= List of paintings and plots by Pascal Coste and Eugène Flandin =

This is a list of paintings and plots by Eugène Flandin and Pascal Coste, French painter and architects in 1840. This collection contains 200 images, 130 paintings from Flandin and 70 maps and plots from Coste which published in two books: Travel in Iran and Modern Monuments of Iran.

== Maku; Khosrova; Tabriz ==
=== Eugène Flandin ===
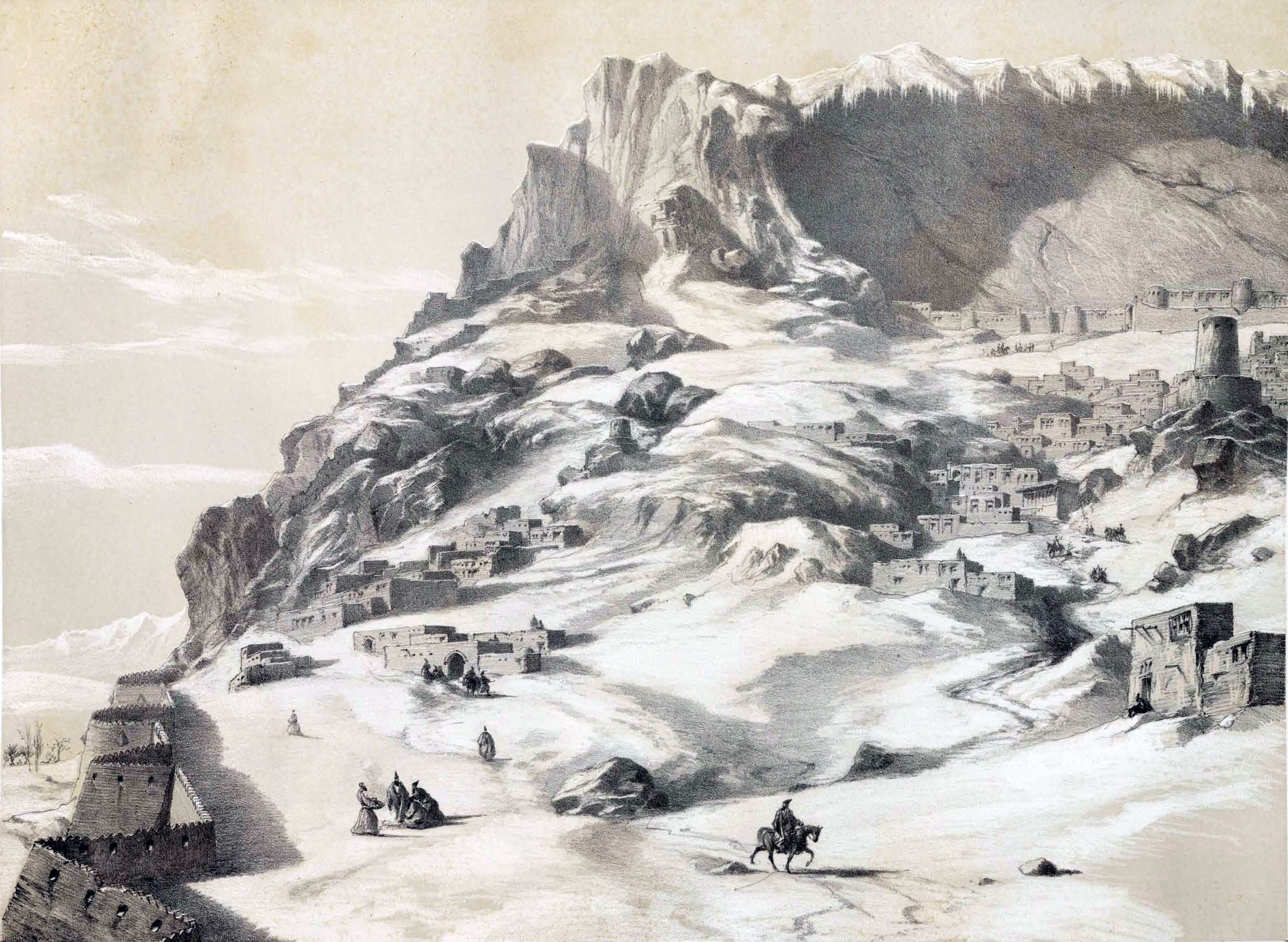
Maku border city of Armenia

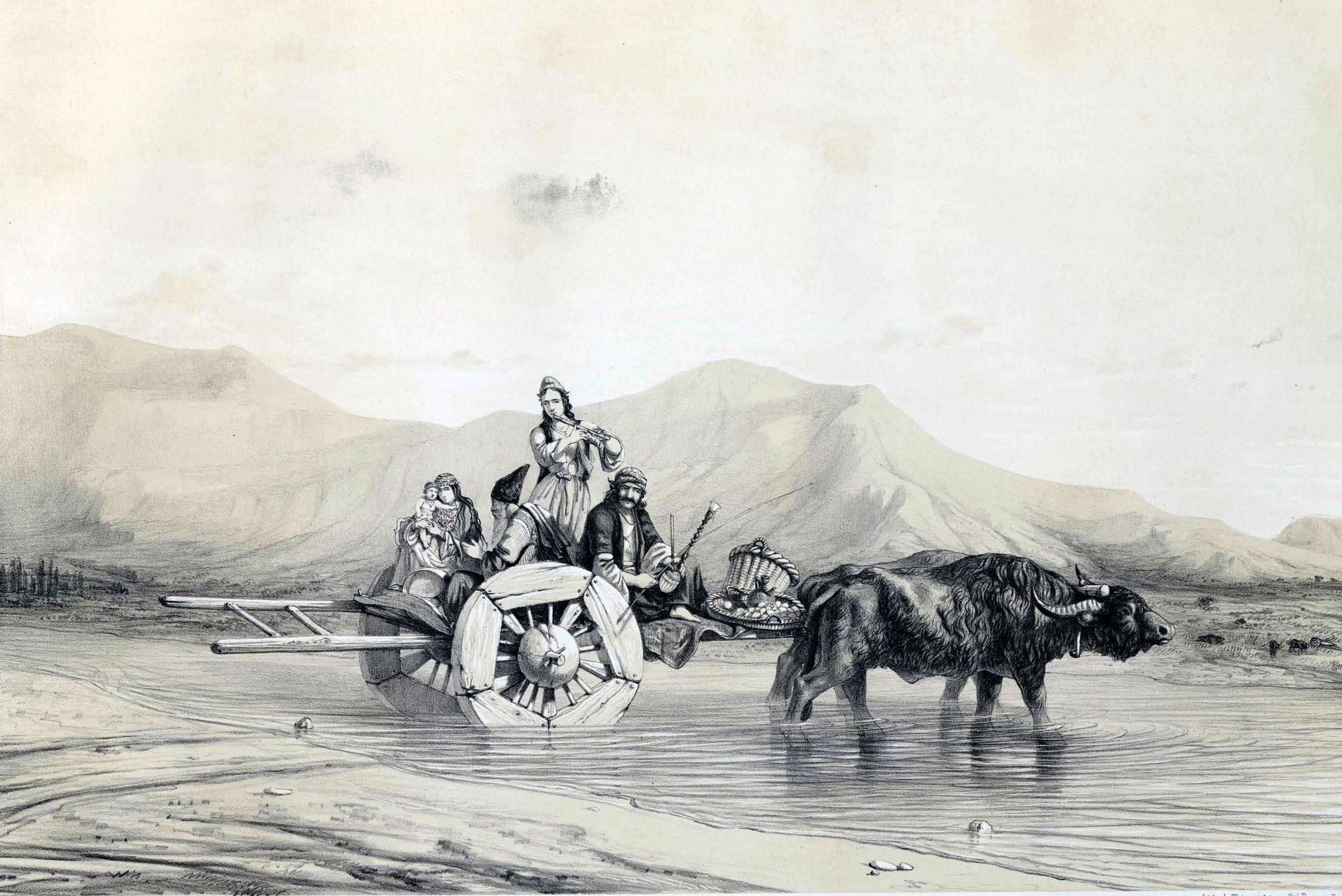
Laborers of Khosrova Azerbaijan

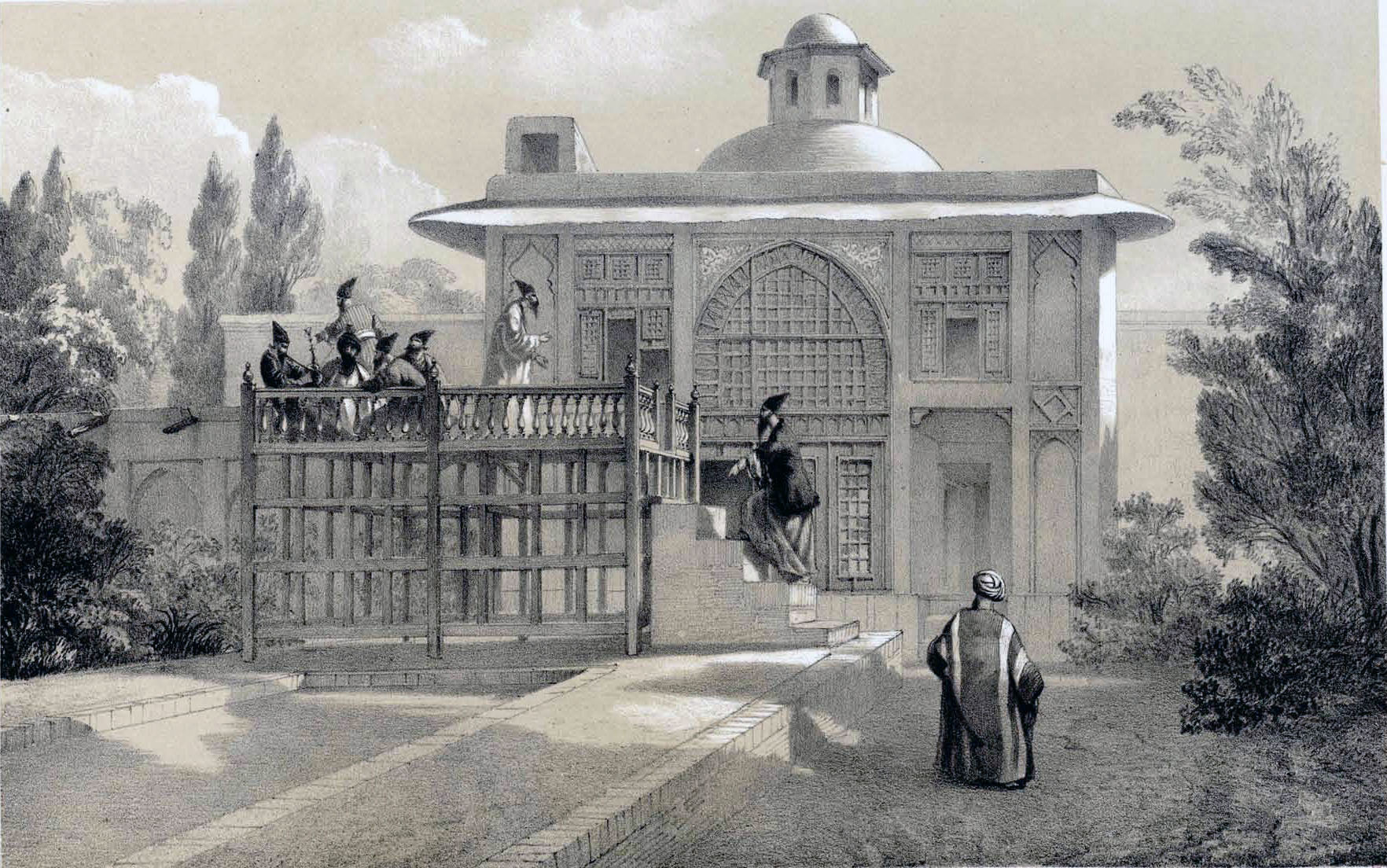
Housing a Khan

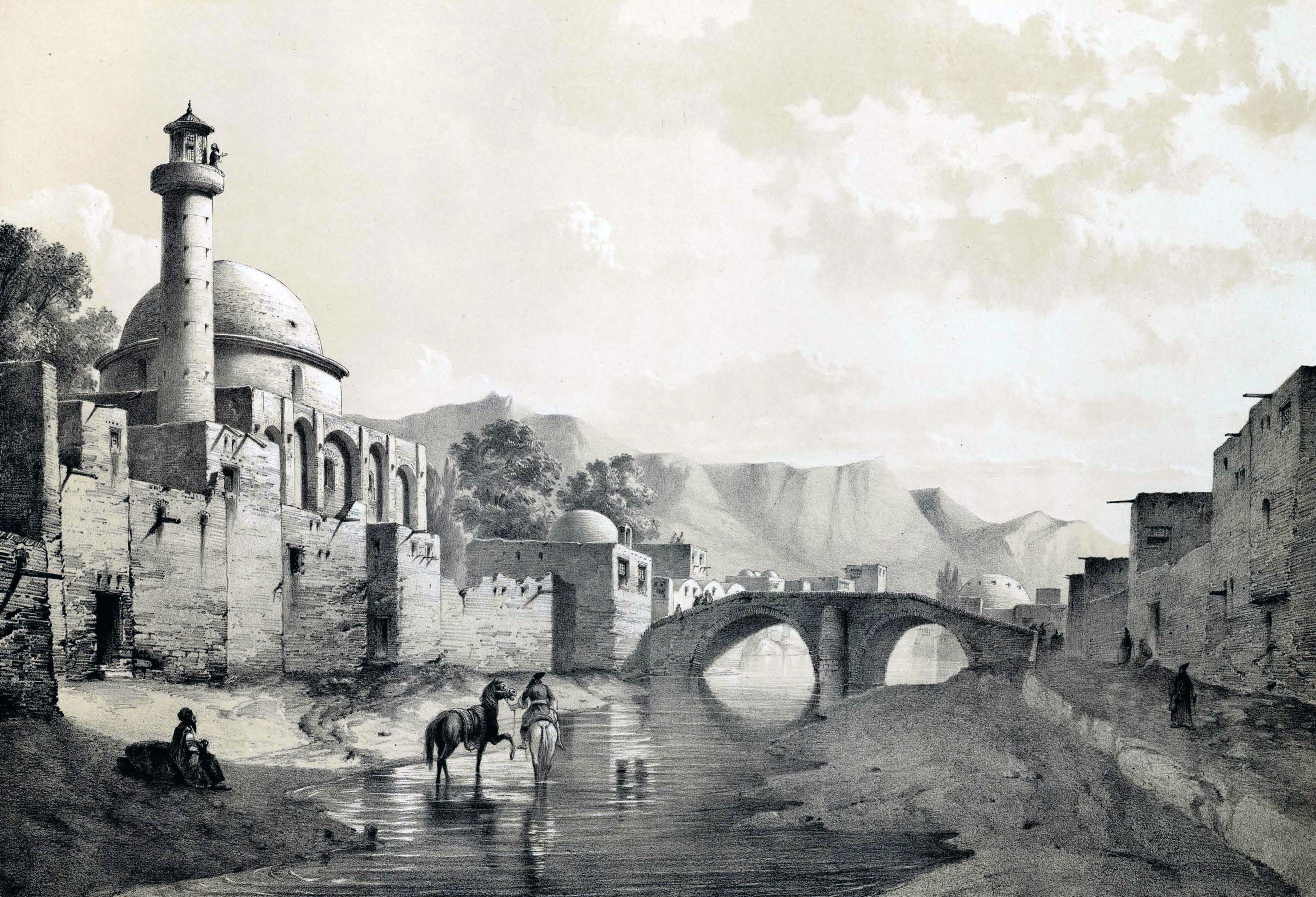
Tabriz (Saheb-ol-Amr Mosque)

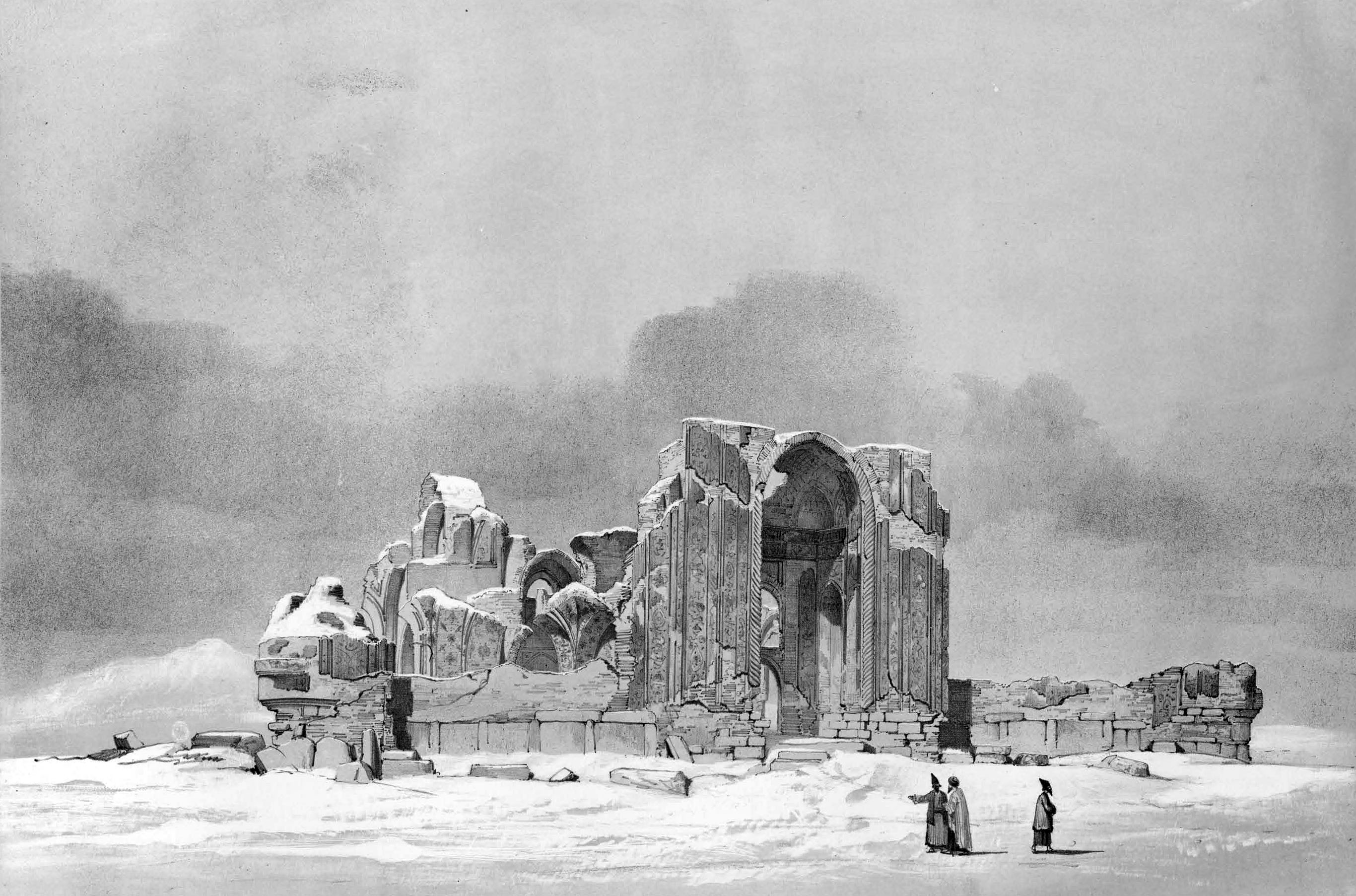
Ruined Mosque, Tabriz (Blue Mosque)

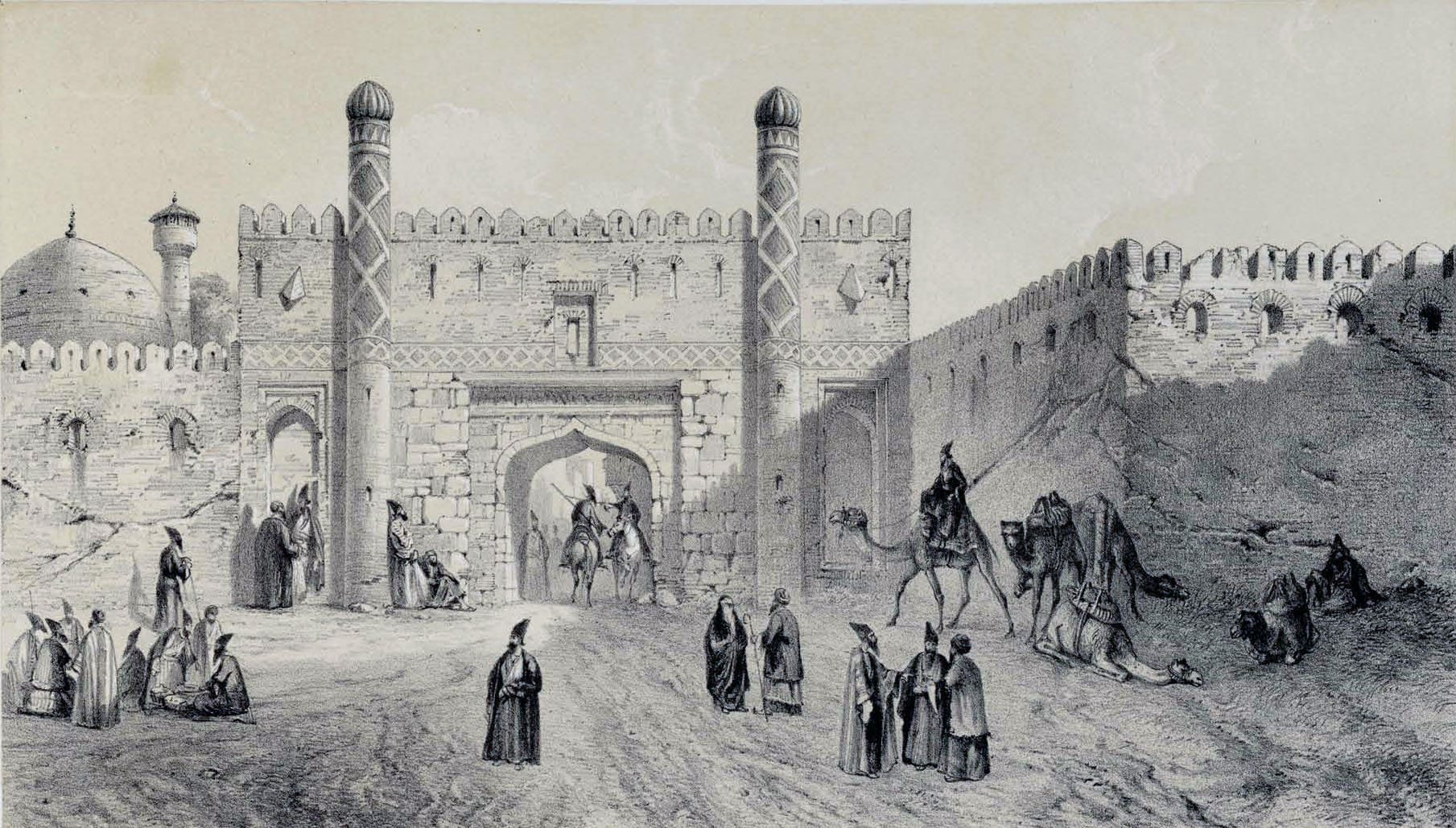
City Gate, Tabriz

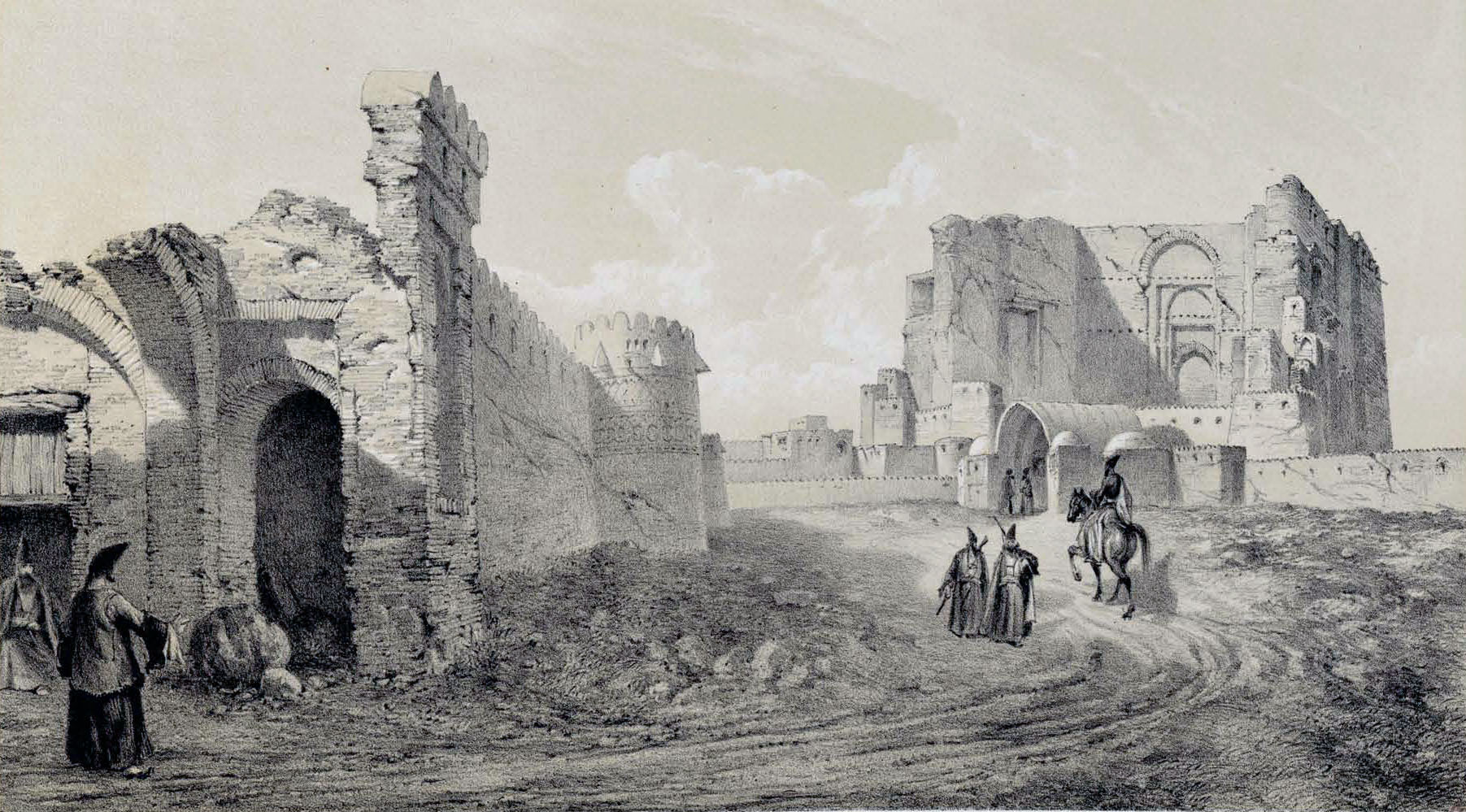
Remains of the Palace Zobeideh, Tabriz (Arg of Tabriz)

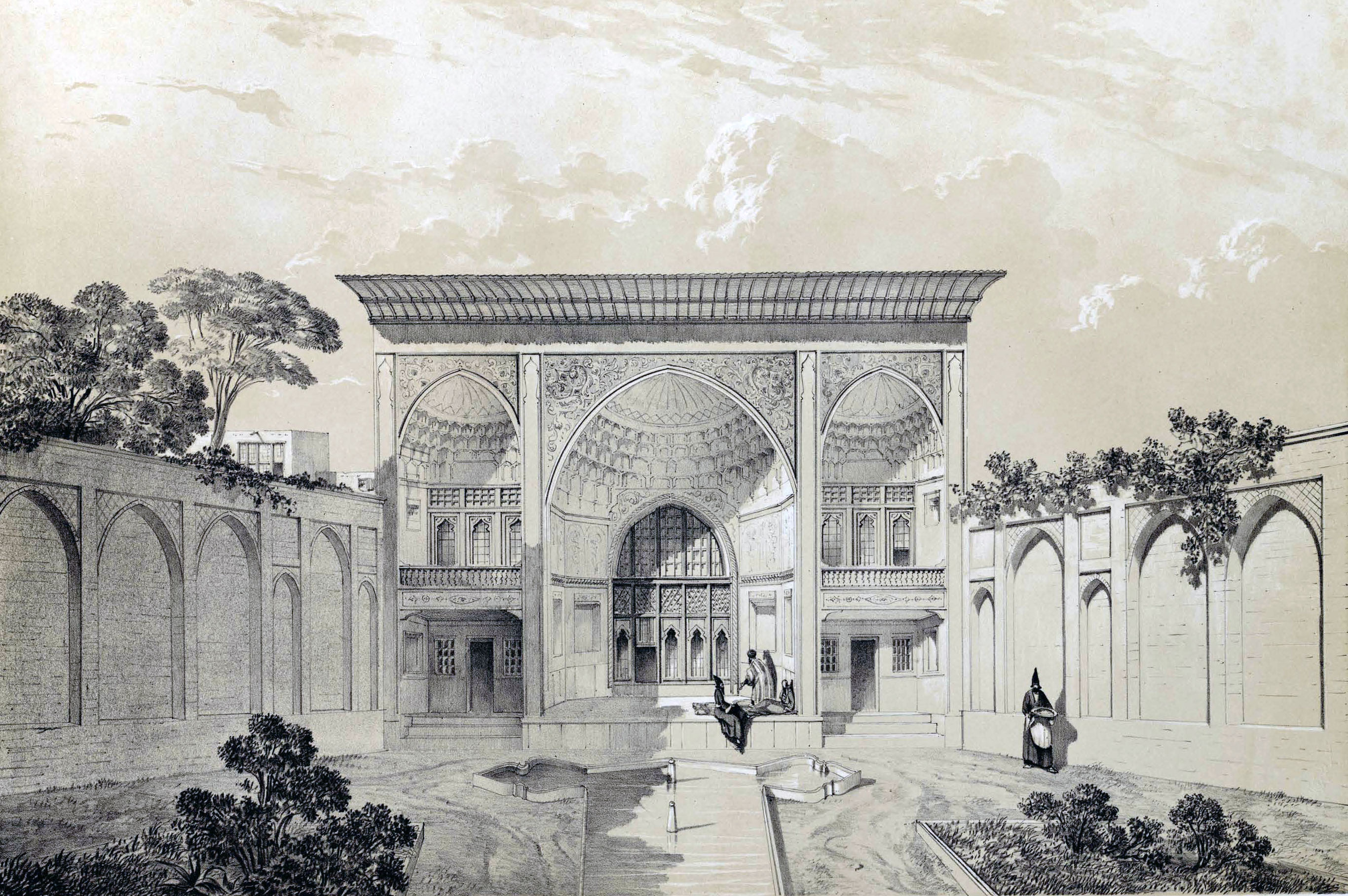
House Hussein Khan, Tabriz

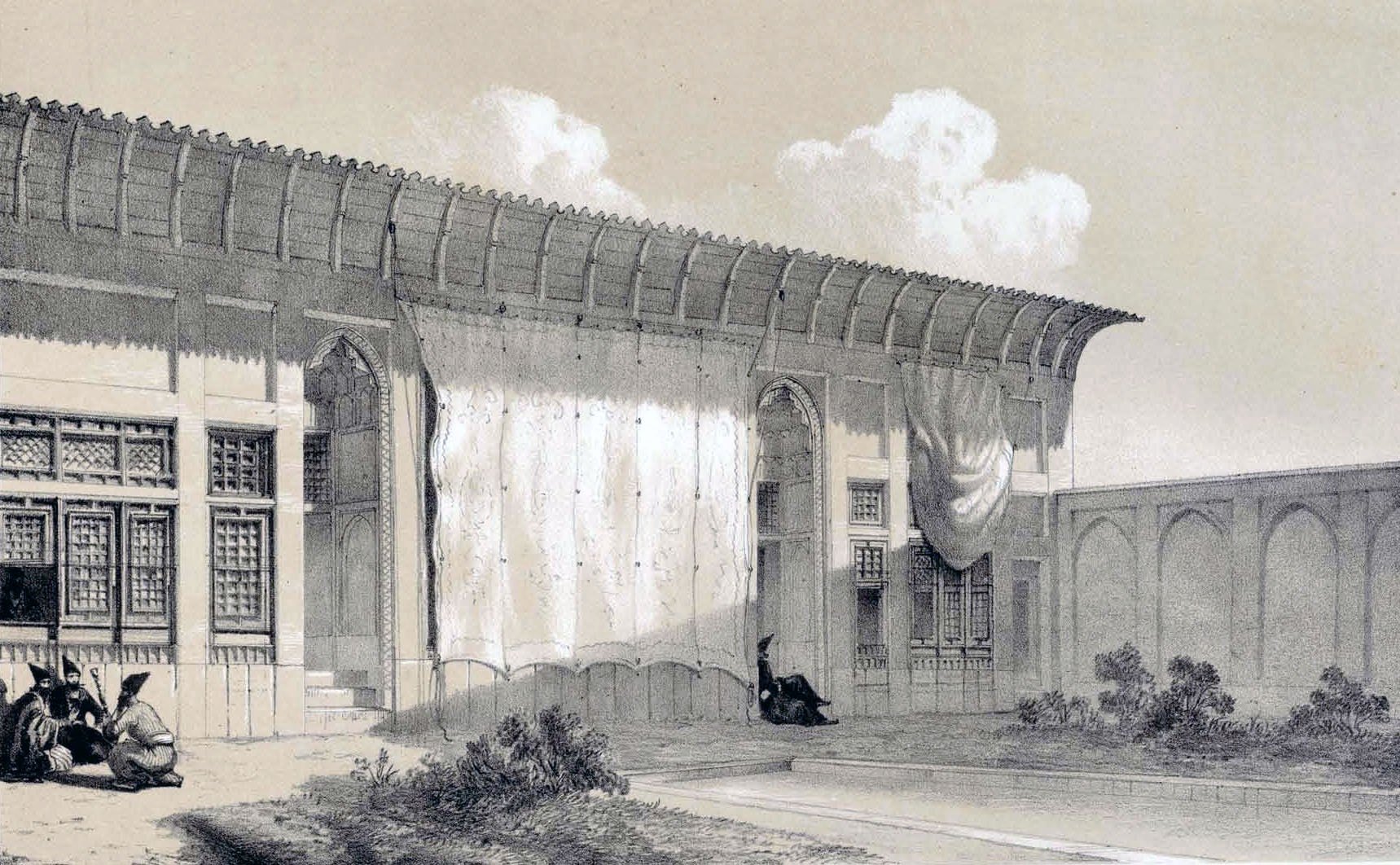
House of Mirza (East-Azerbaijan State Palace)

=== Pascal Coste ===
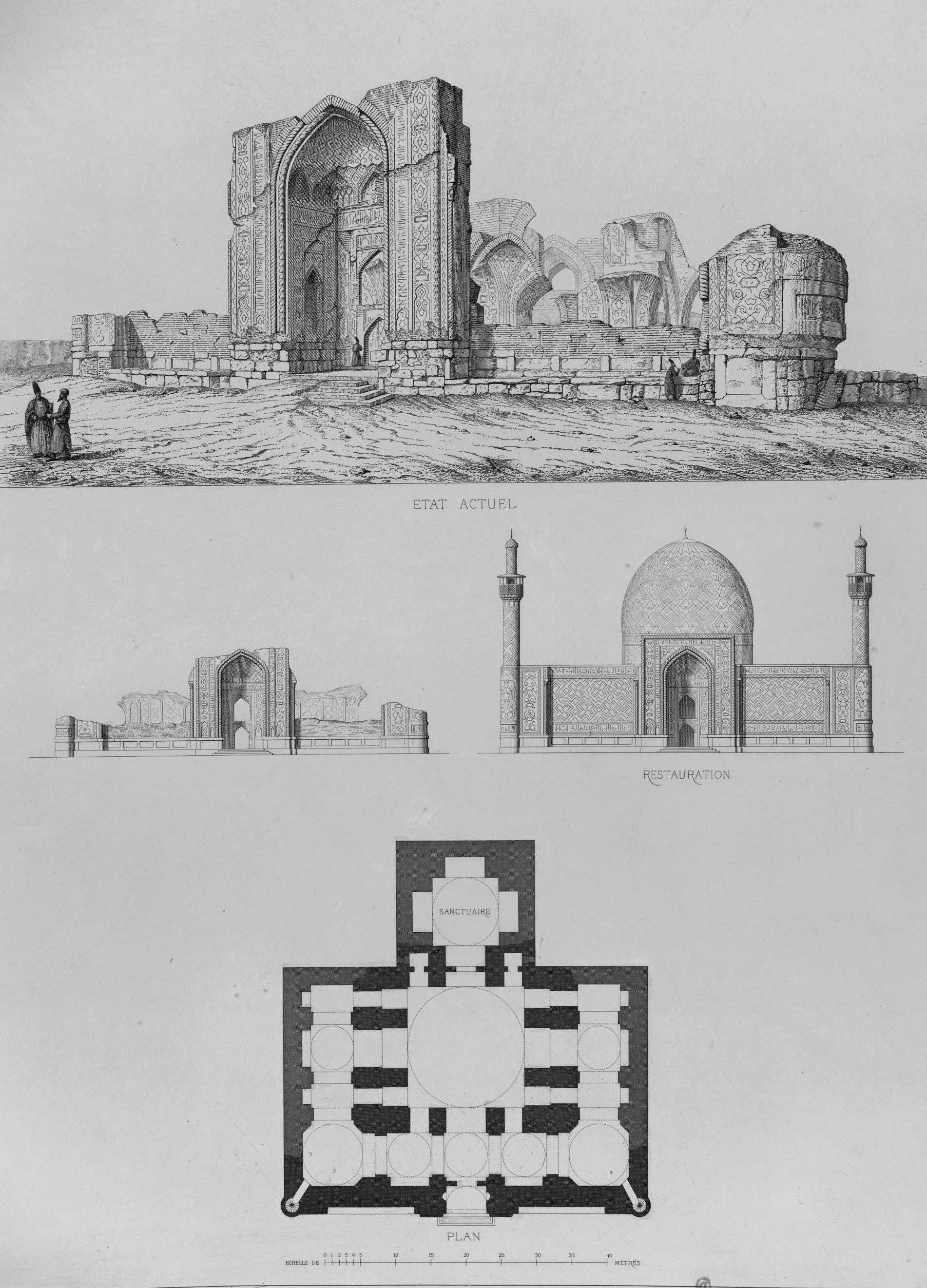
Sunni mosque, Tabriz (Blue Mosque)

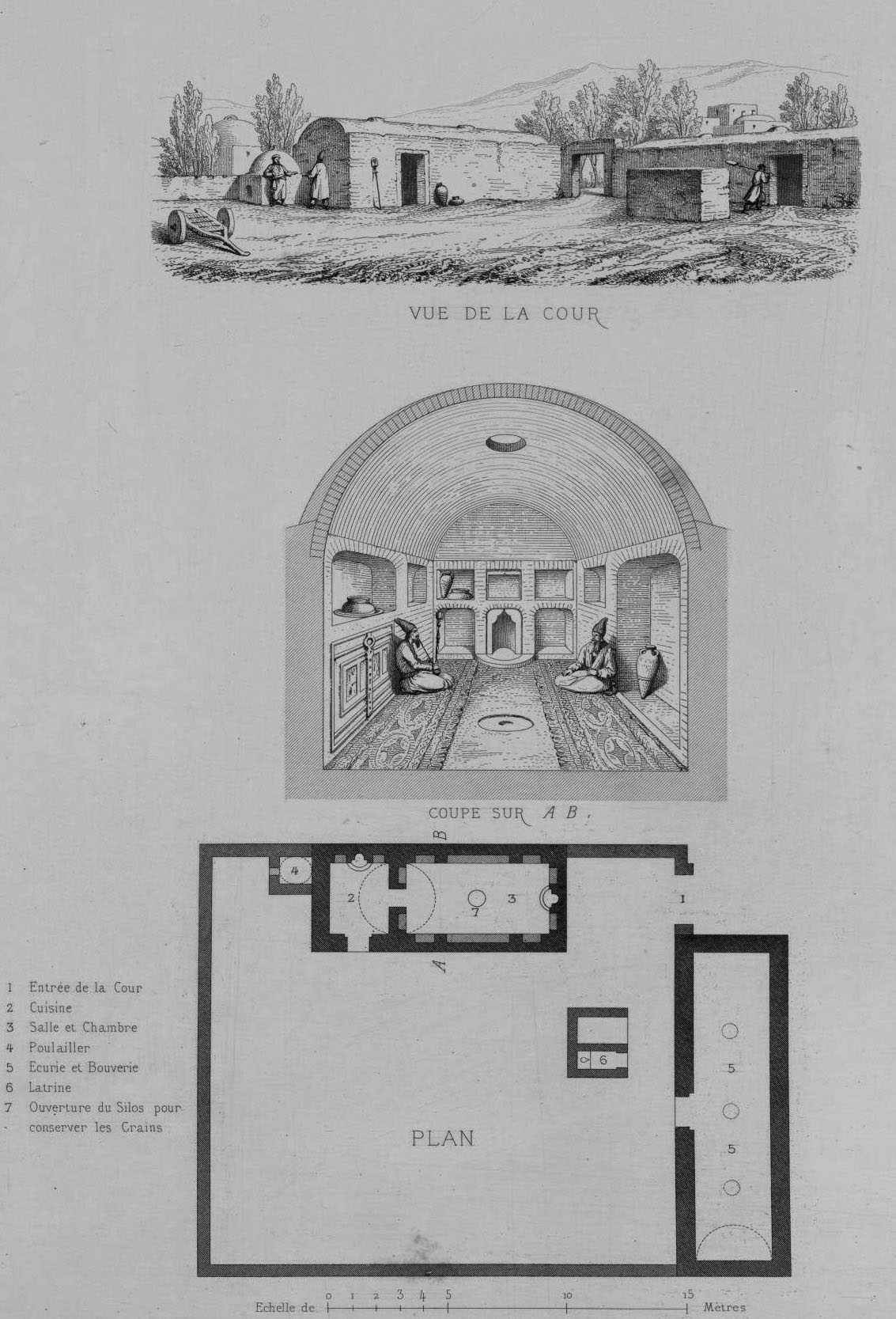
House in the village of Alvar

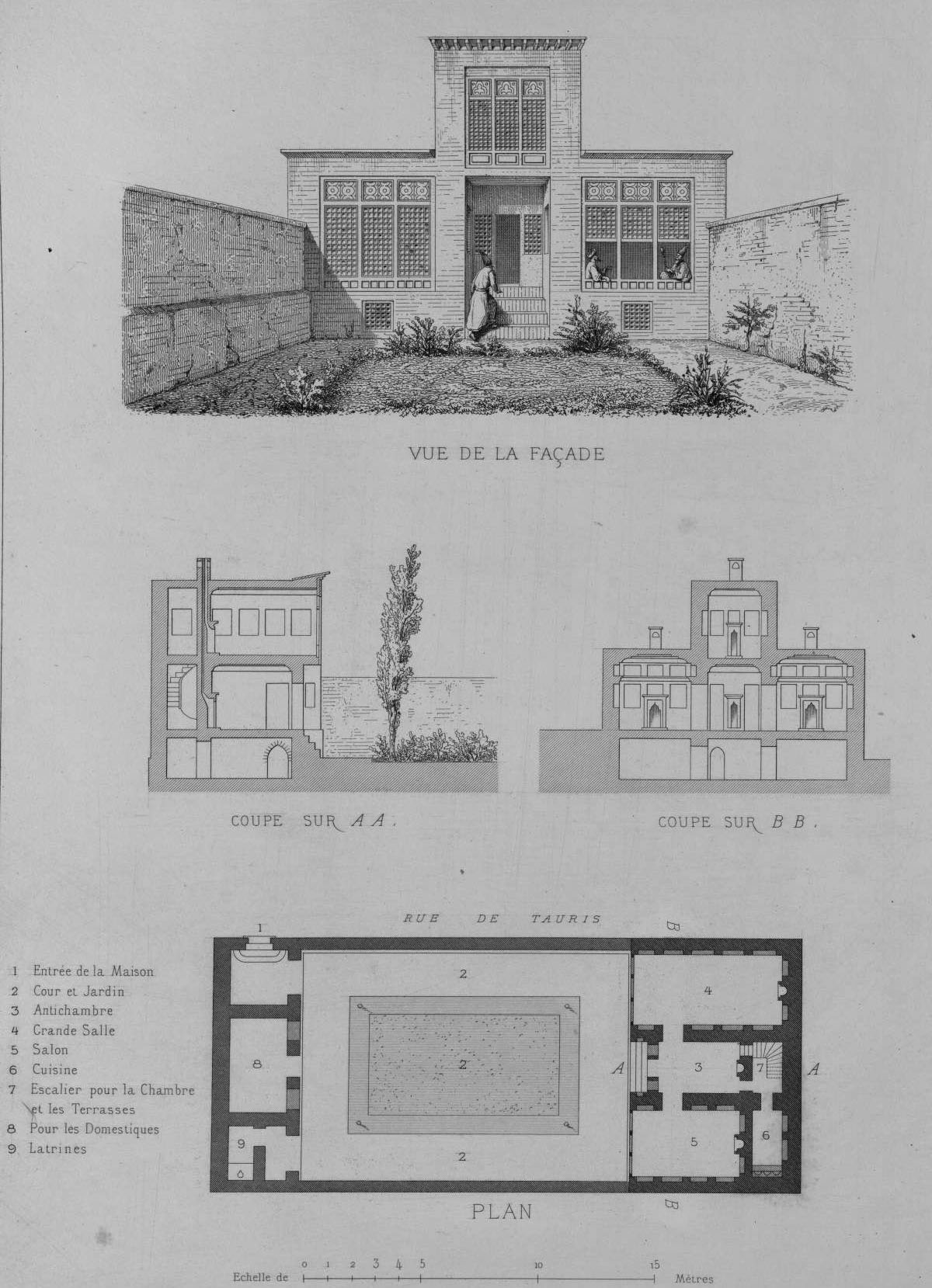
House in Tabriz

== Zanjan; Abhar; Soltaniyeh ==
=== Eugène Flandin ===
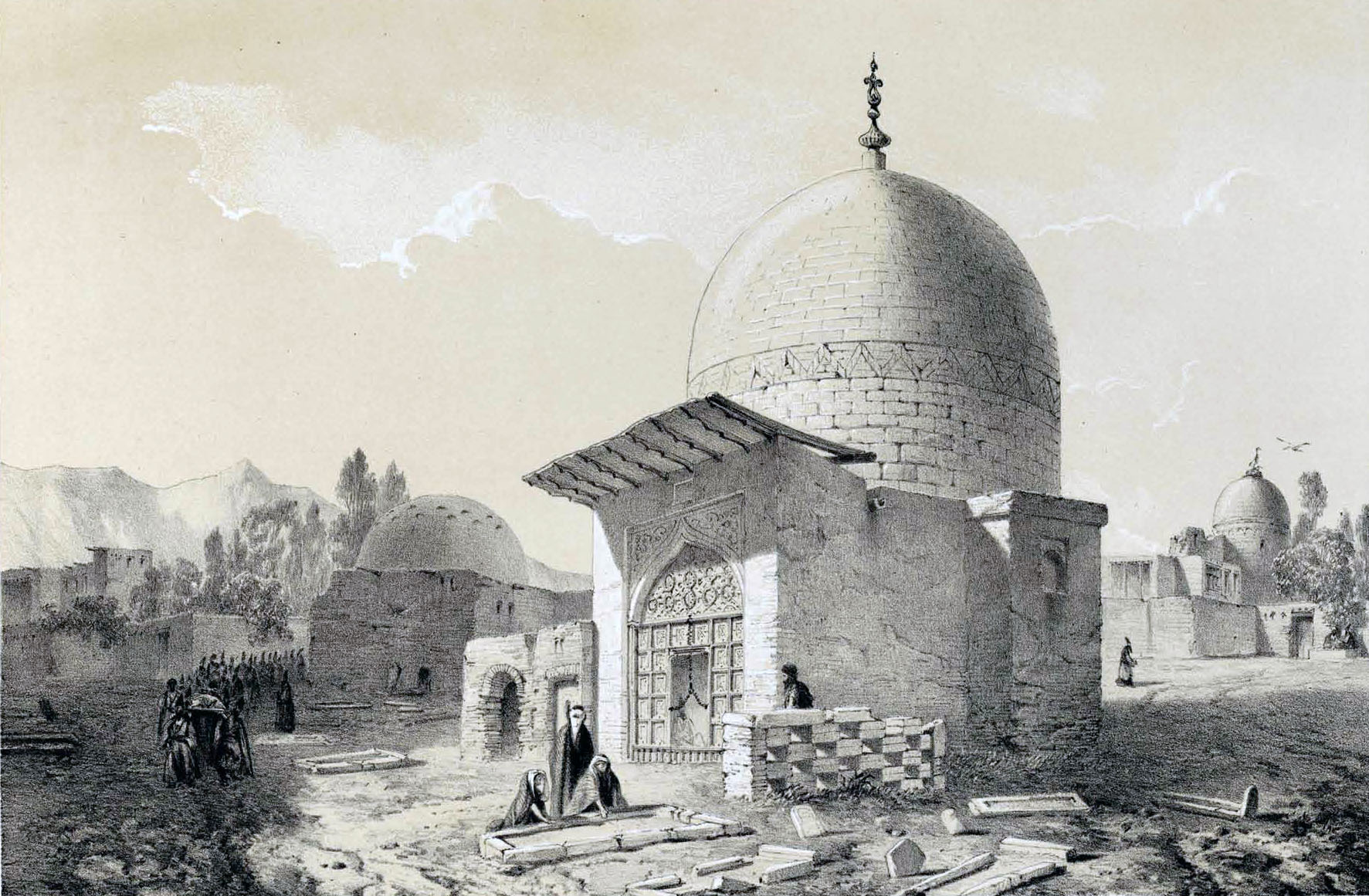
Imam Zadeh and cemetery (Gheidar Nabi), Zanjan

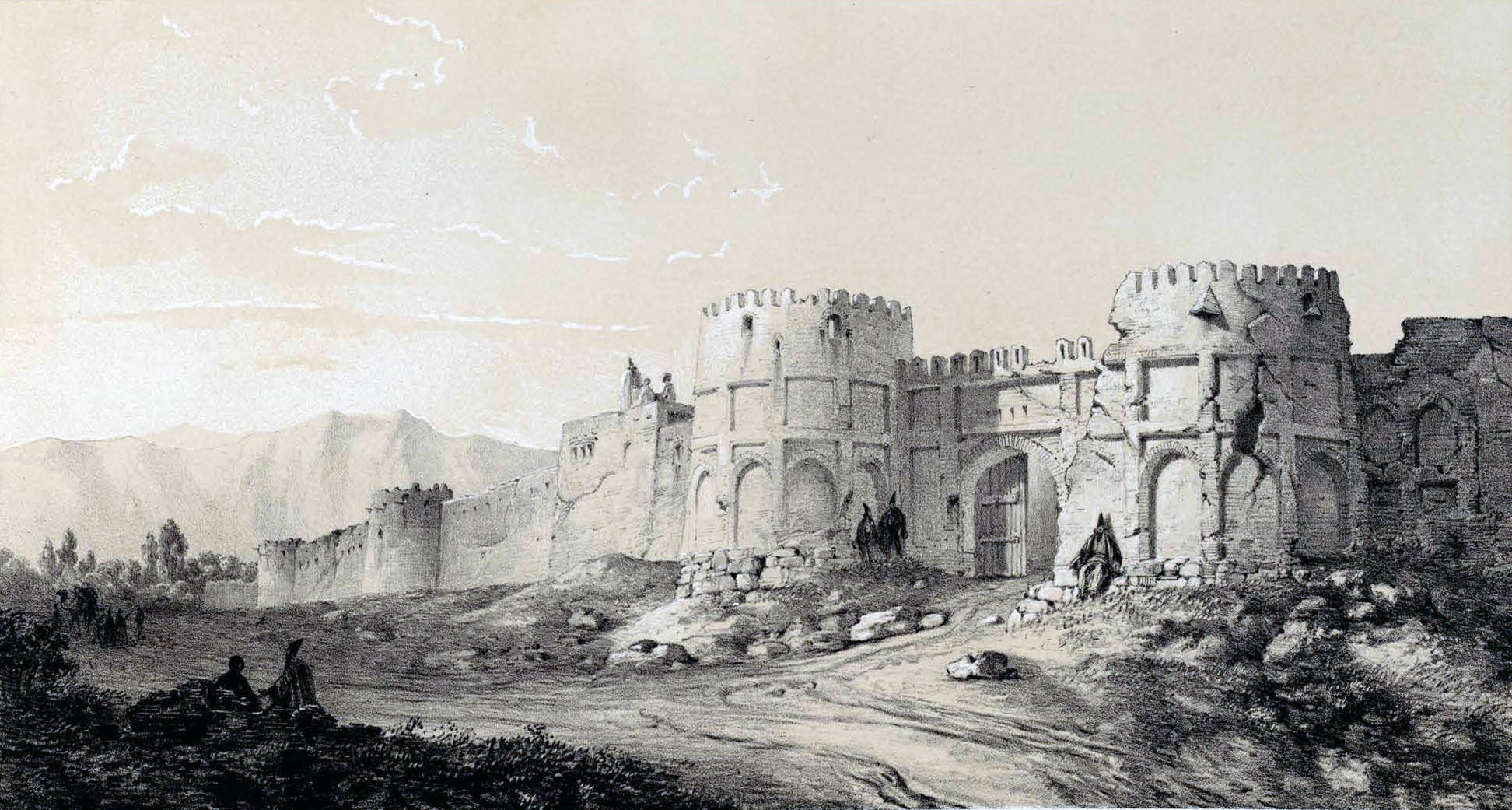
Walled enclosure Zanjan

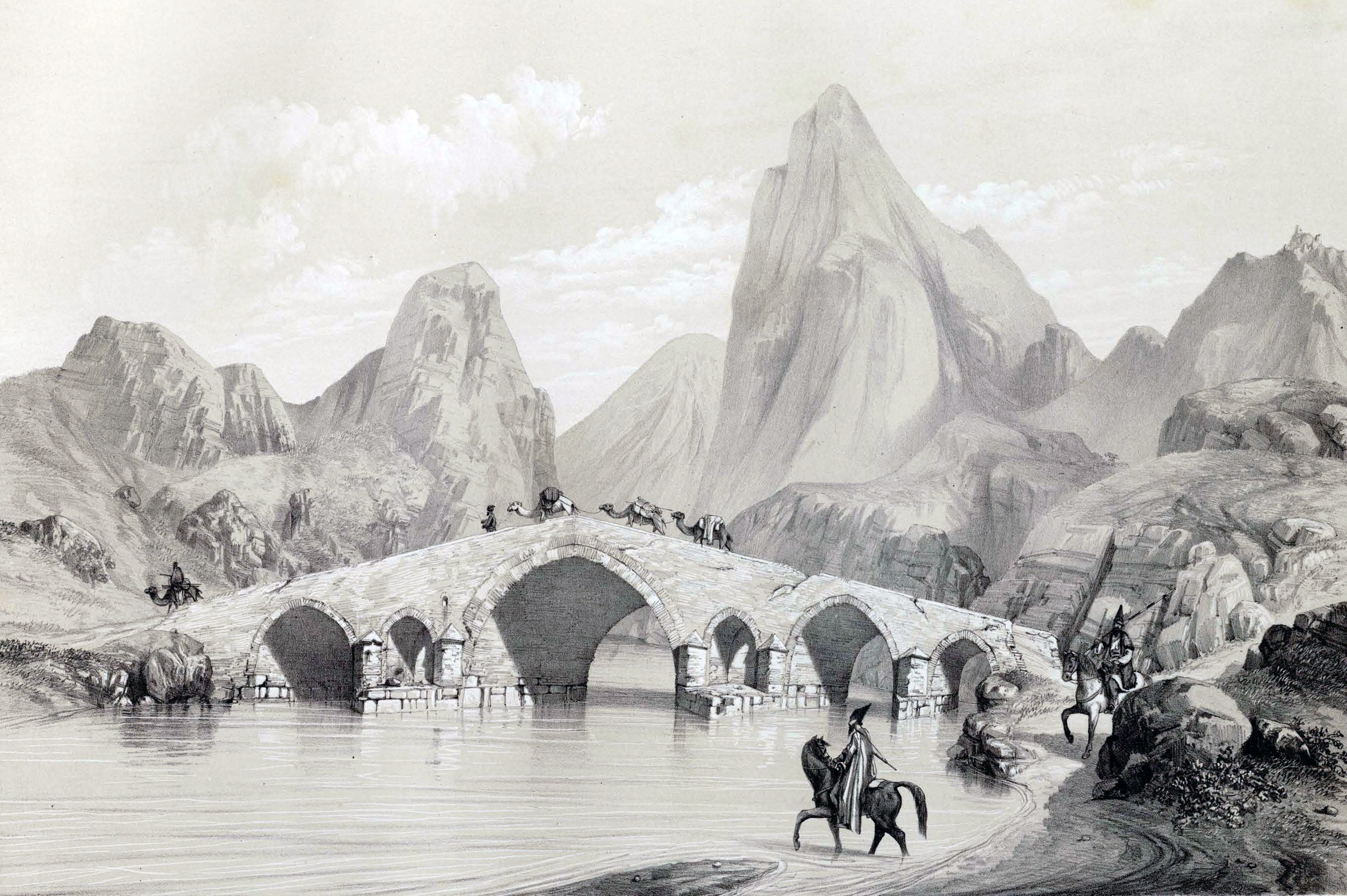
Qezel Uzan (Dokhtar) Bridge

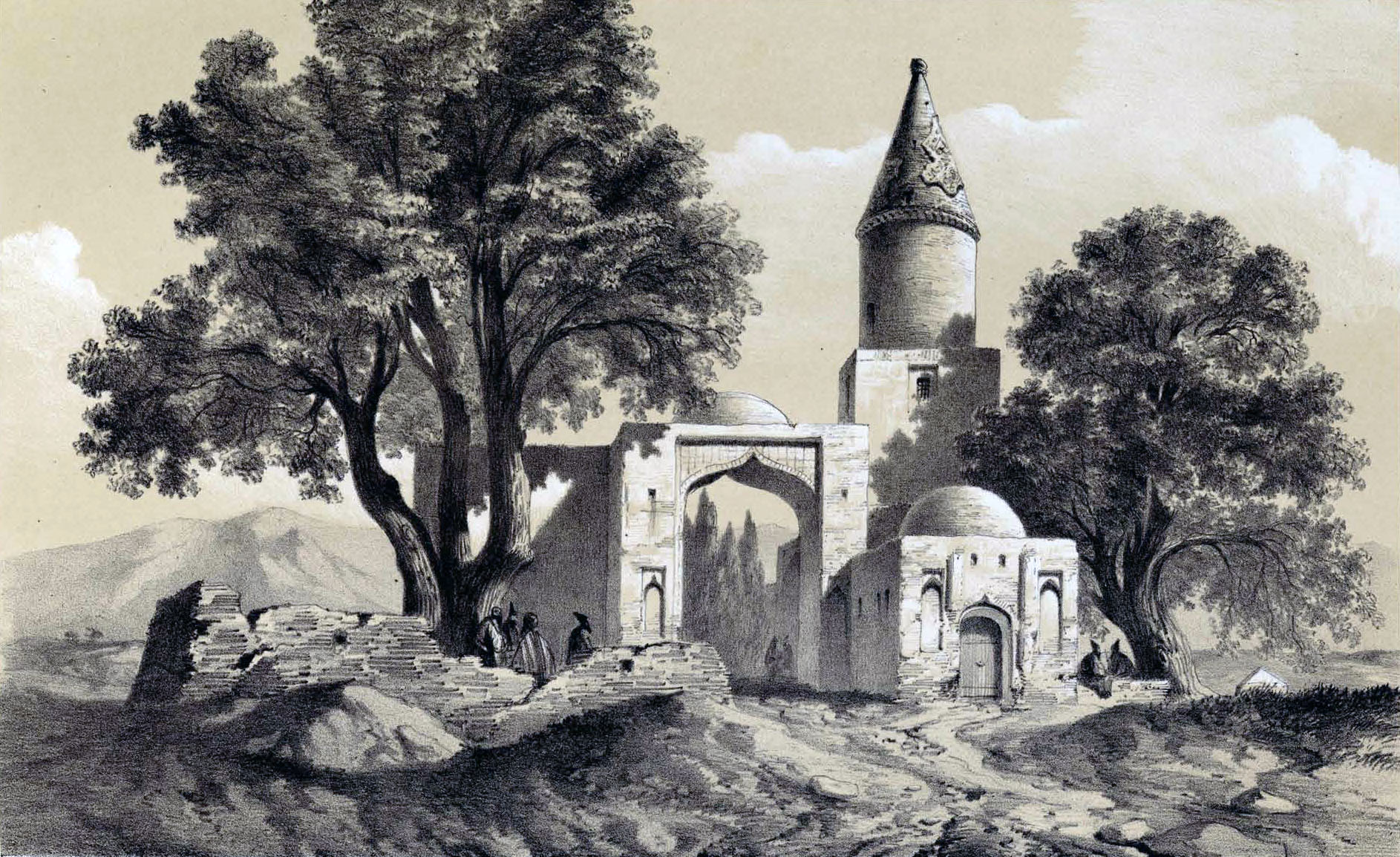
Tomb of Imam Zadeh, Abhar

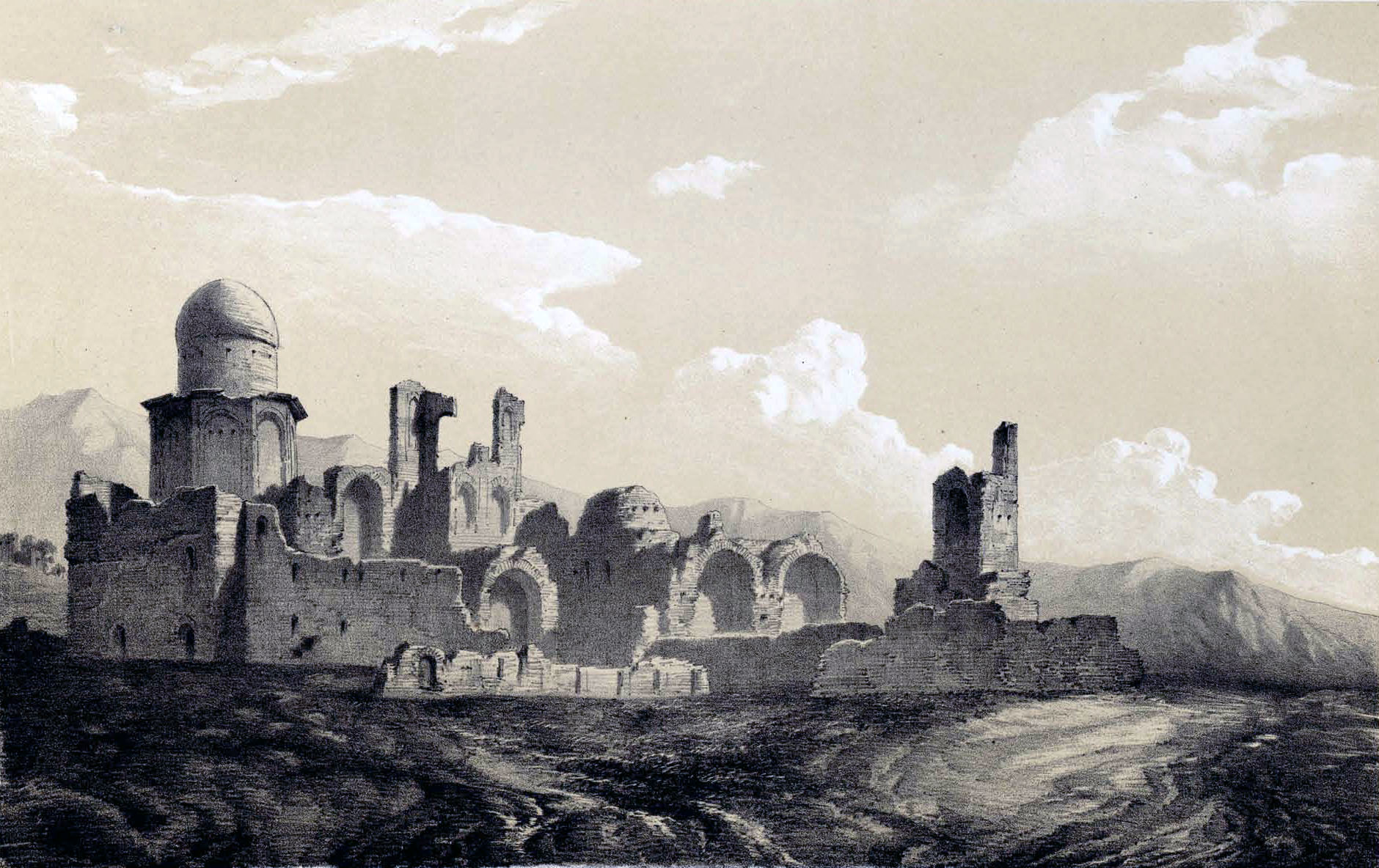
Ruins of a palace in Soltaniyeh

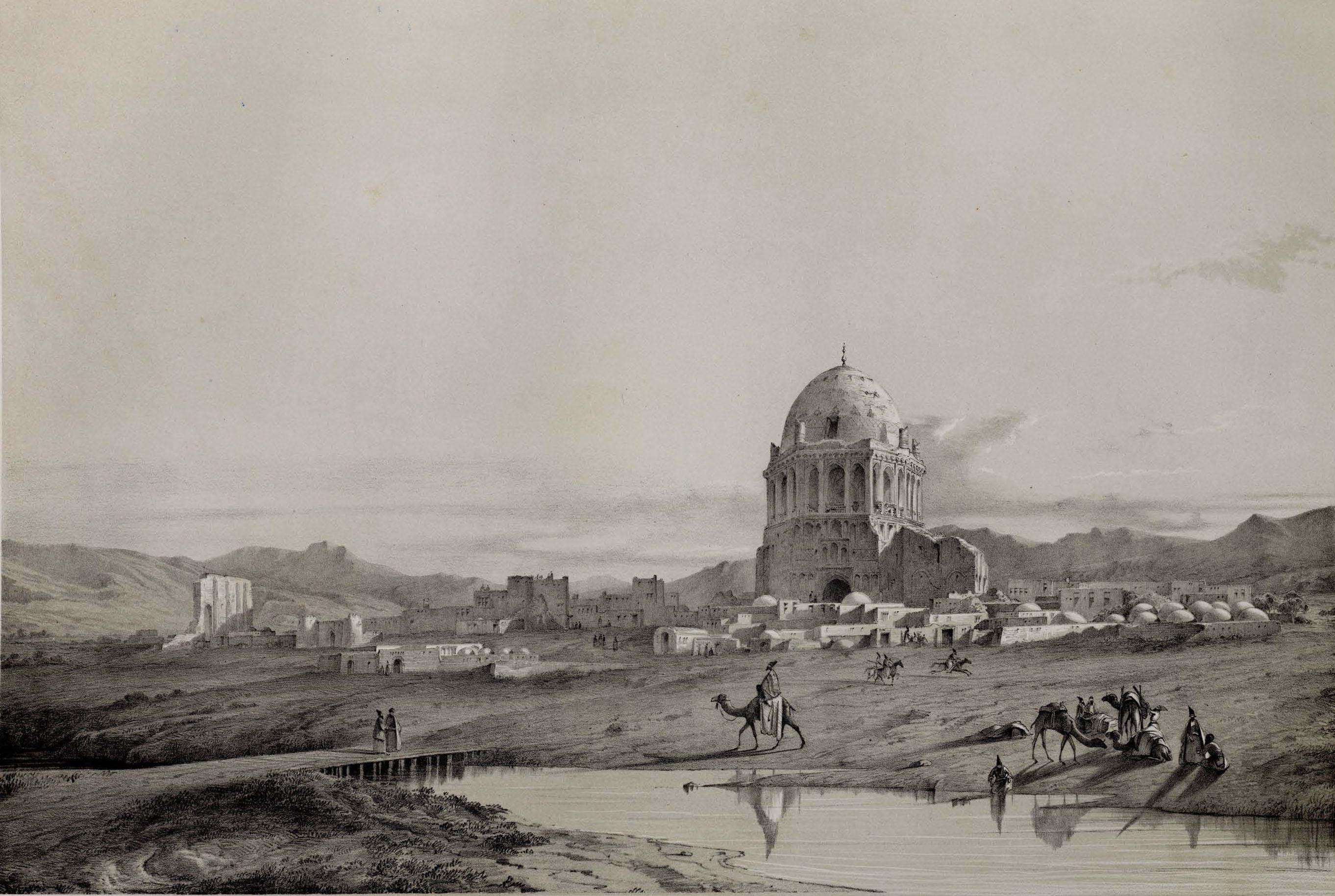
Village Soltaniyeh, Iraq - Adjemi

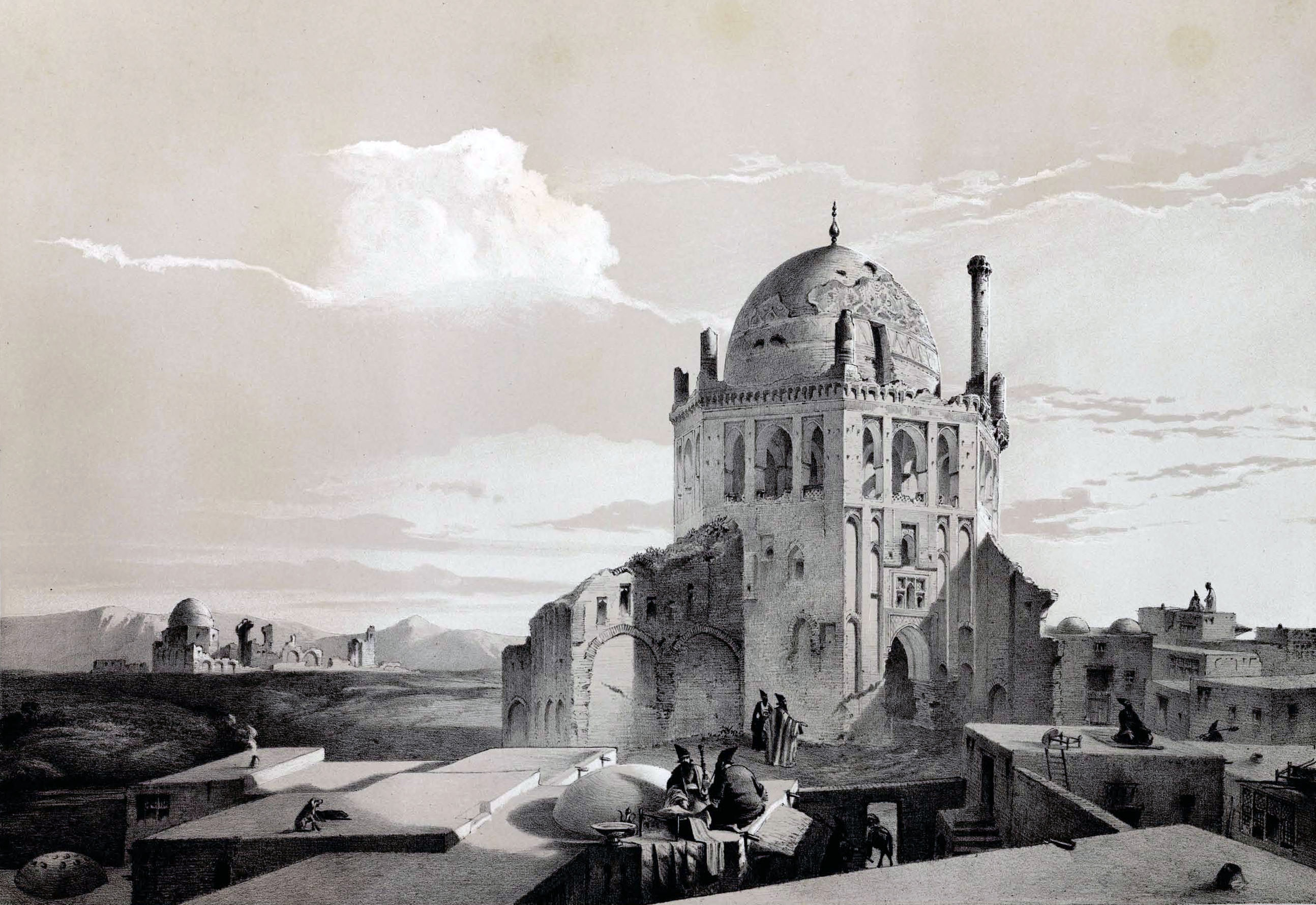
Shah Khoda Bendeh mosque in Soltaniyeh

=== Pascal Coste ===
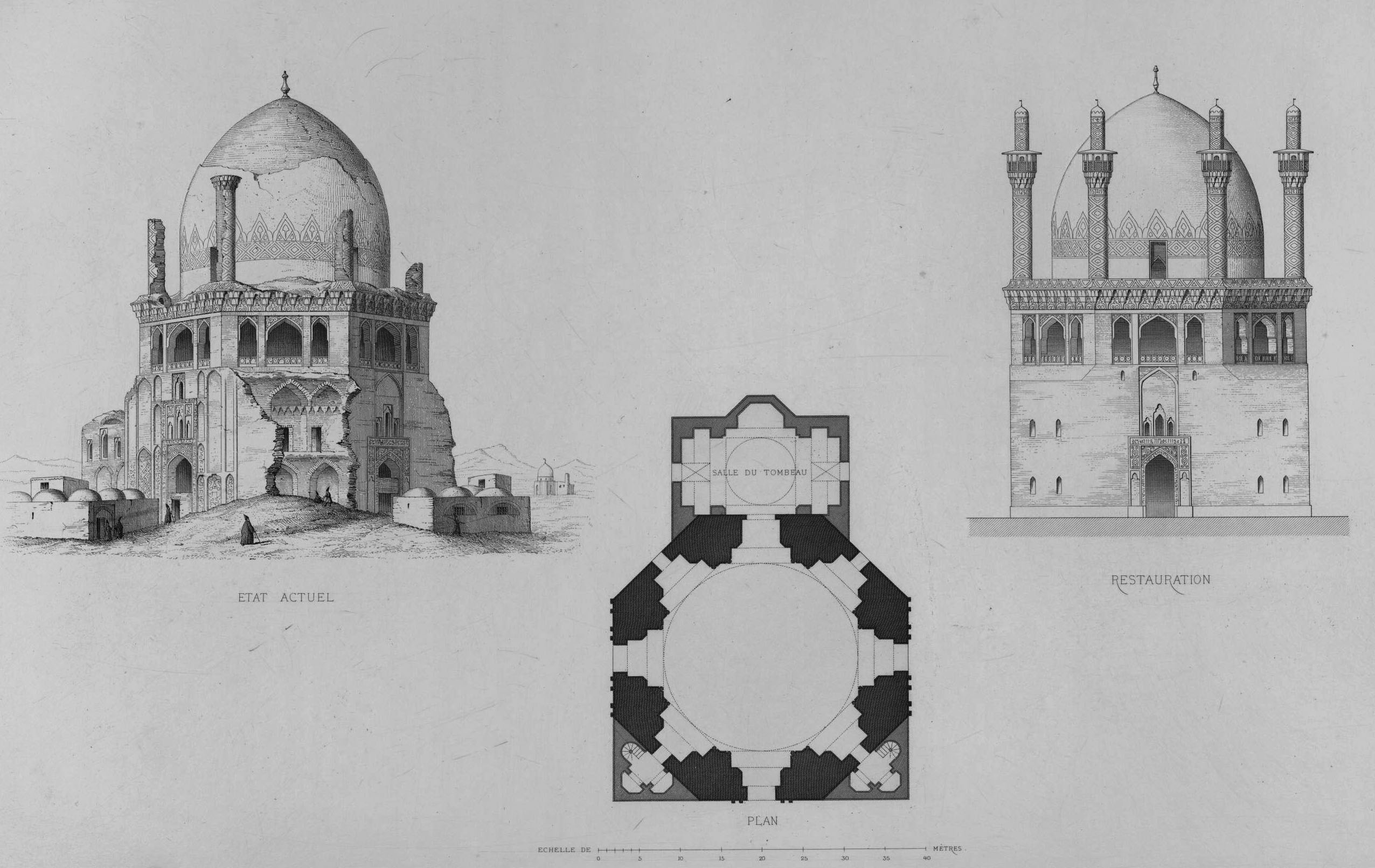
Mosque and tomb of Ismael Khodabendeh, Soltaniyeh

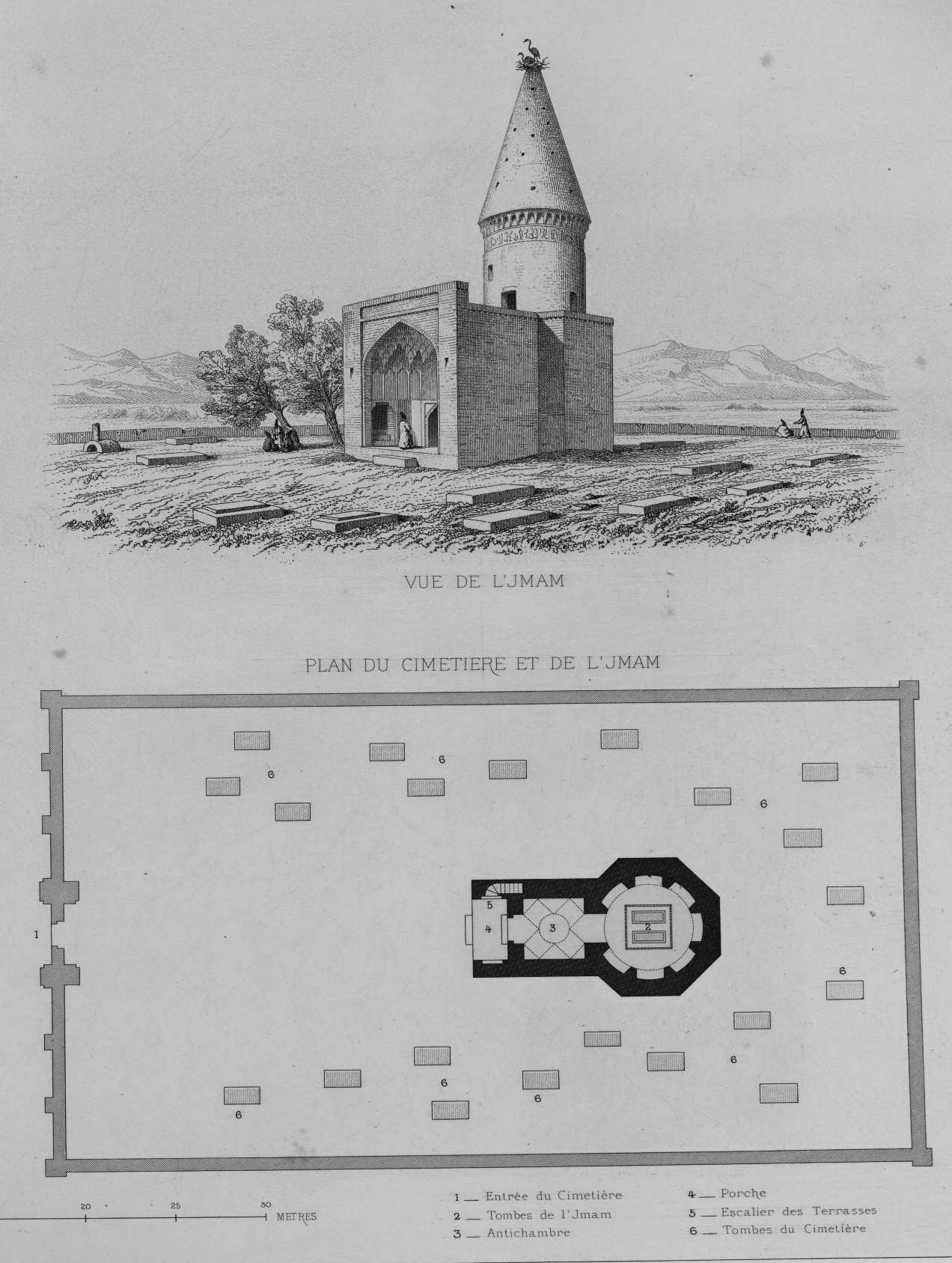
Jmam and cemetery Farseidjeh

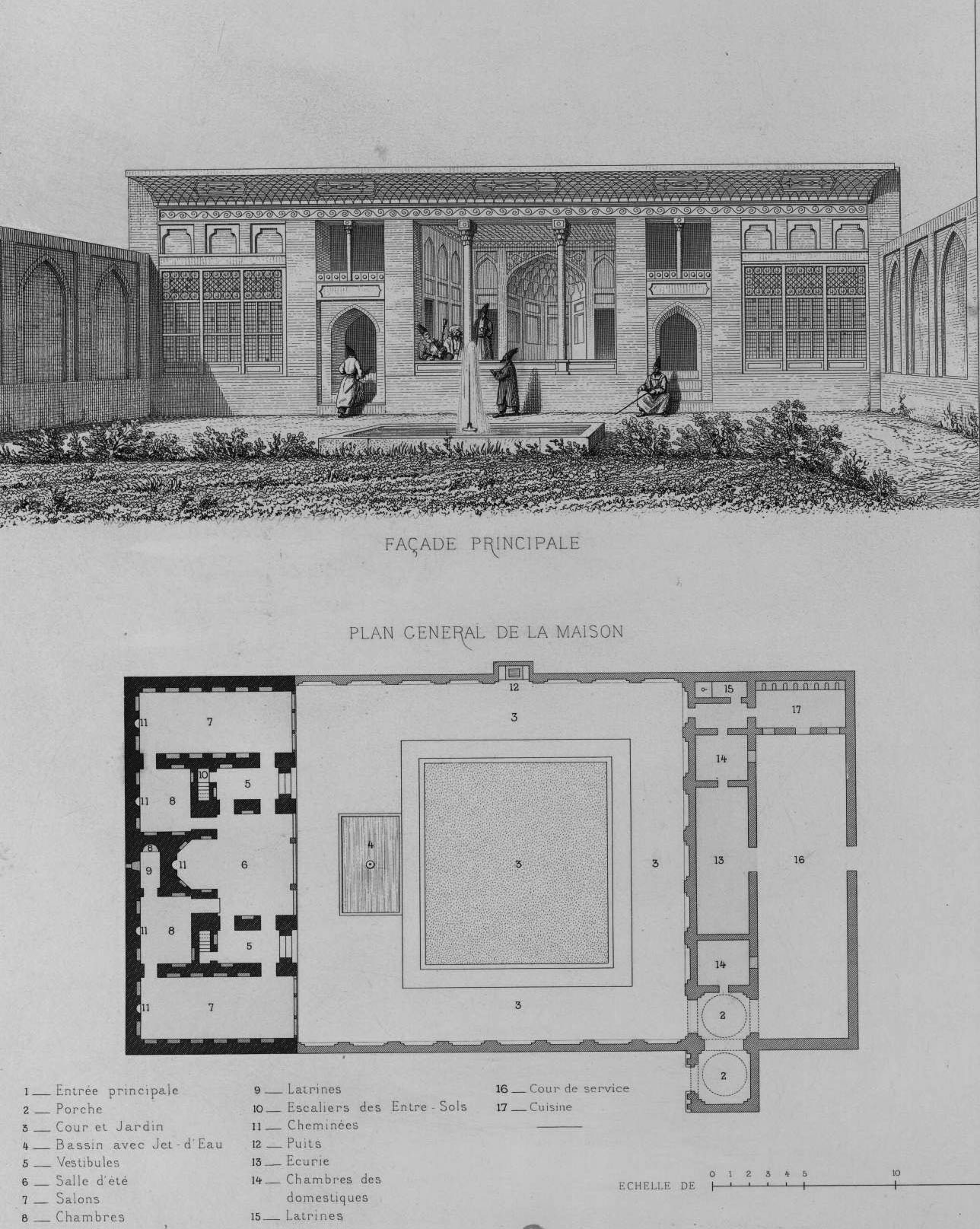
Great house, Abhar

== Qazvin; Siadeh (Takestan) ==
=== Eugène Flandin ===
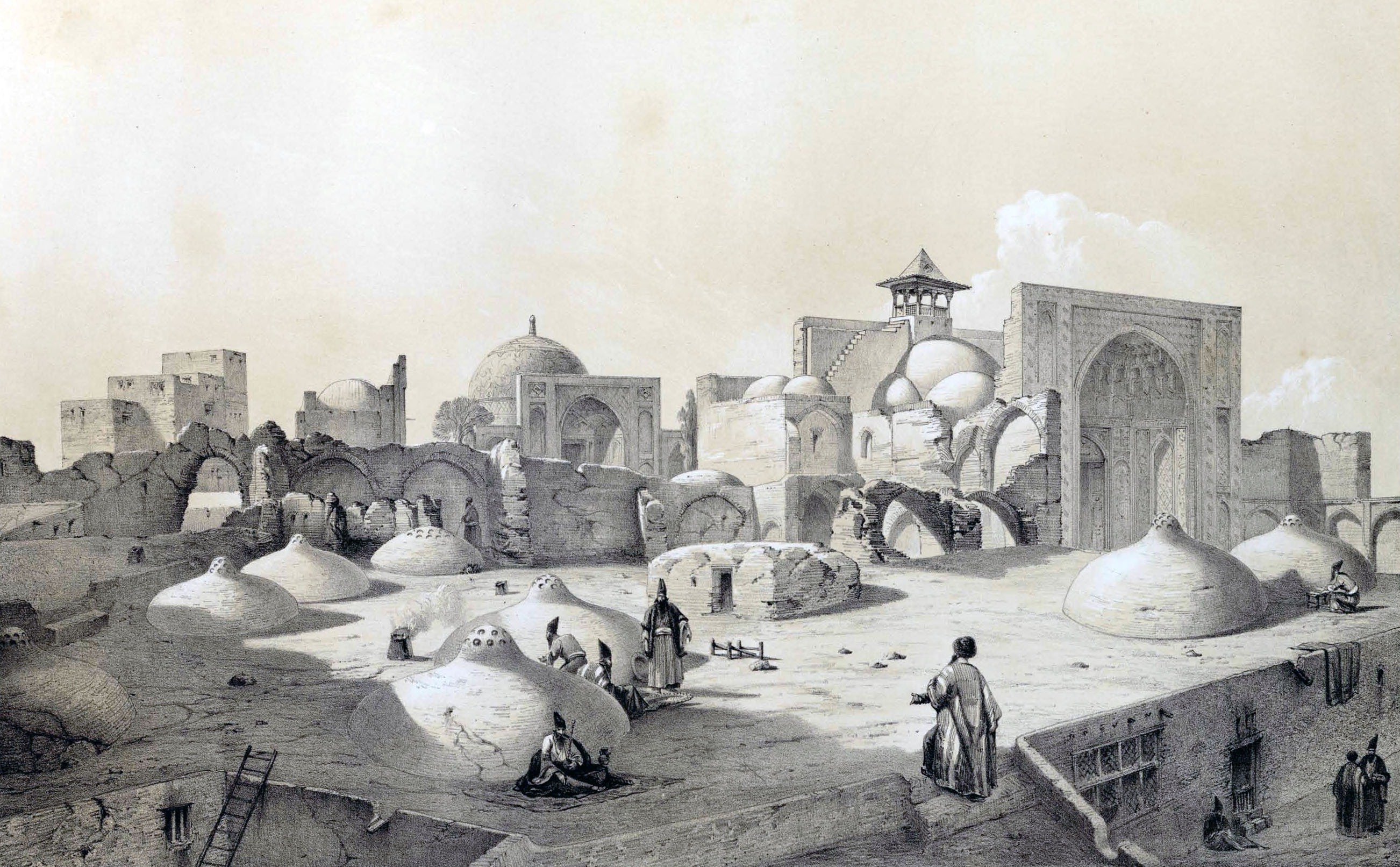
Royal Mosque and terraces of houses, Qazvin

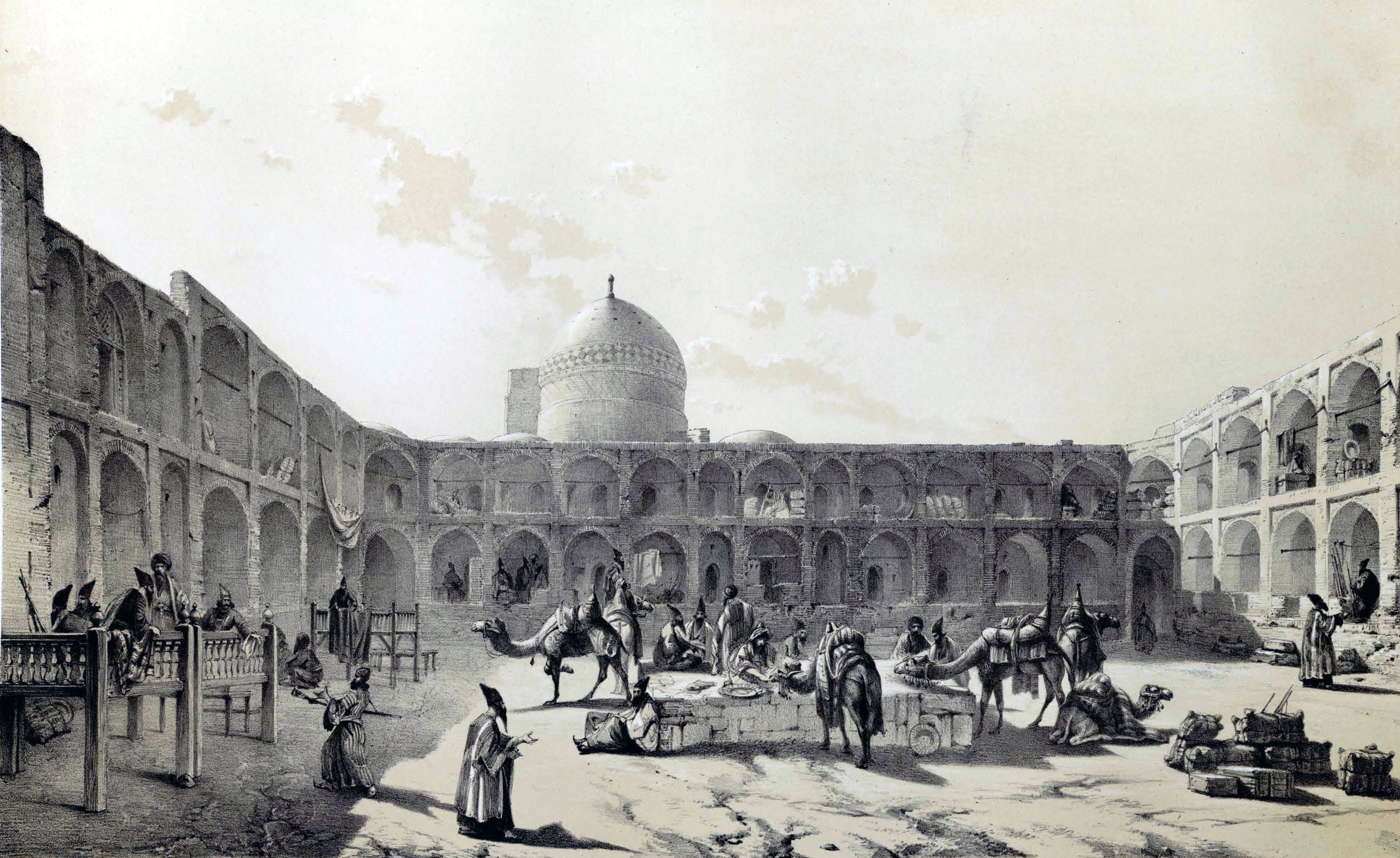
Caravanserai-i-Shah, Qazvin

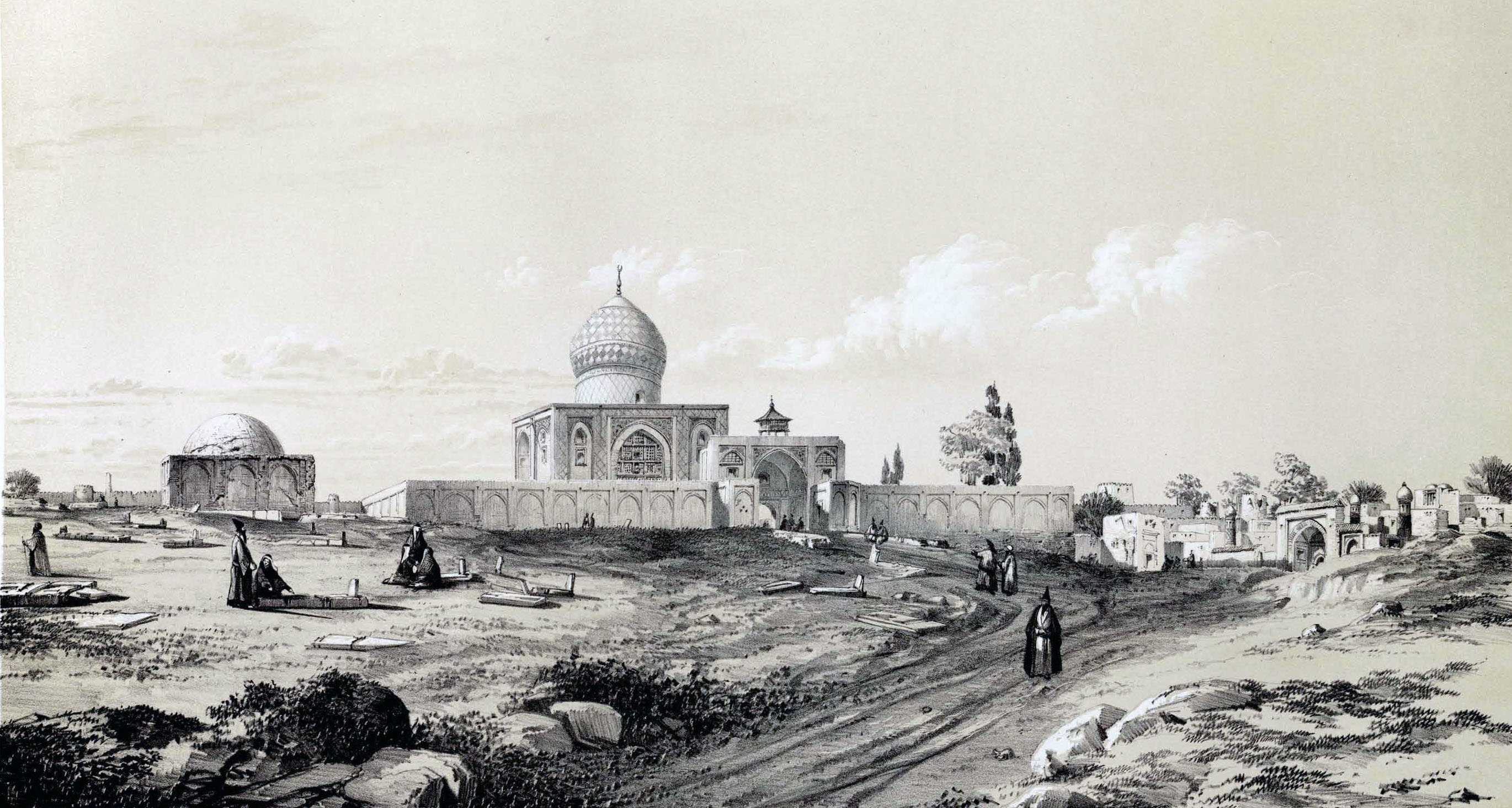
Imam Hussein Zadeh, Qazvin

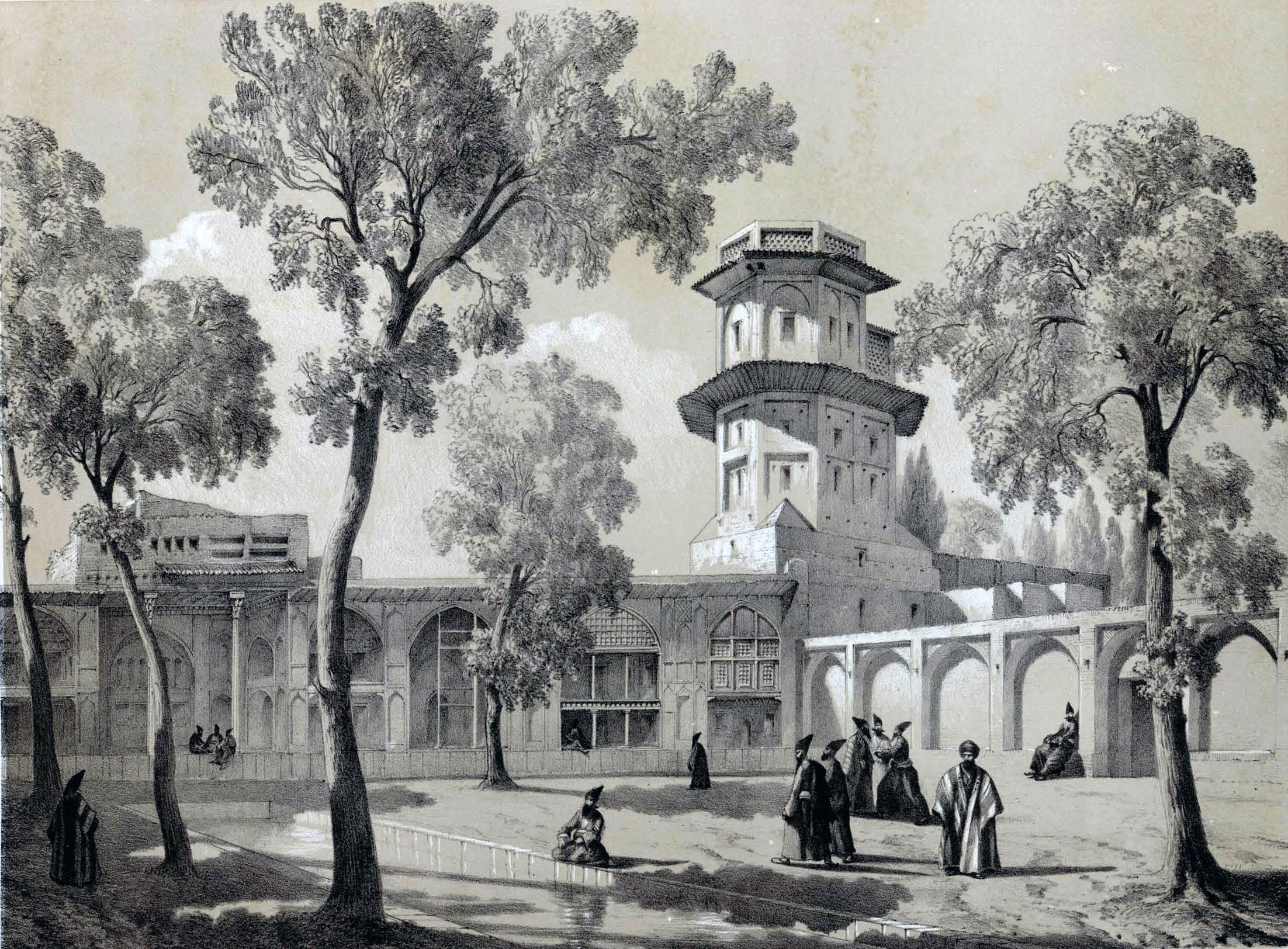
Courtyard of the seraglio, Qazvin

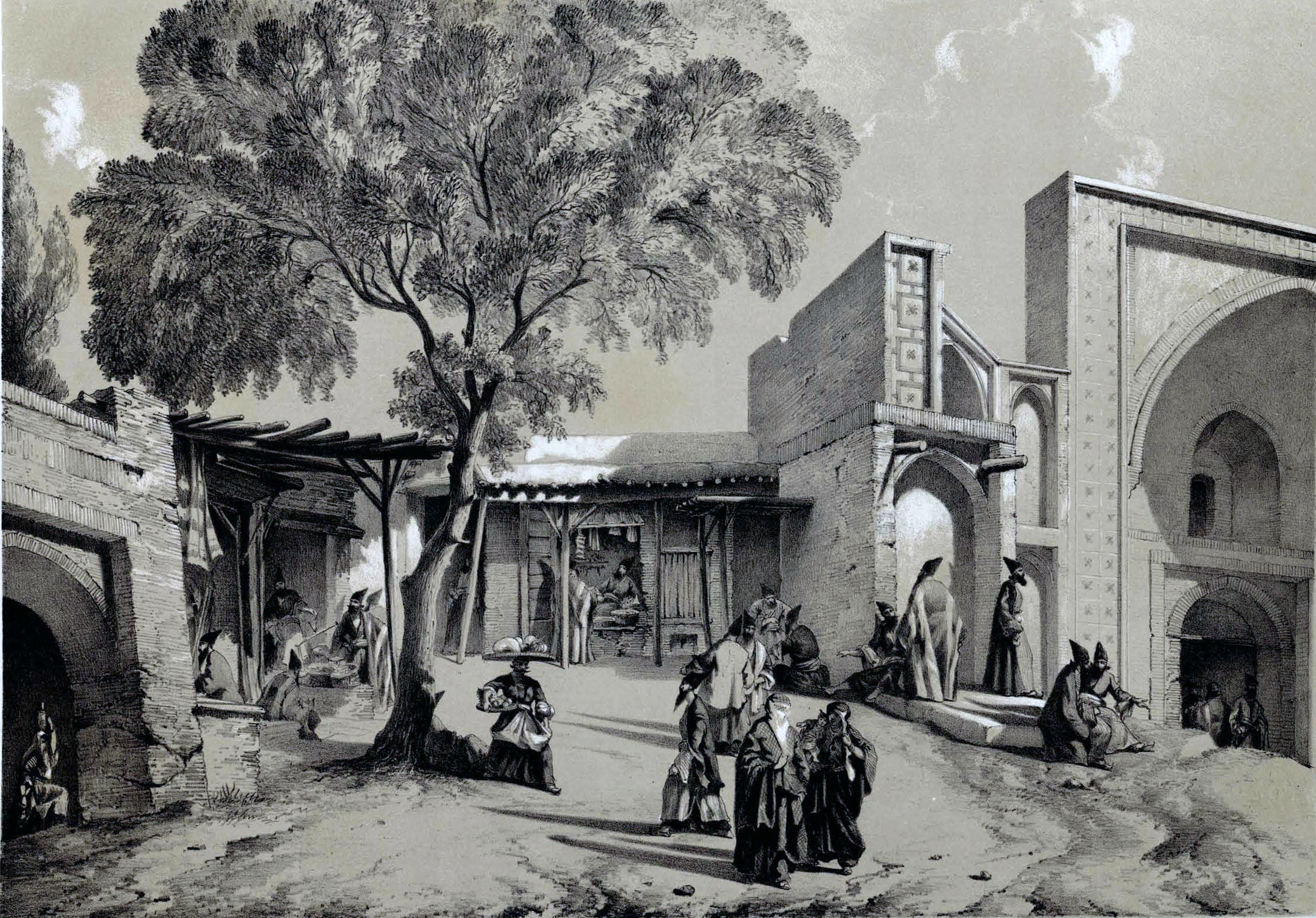
Bazaar and mosque entrance, Qazvin

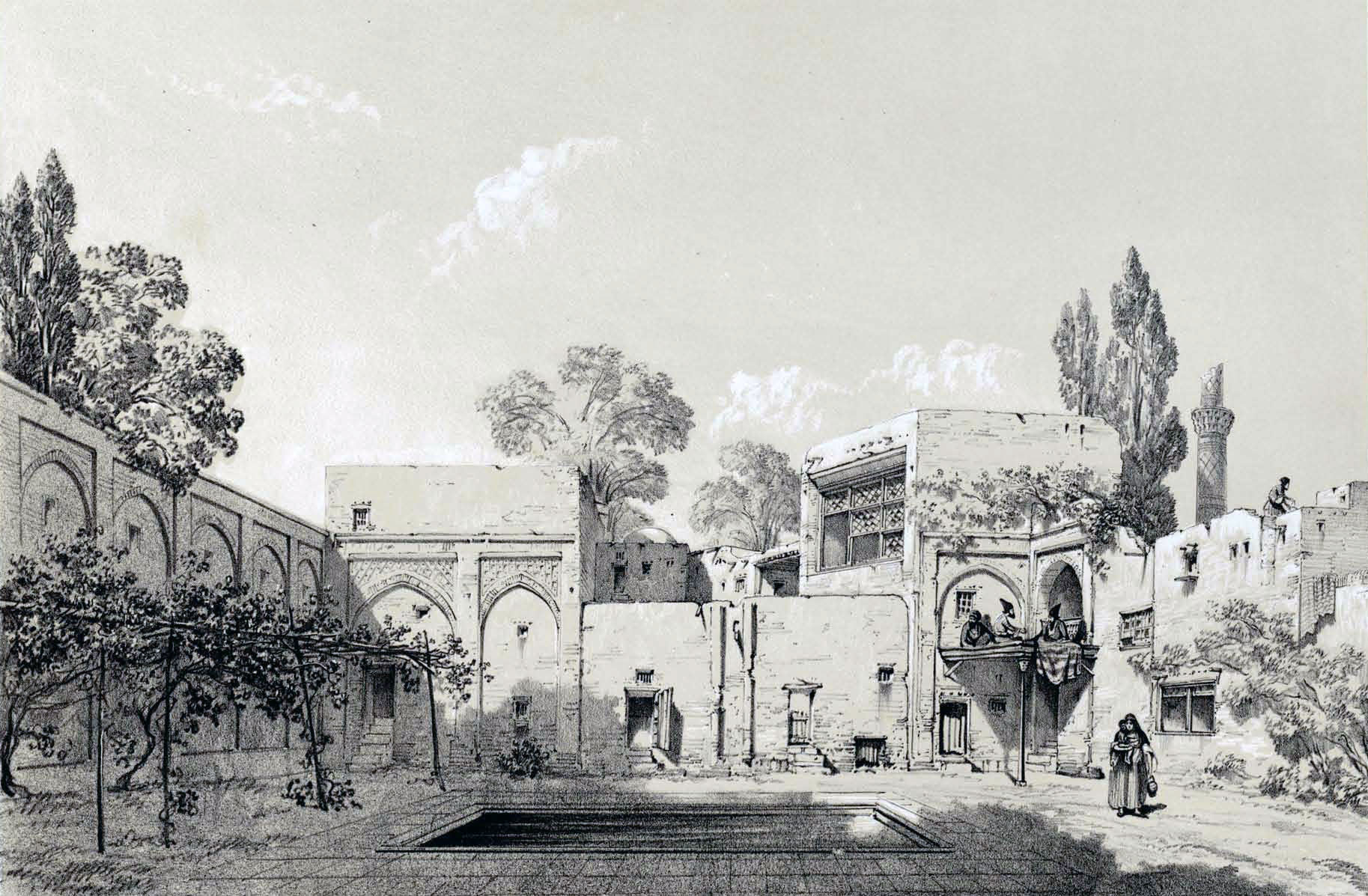
Inside a house, Qazvin

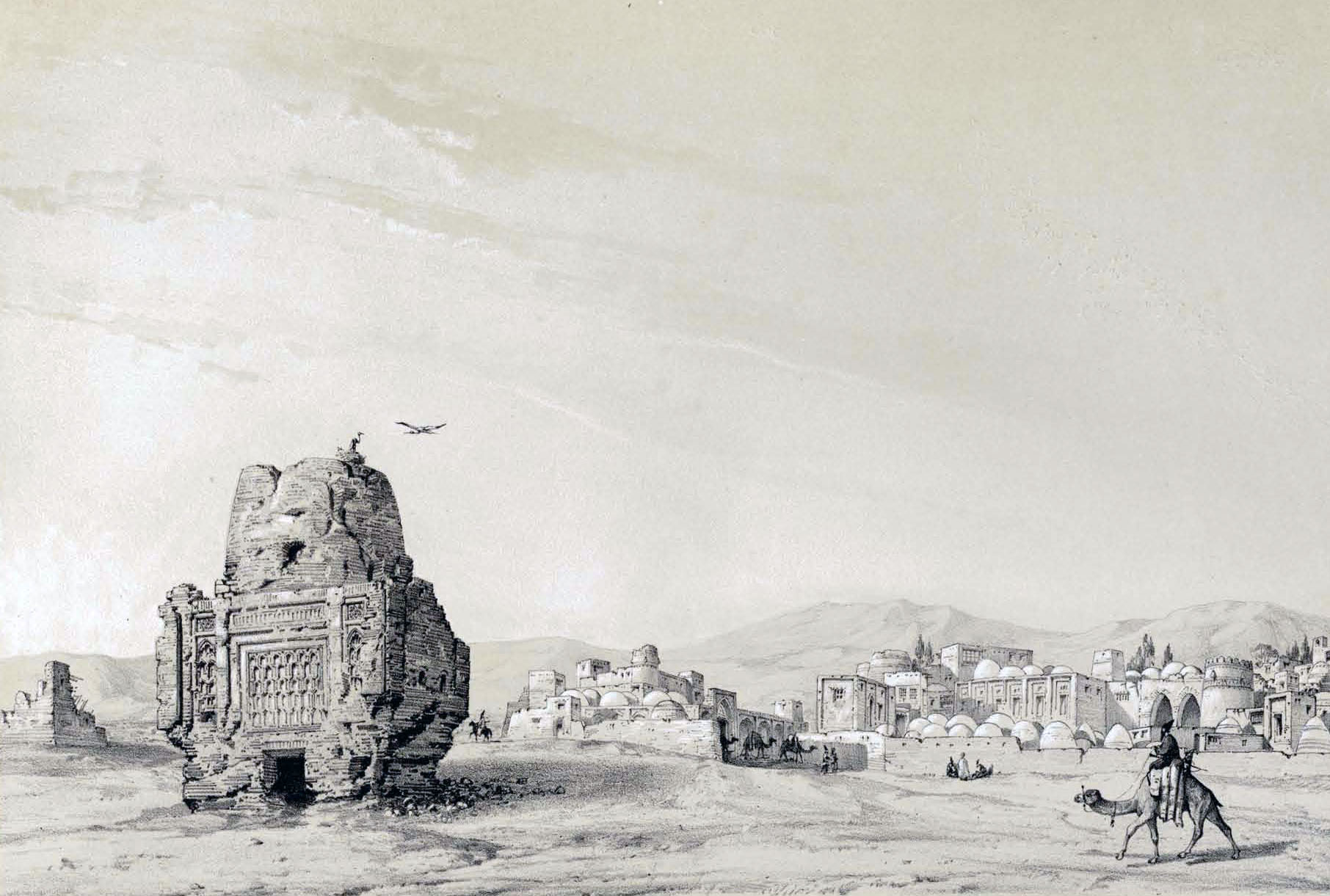
Village Siadeh (Takestan)

=== Pascal Coste ===
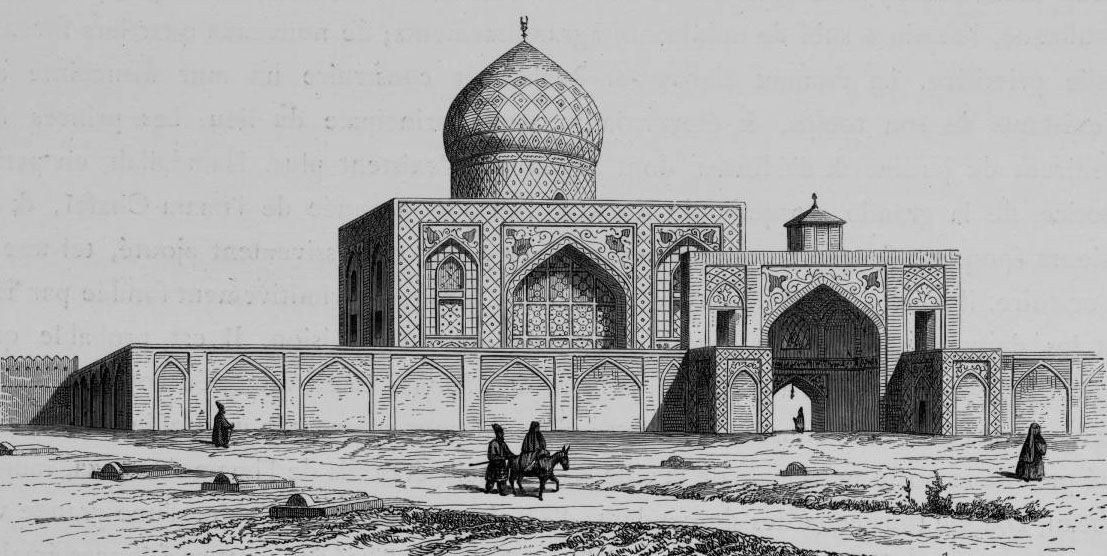
Mosque and tomb Qazvin

== Tehran; Solimanieh (Karaj) ==
=== Eugène Flandin ===
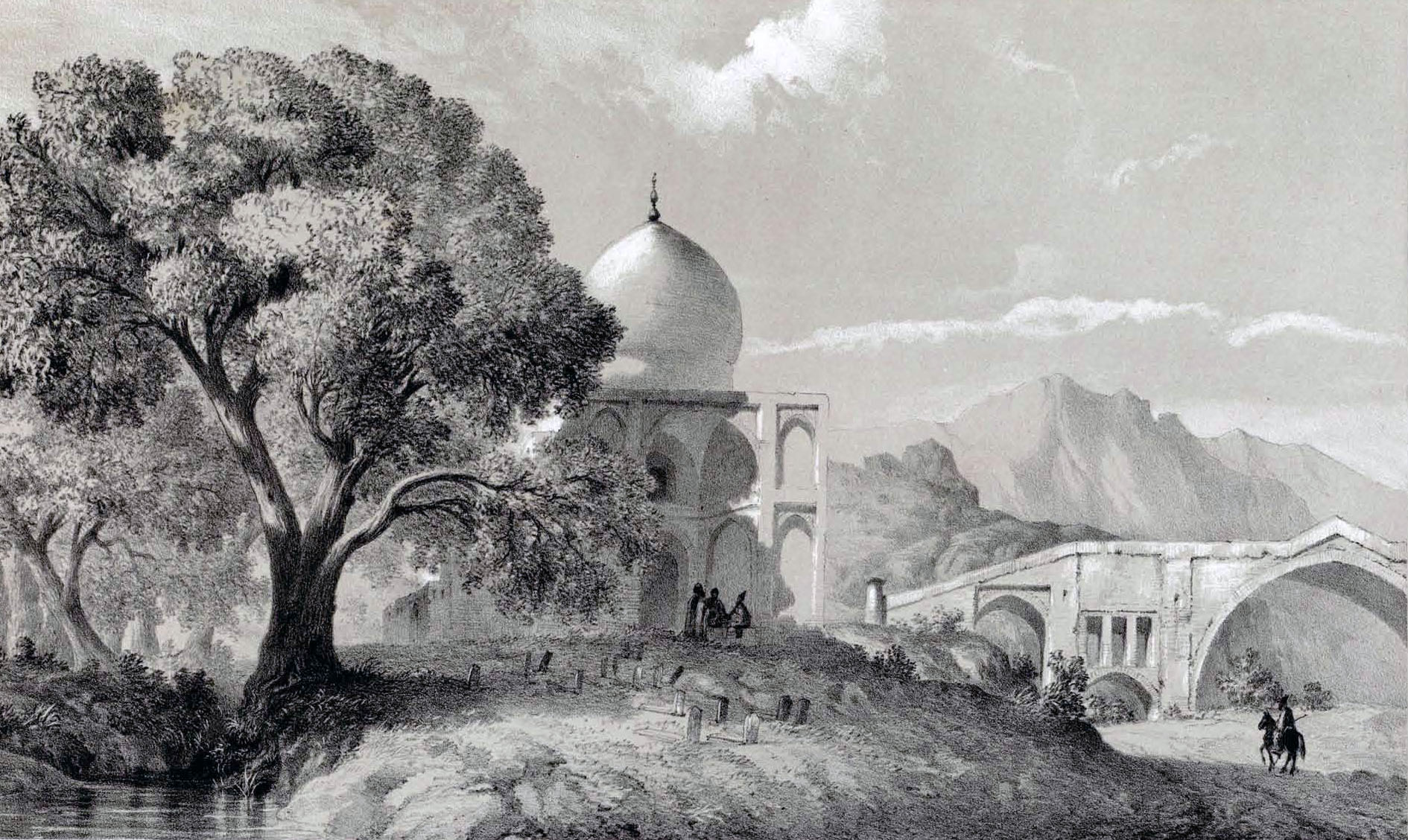
Imam Zadeh and bridge Solimanyeh (Karaj)

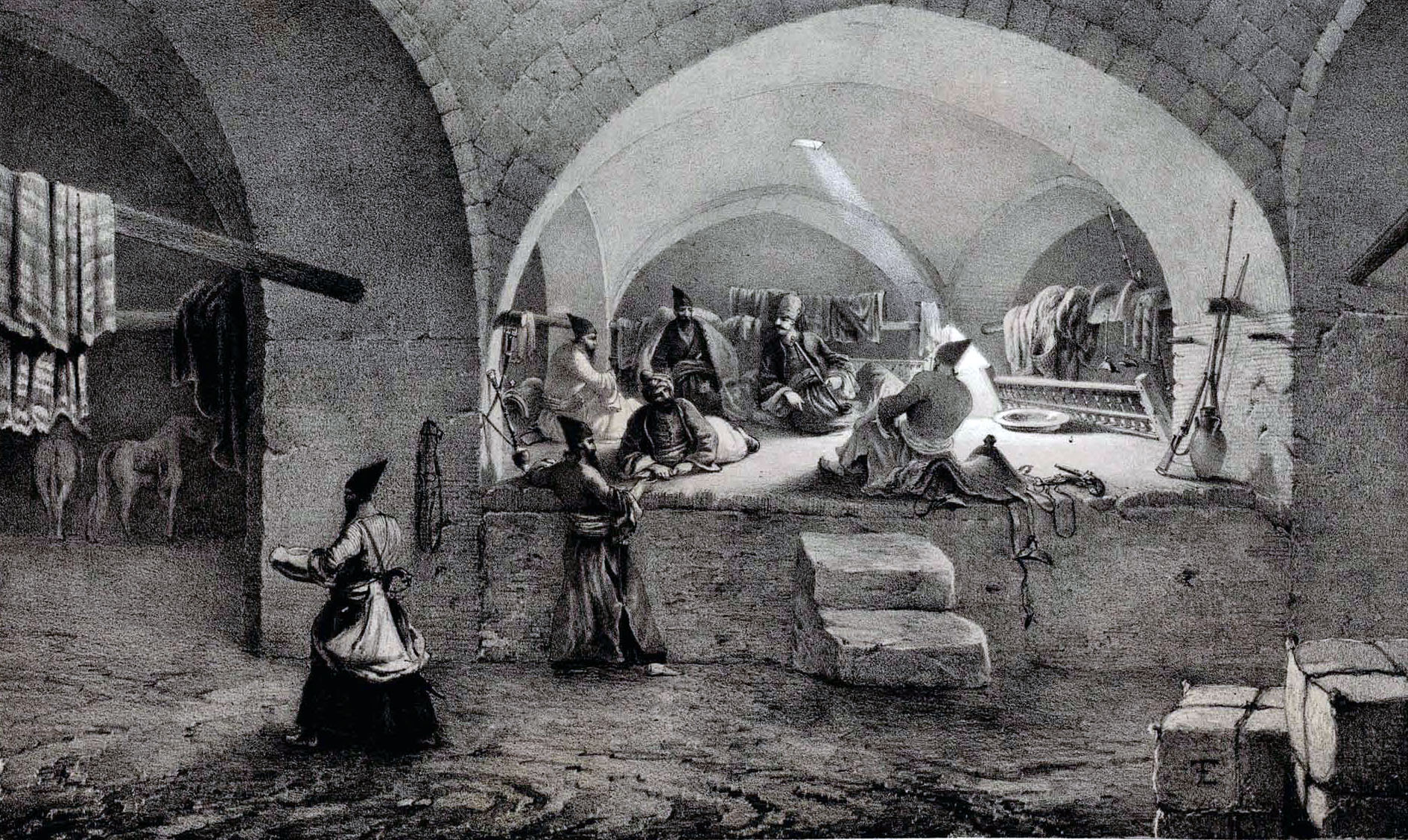
Inside a stable

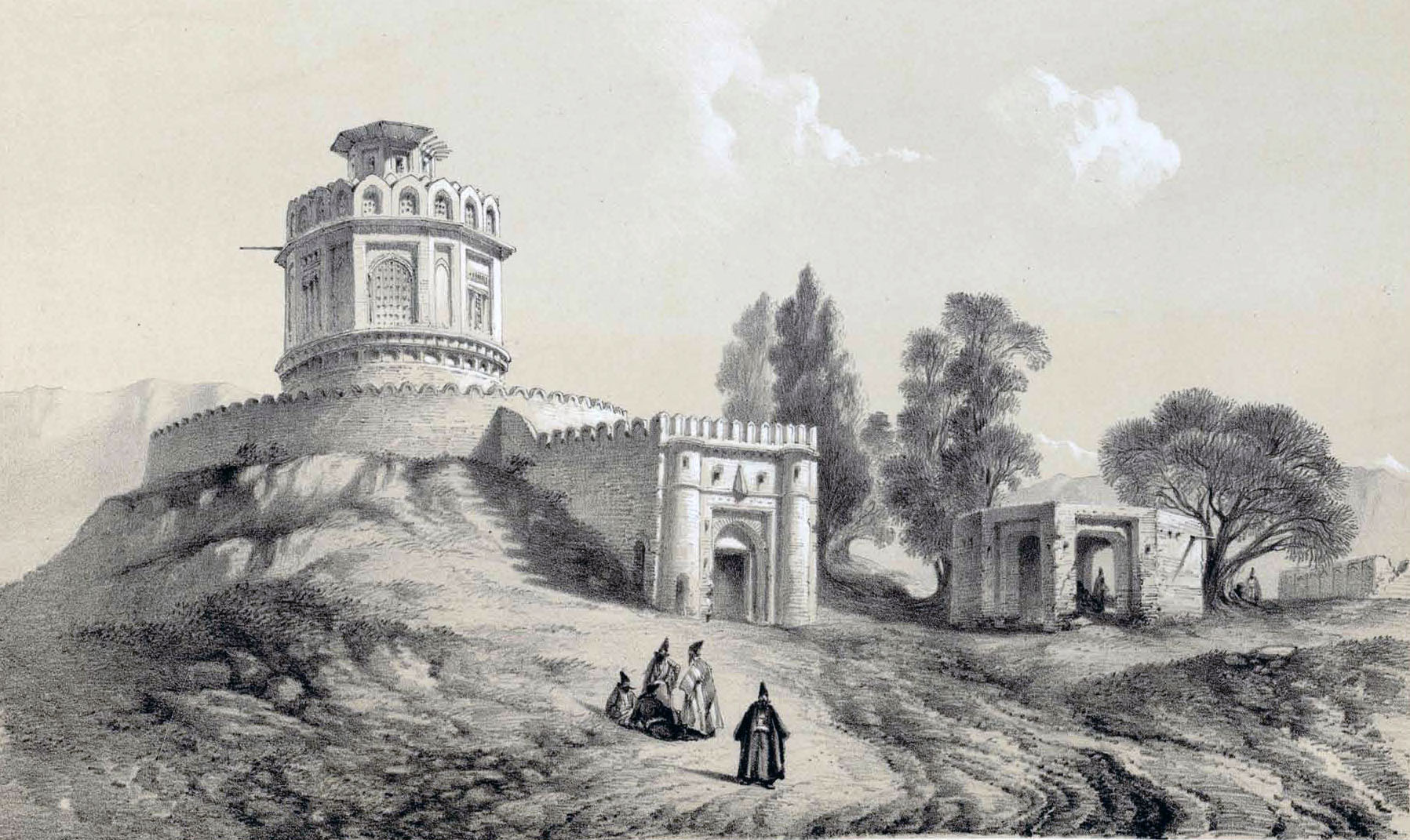
Barout khaneh near Tehran. This is the only drawing remains of this destroyed gunpowder magazine.

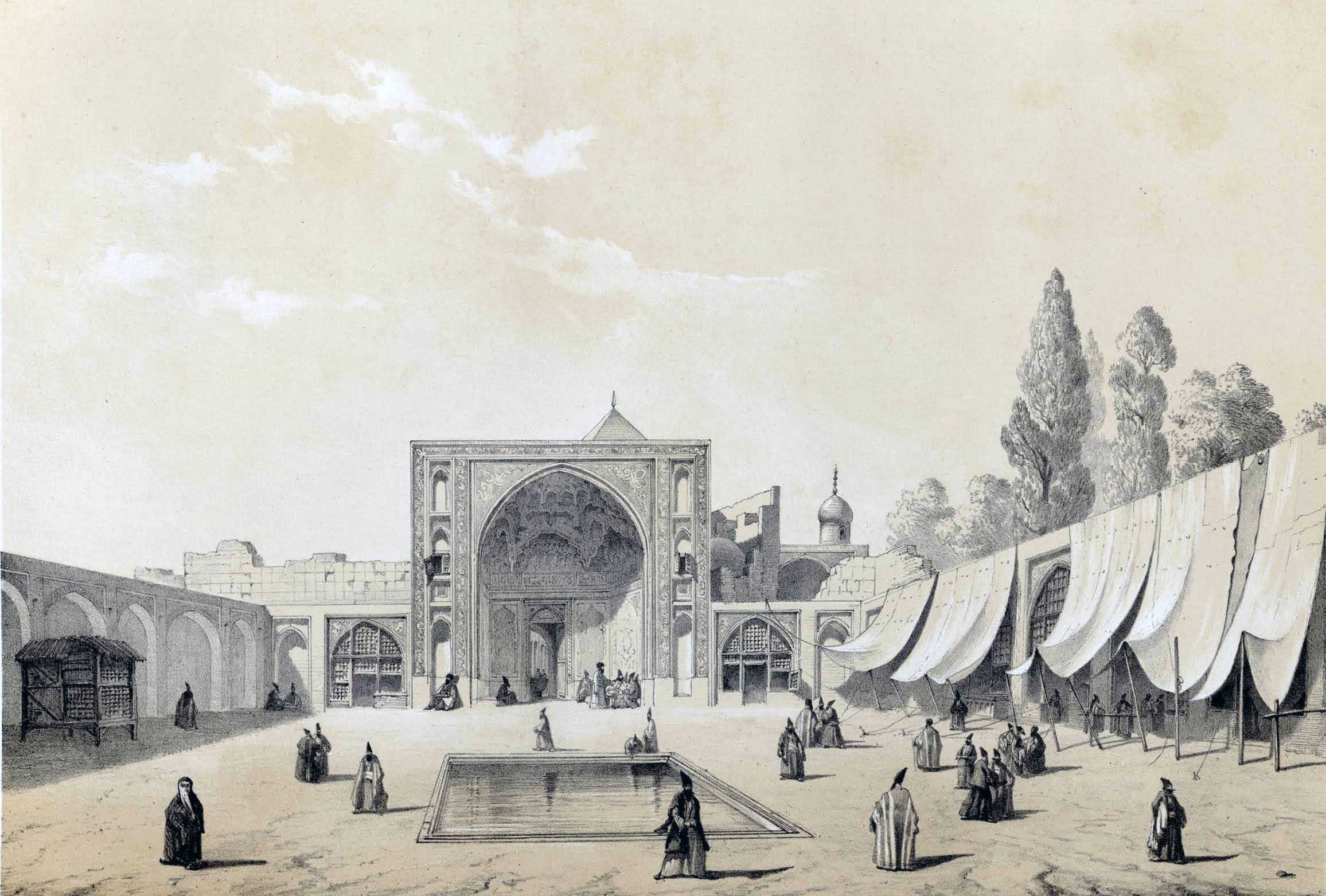
Masjid i Shah, or Royal Mosque, Tehran

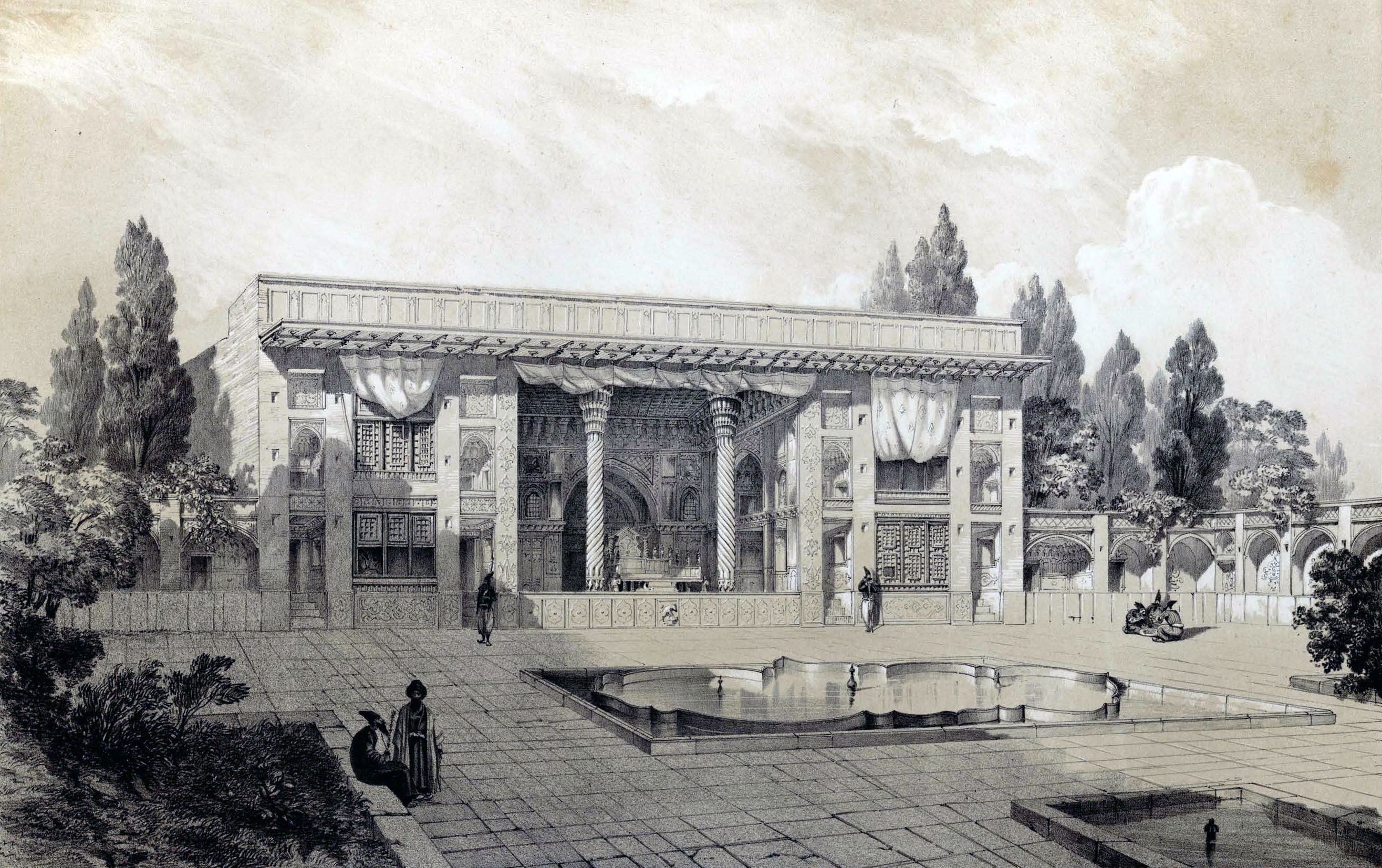
Exterior view of the throne room, Tehran

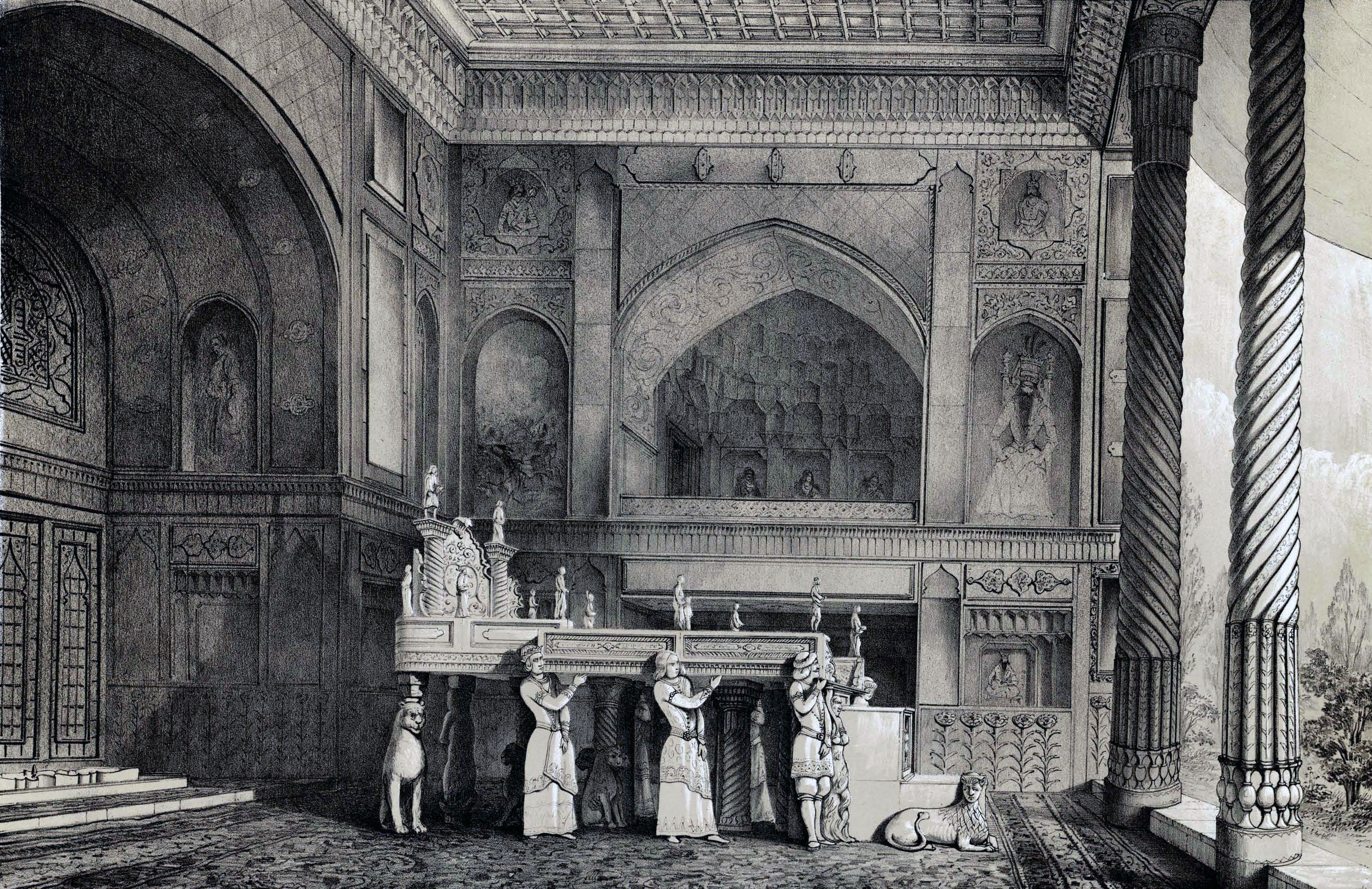
Inside the throne room, Tehran

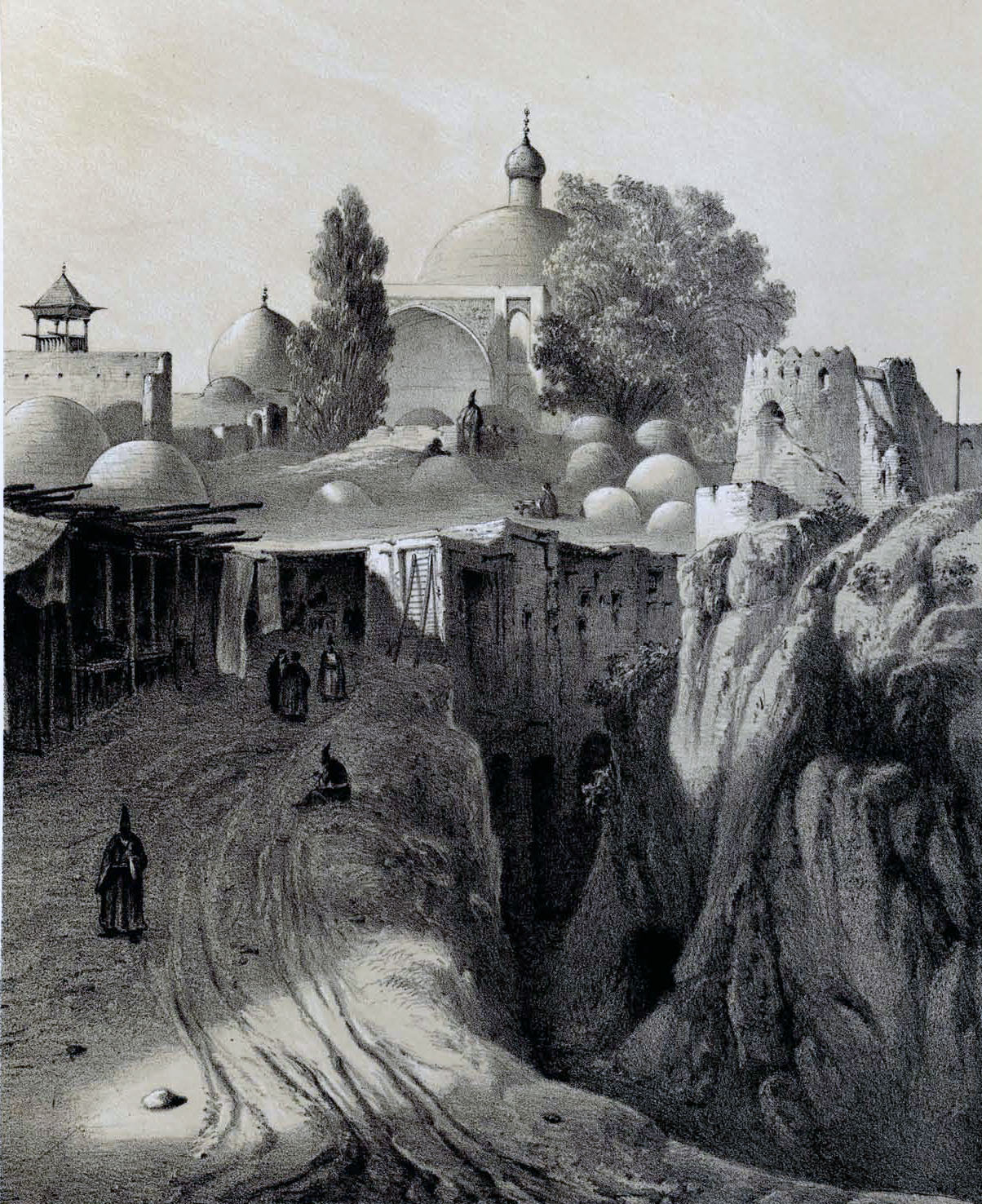
Streets of Tehran

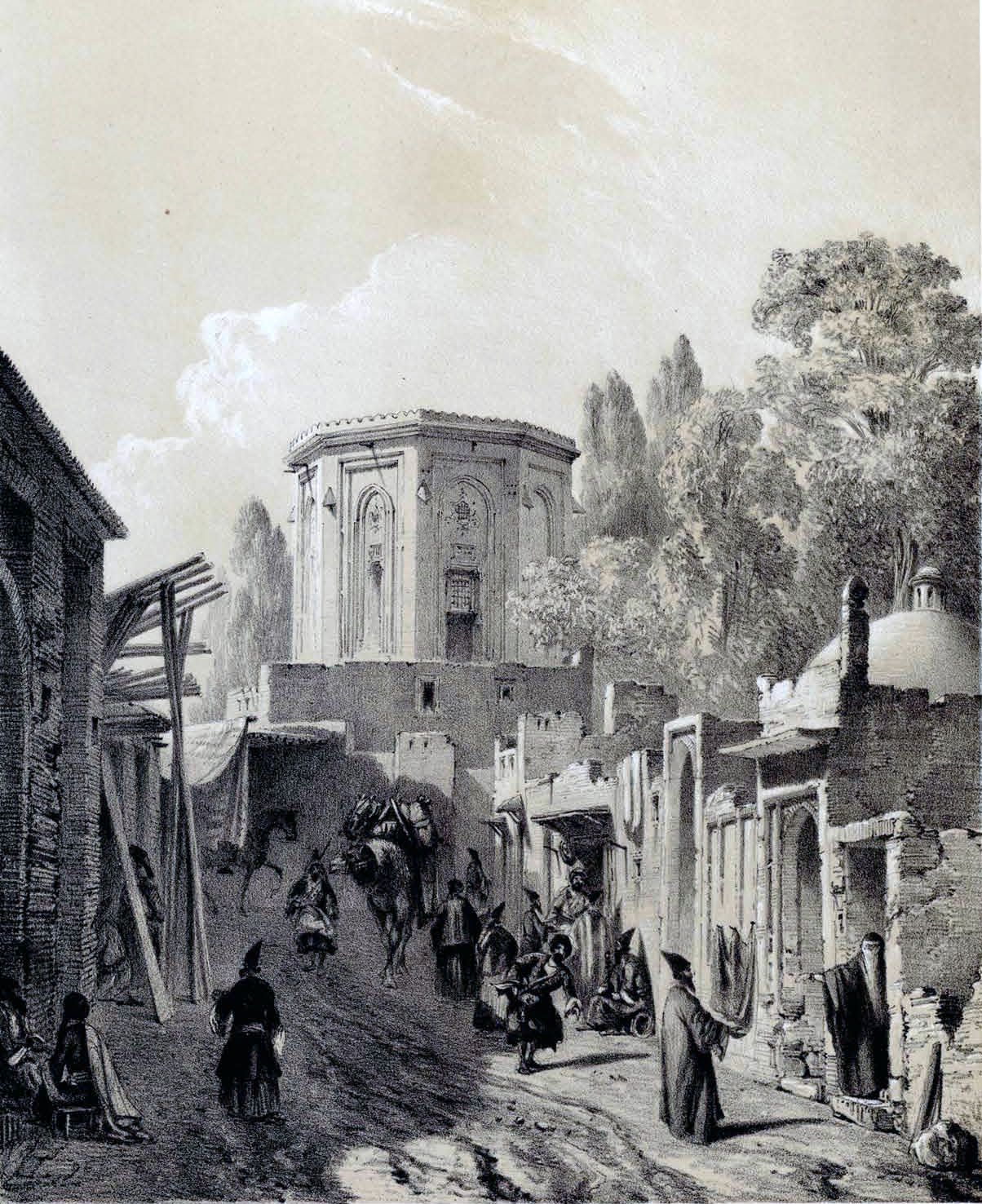
Streets of Tehran

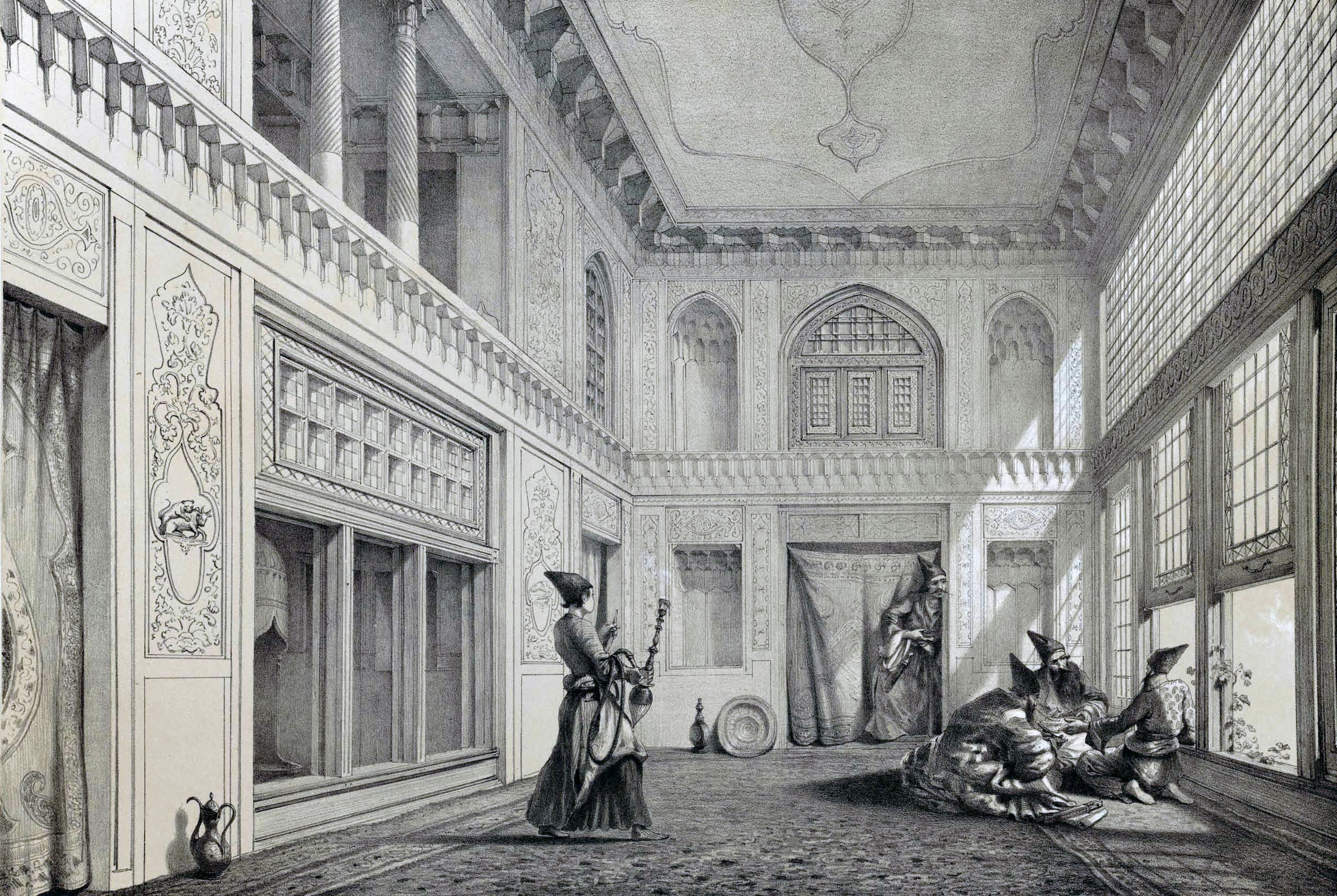
Inside an apartment or Divan Khaneh, Tehran

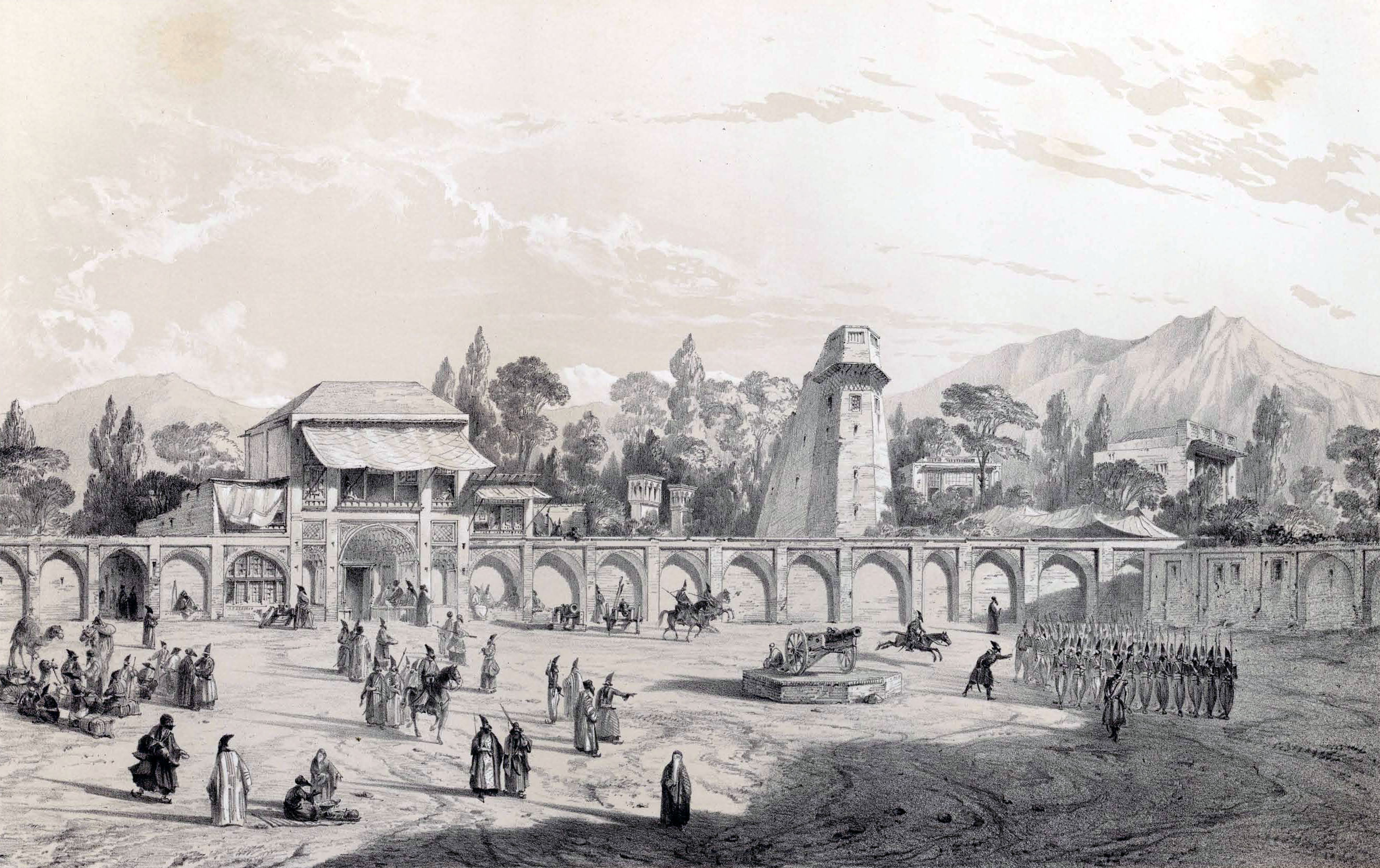
Meidan i Shah, Royal Square, Tehran

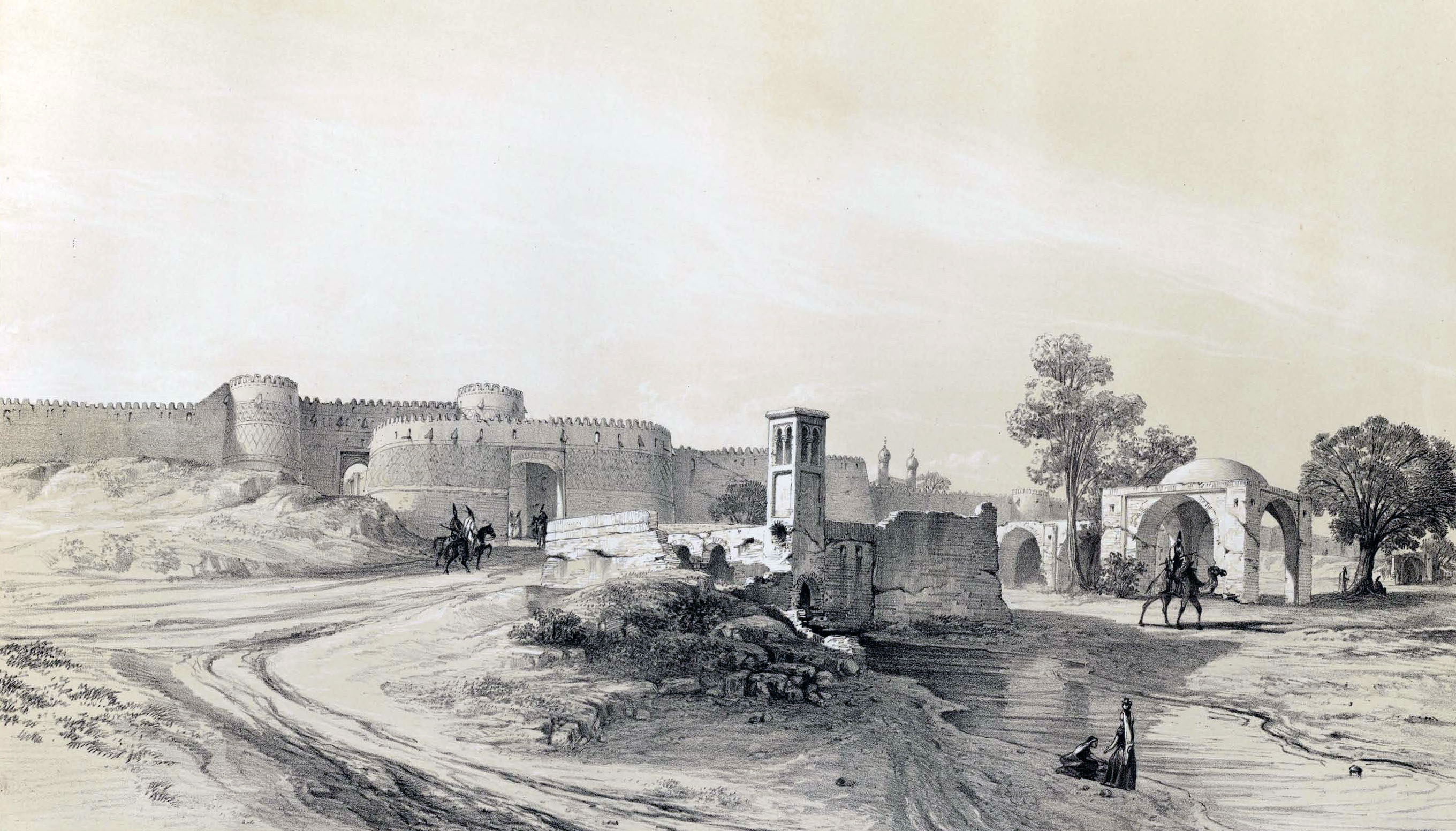
Shemran gate, Tehran

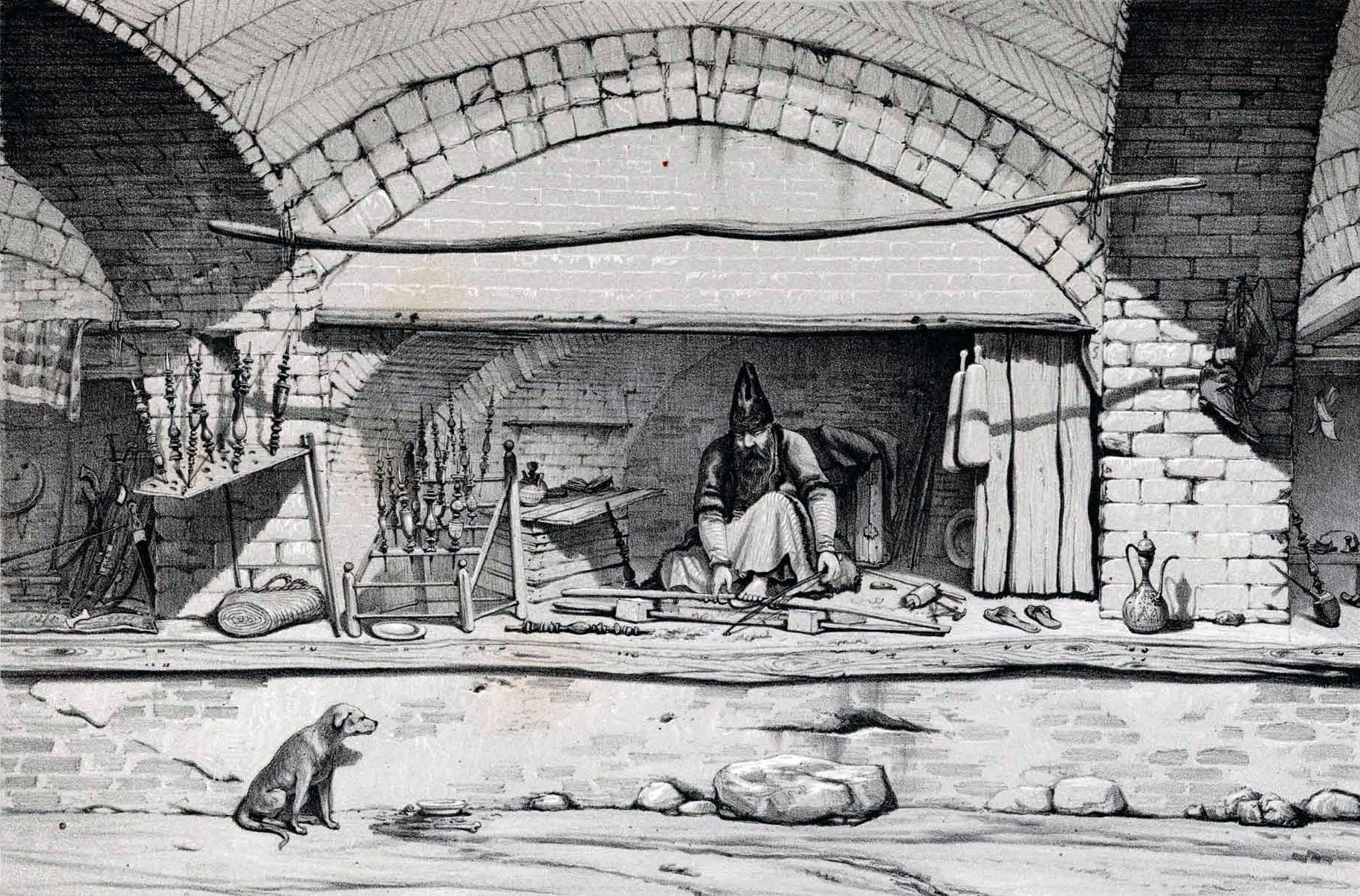
Turner Caliouns Tehran

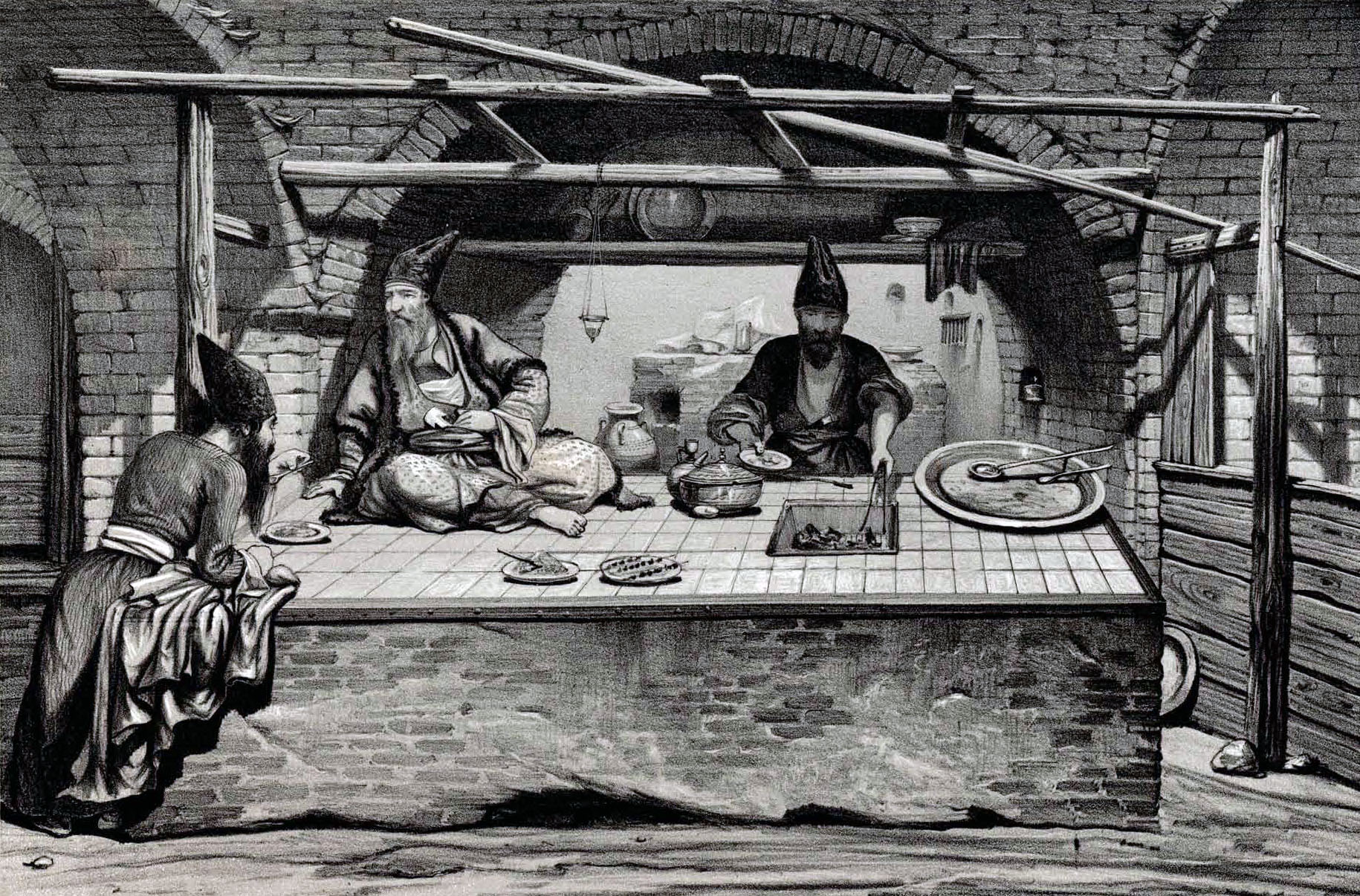
Kitchen Bazaar Tehran

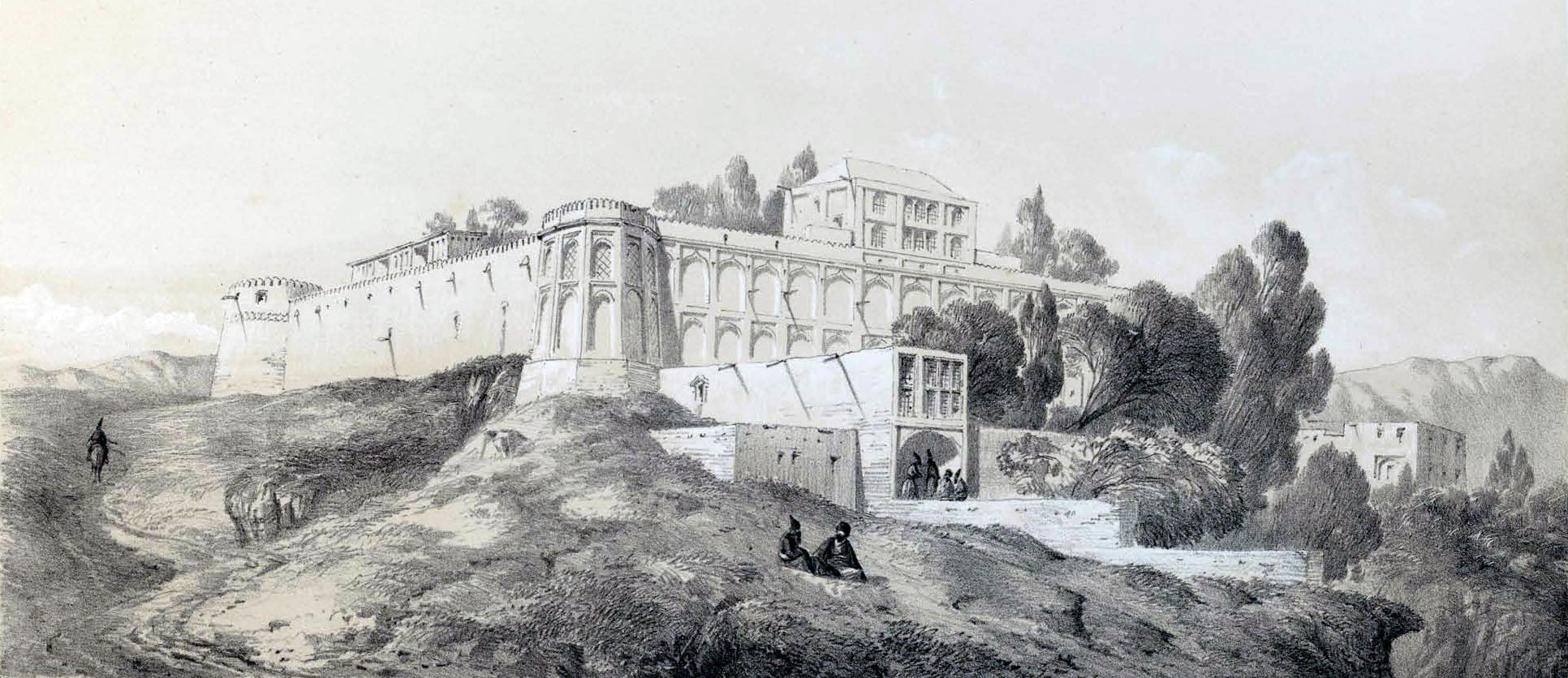
Palace of Qasr e Qajar, near Tehran

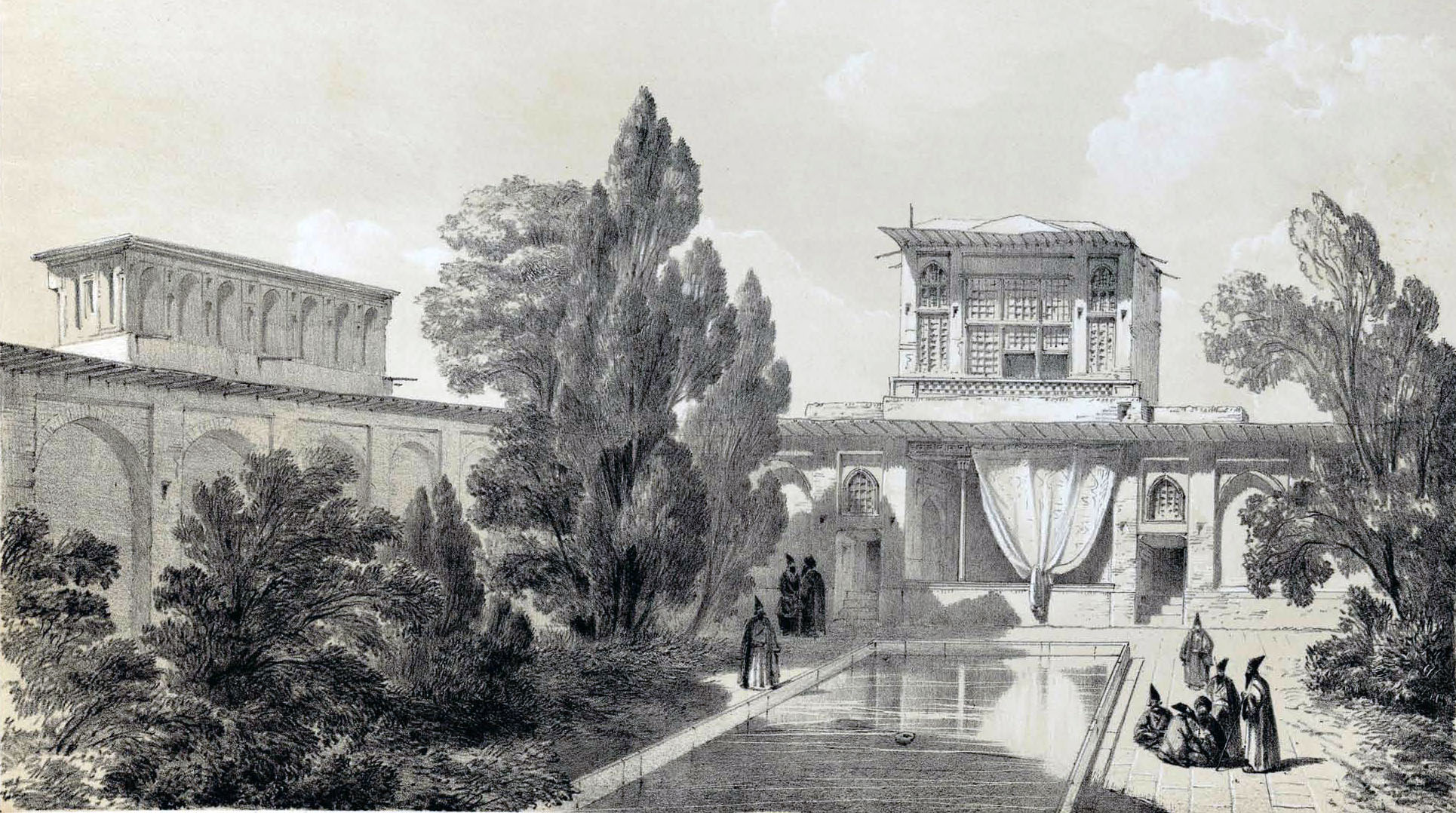
Courtyard of the Palace of Qasr e Qajar, near Tehran

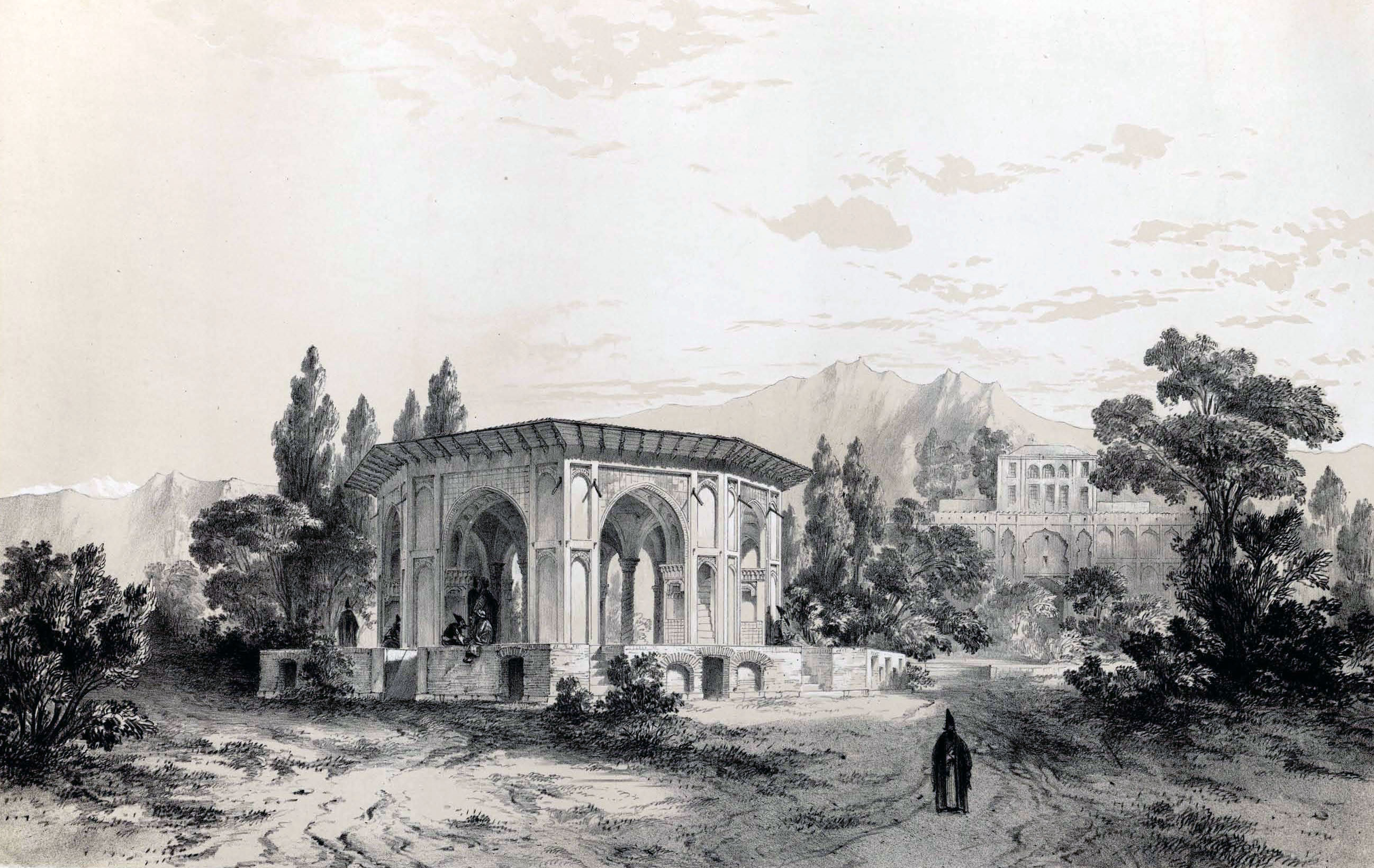
Gazebo and gardens of the palace of Qasr e Qajar, Tehran

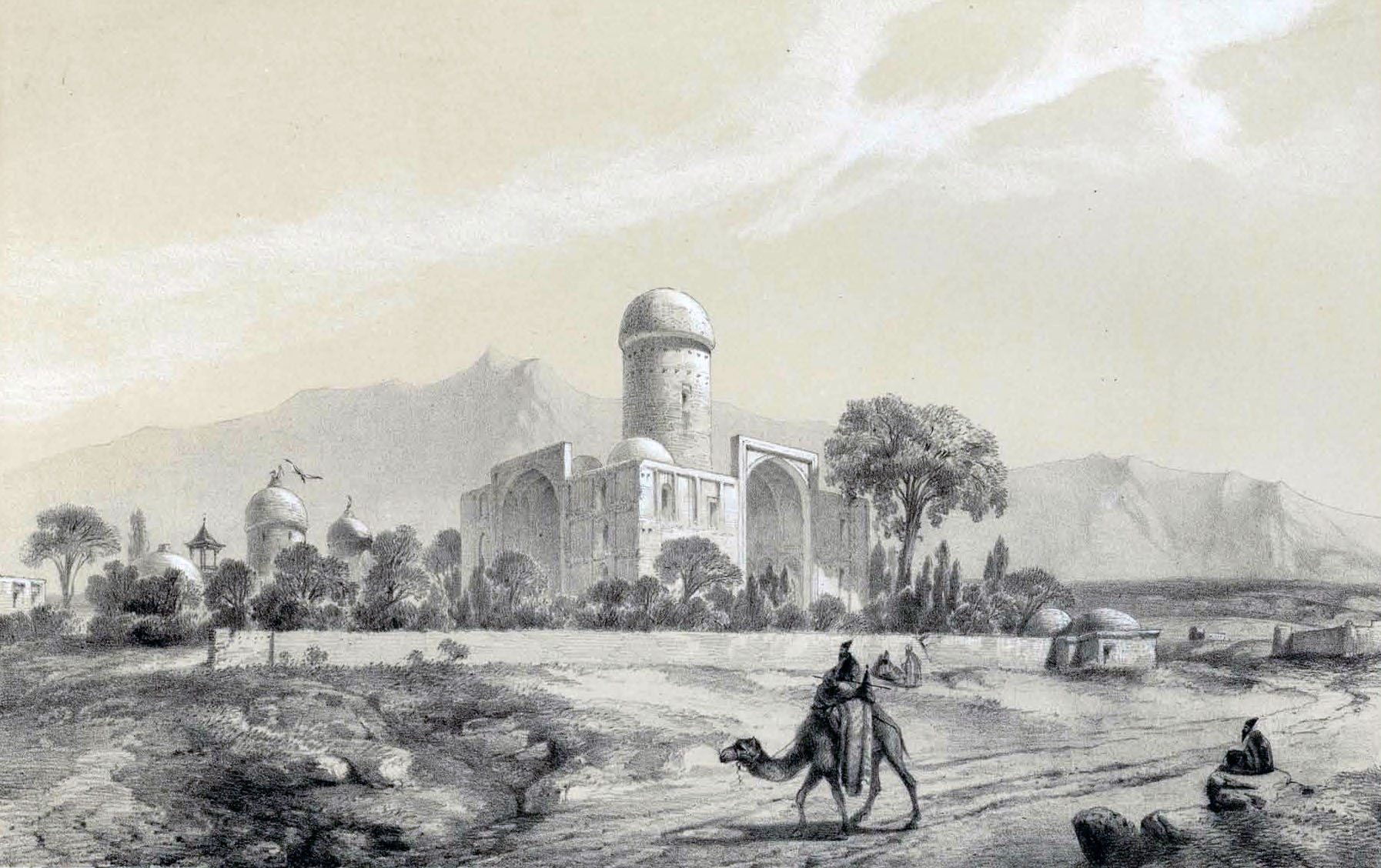
Shah-Abdol-Azim shrine, near Tehran

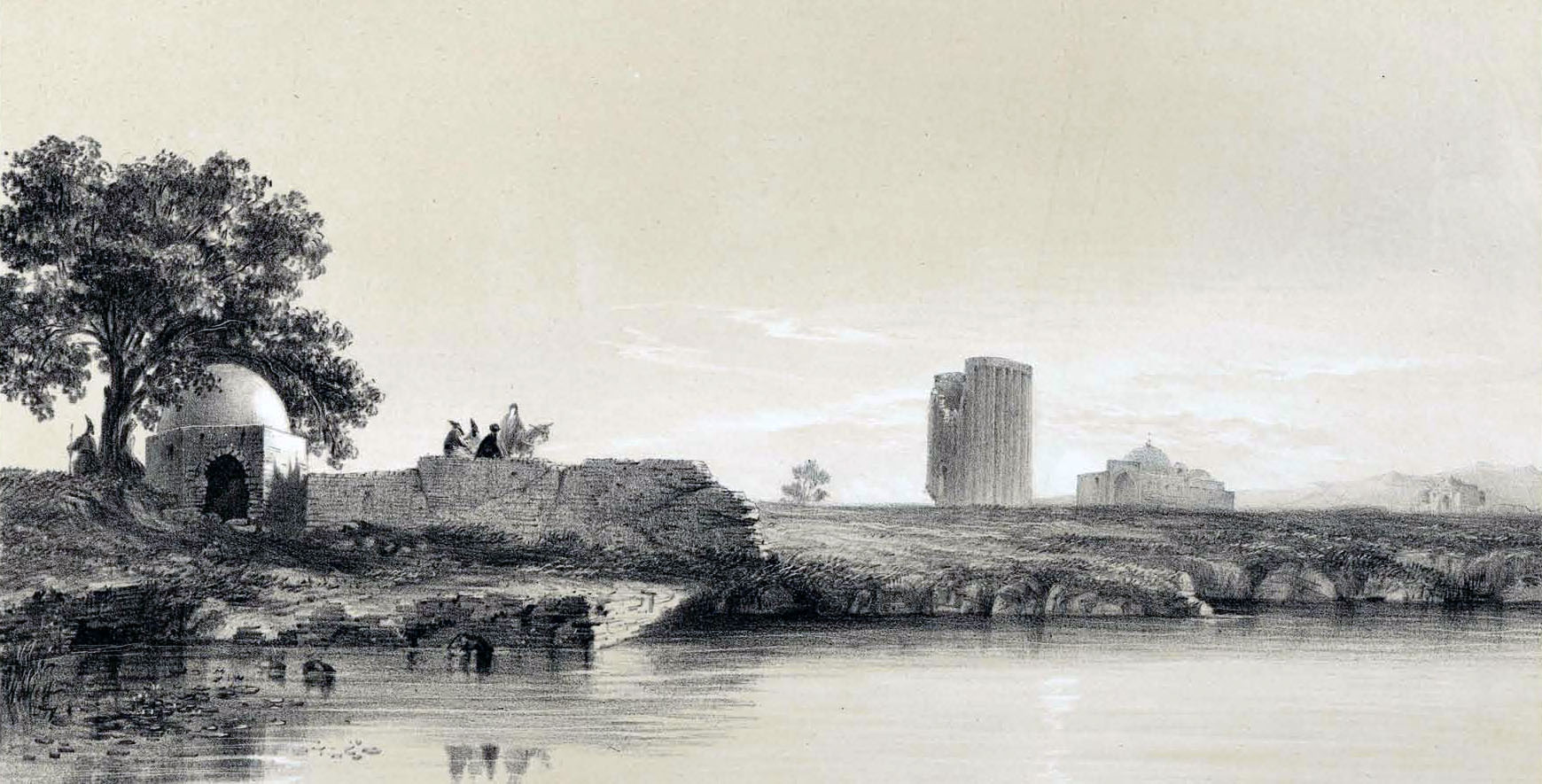
Caliph Yezid Tower (Tughrul Tower), Rey

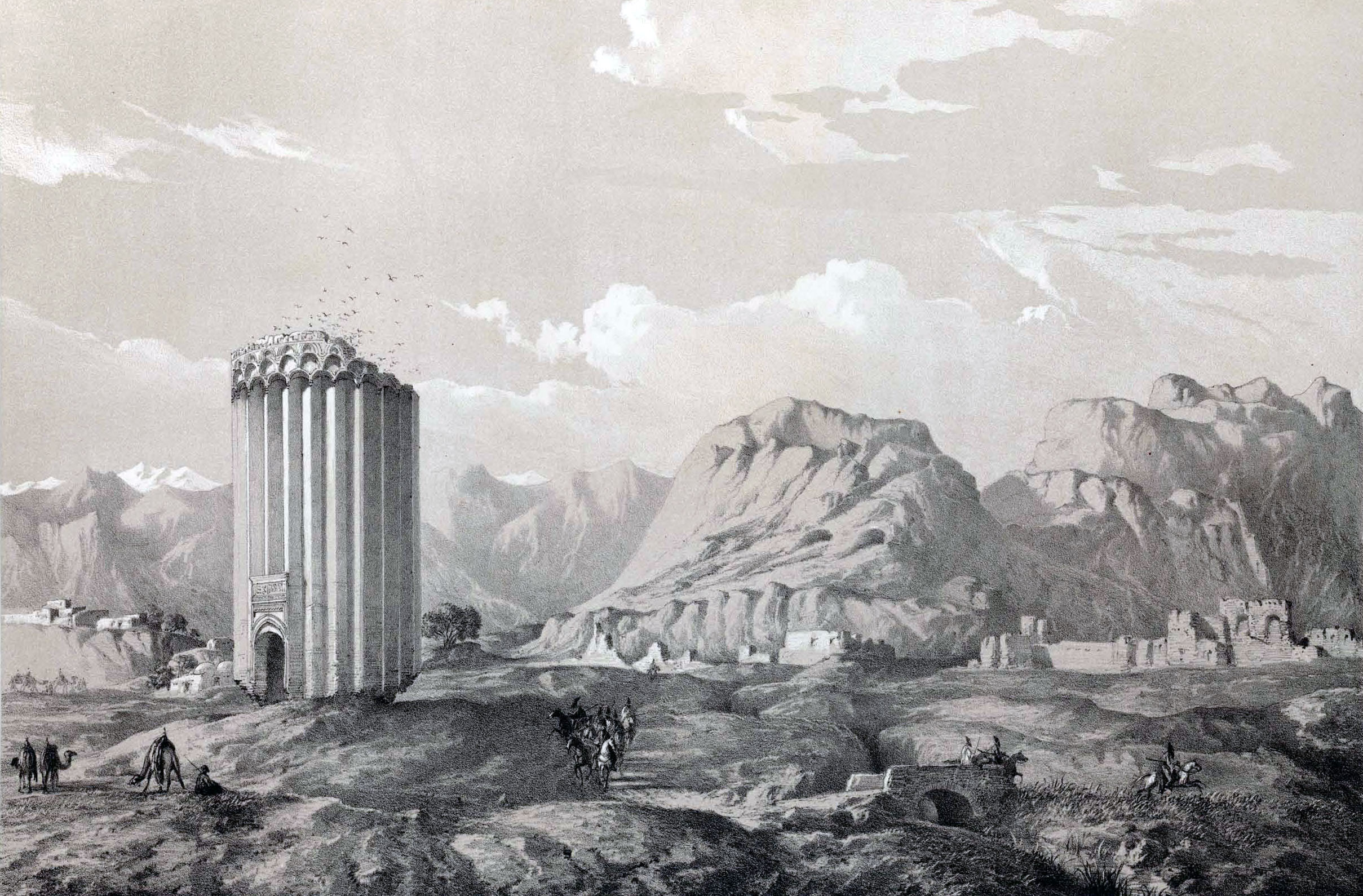
Yezid Tower (Tughrul Tower) and ruins of Rey, near Tehran

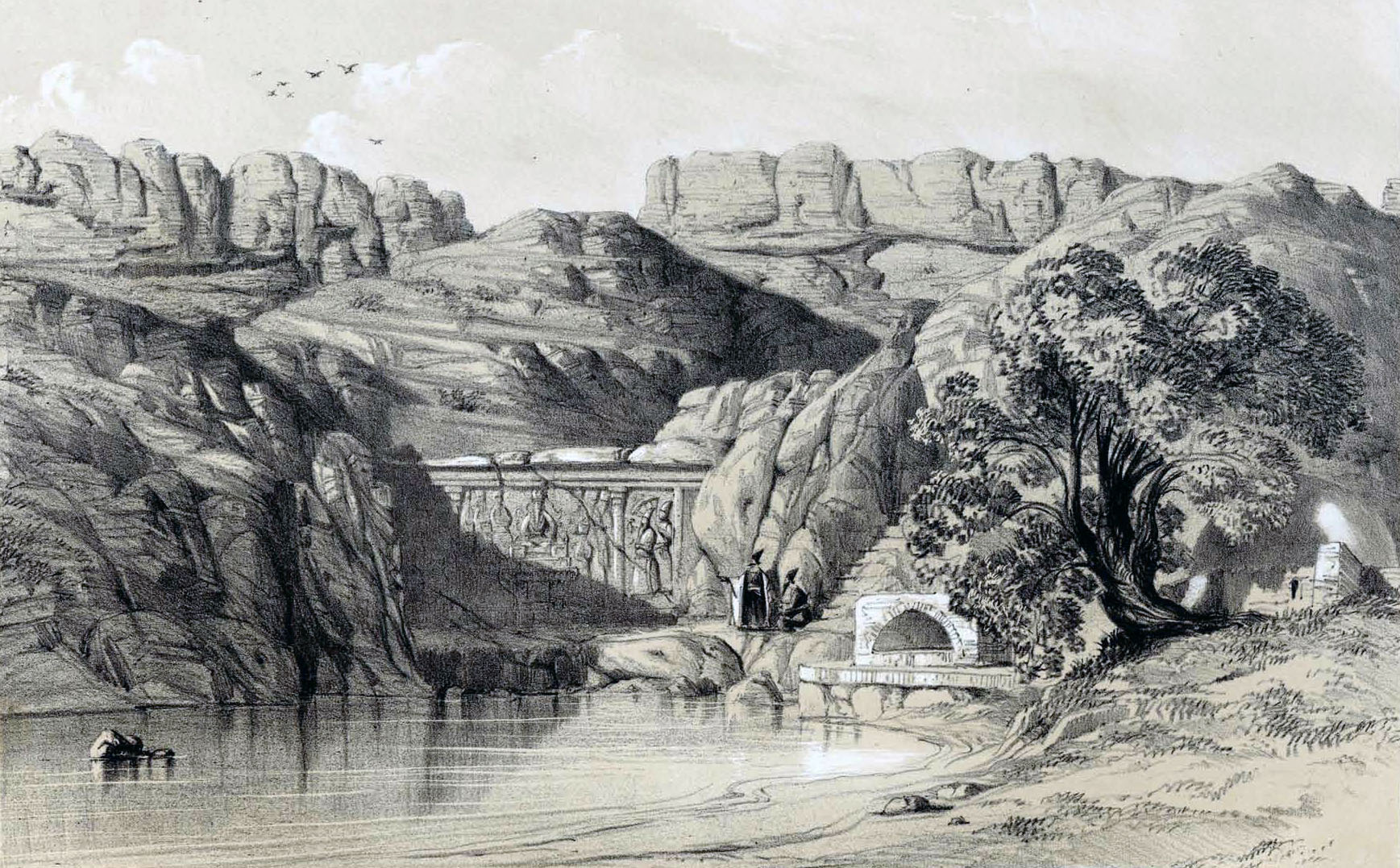
Cheshmeh-Ali (Shahr-e-Rey)

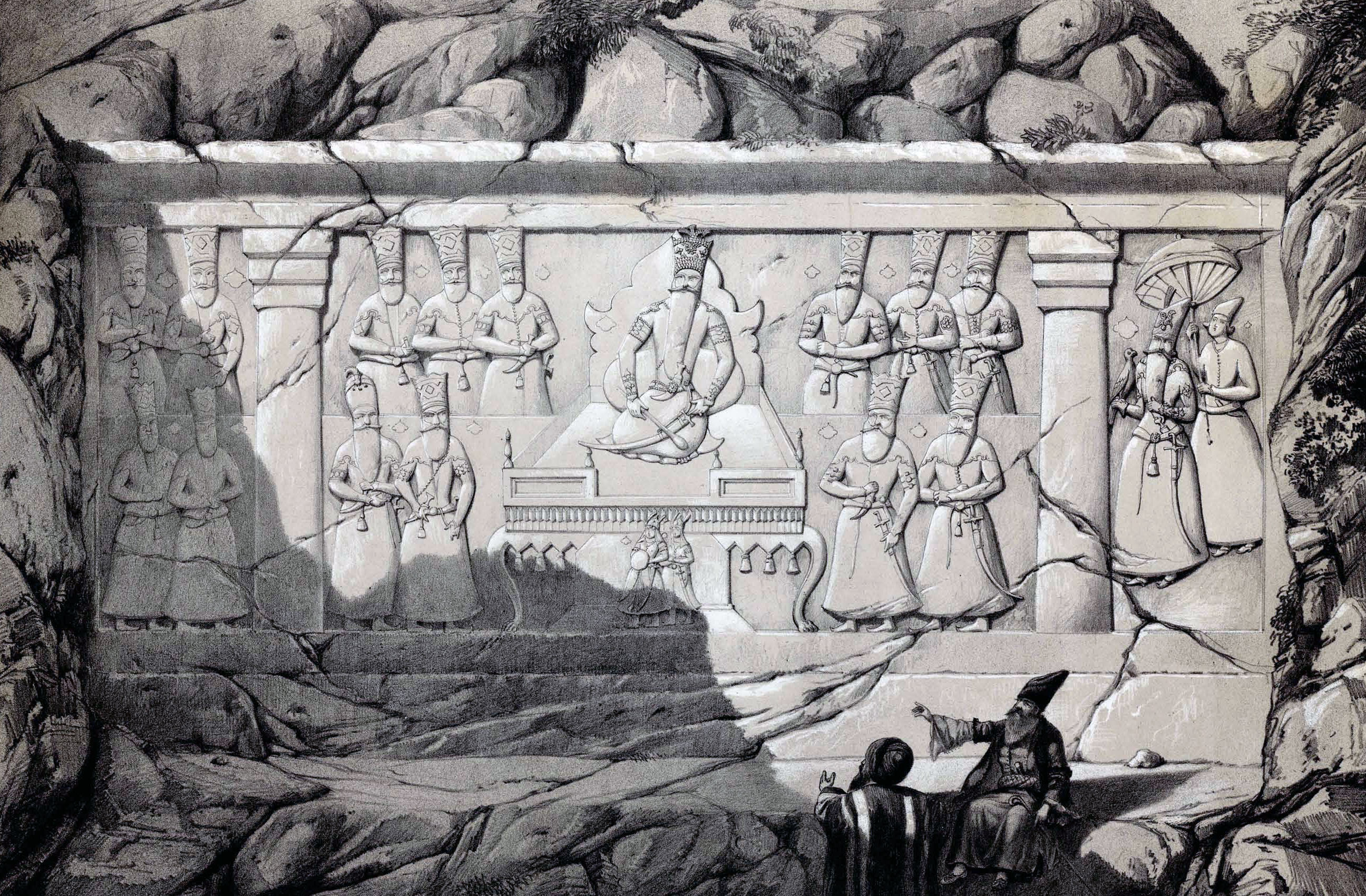
Fath Ali shah inscription in Cheshmeh-Ali (Shahr-e-Rey) in south of Tehran

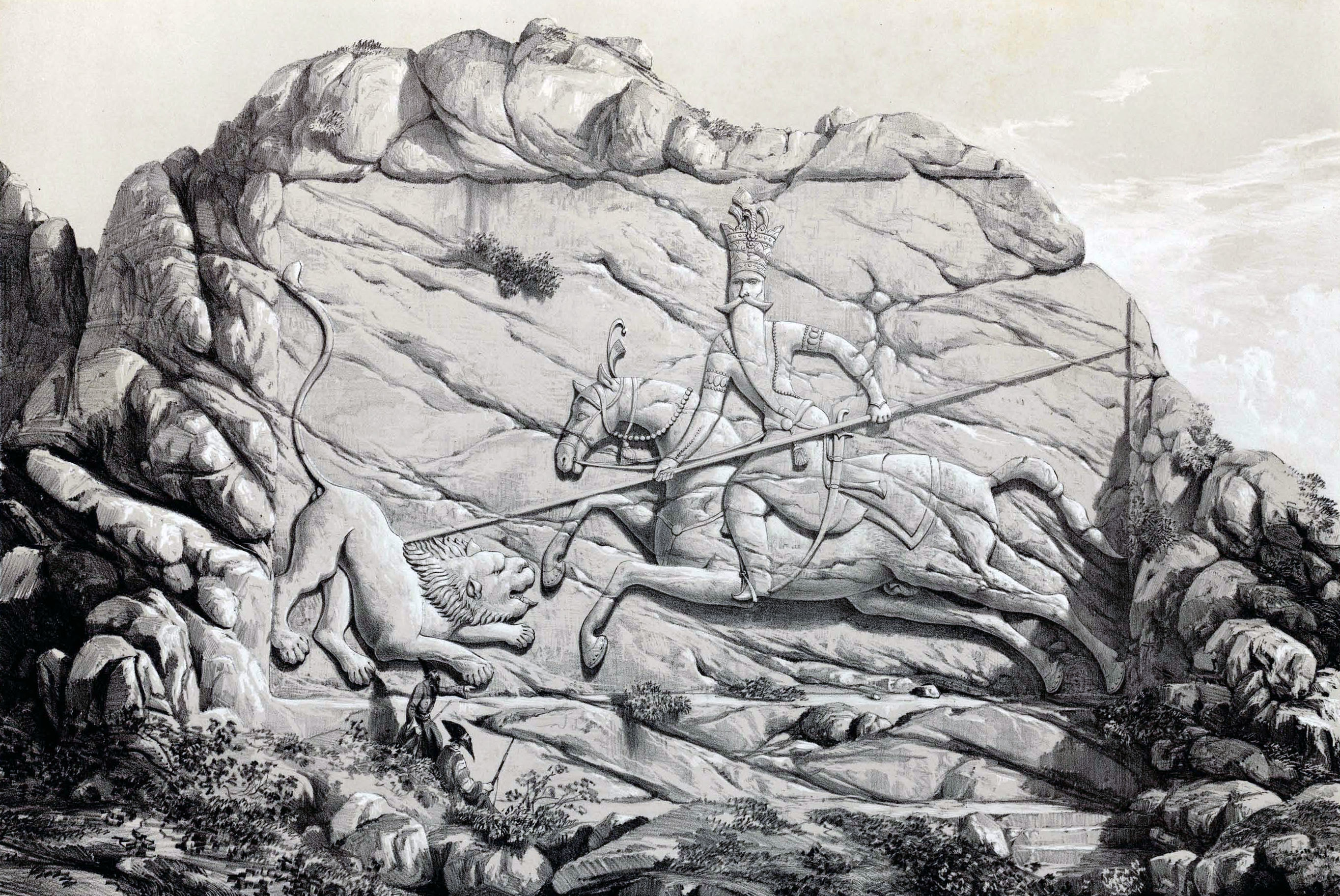
Fath Ali shah inscription (Cheshmeh-Ali)

=== Pascal Coste ===
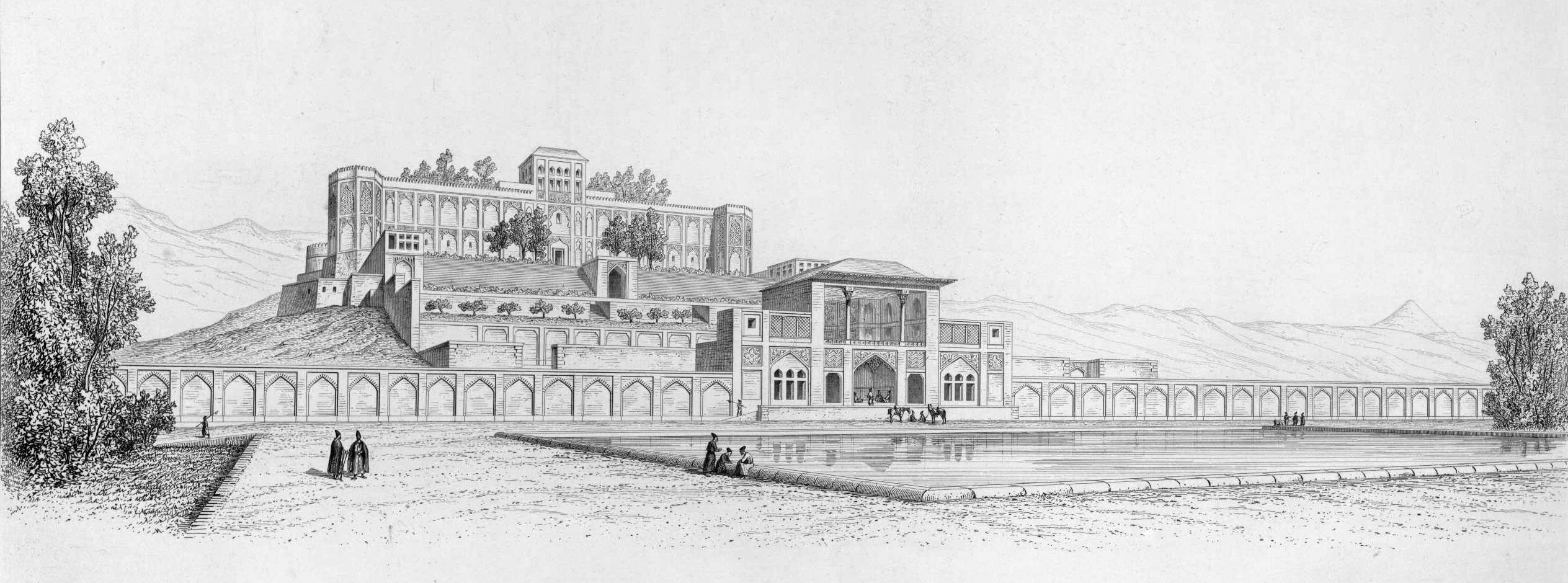
Perspective view, Castle of Qasr e Qajar, Tehran

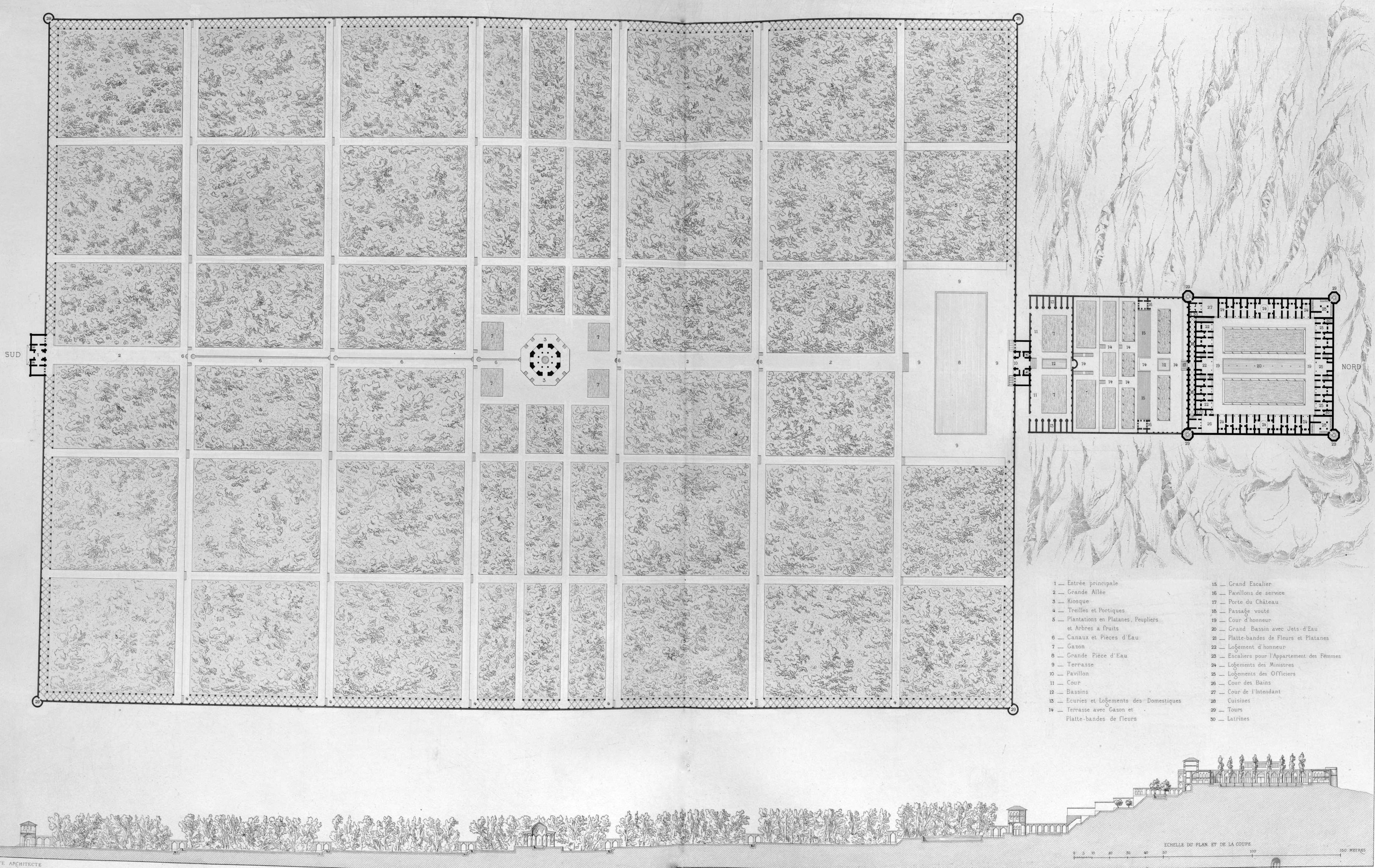
Plan and section, Castle of Qasr e Qajar, Tehran

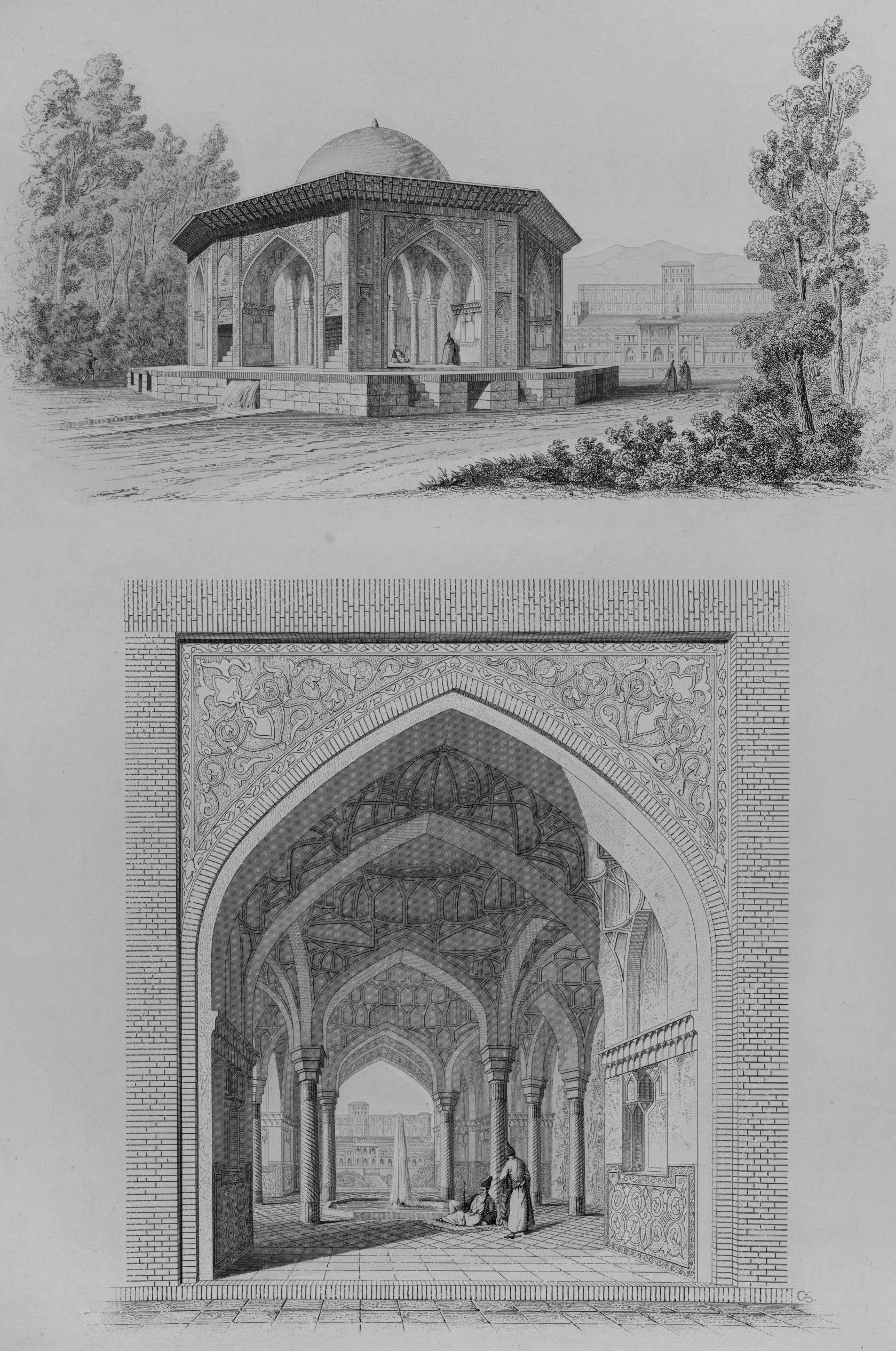
Kiosk, Castle of Qasr e Qajar, Tehran

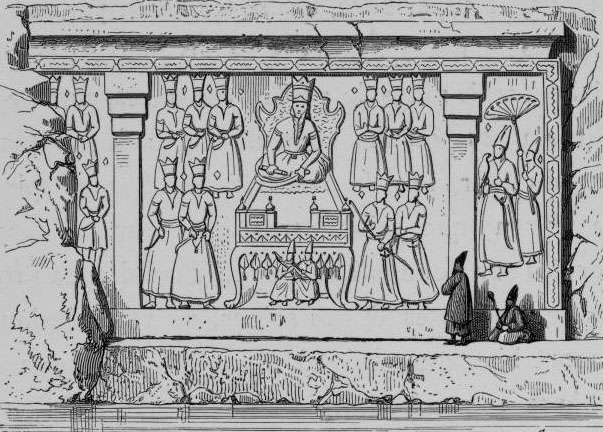
Relief of Rei

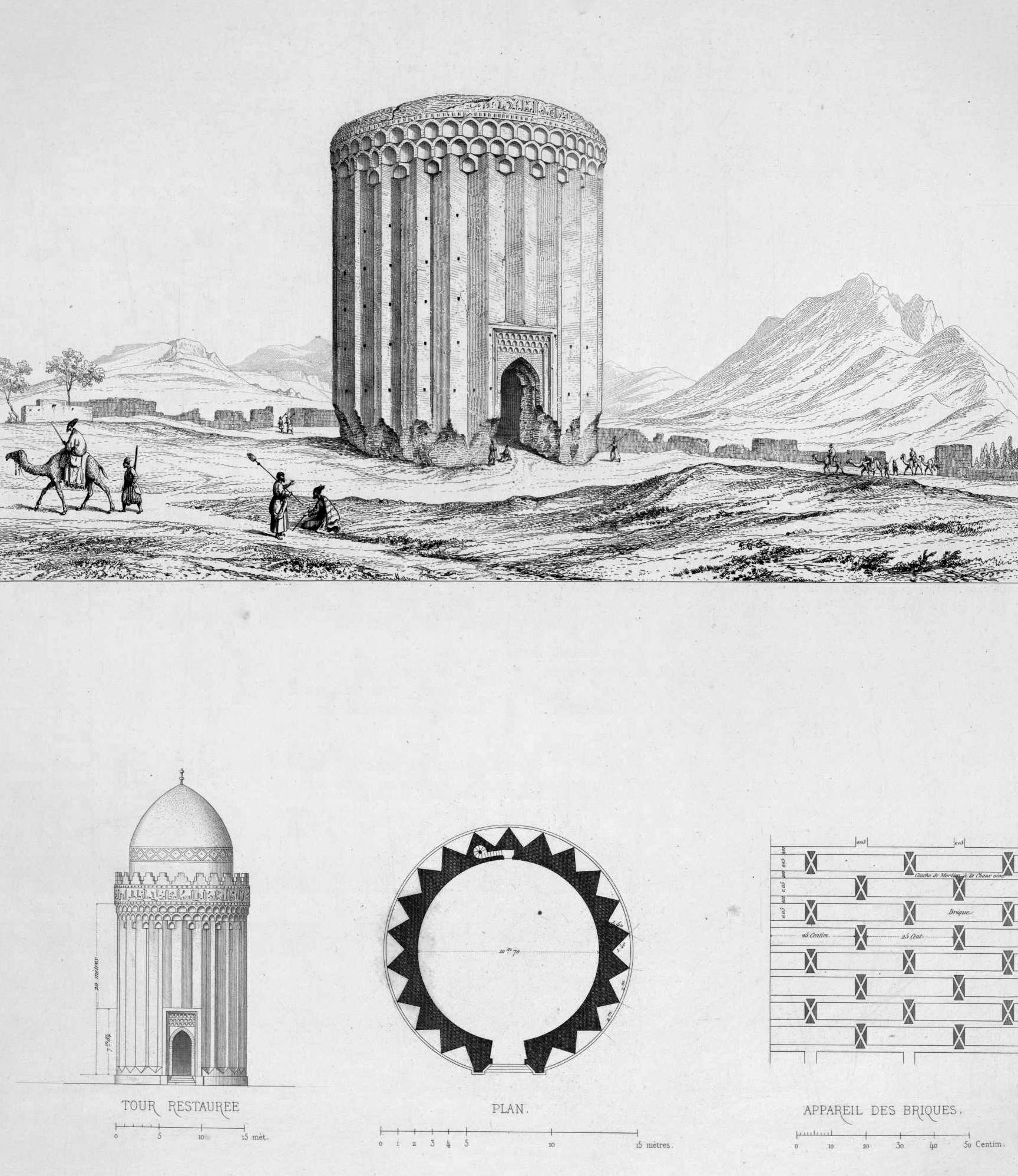
Details of the tower built of brick (Tughrul Tower), Ruins of Rei

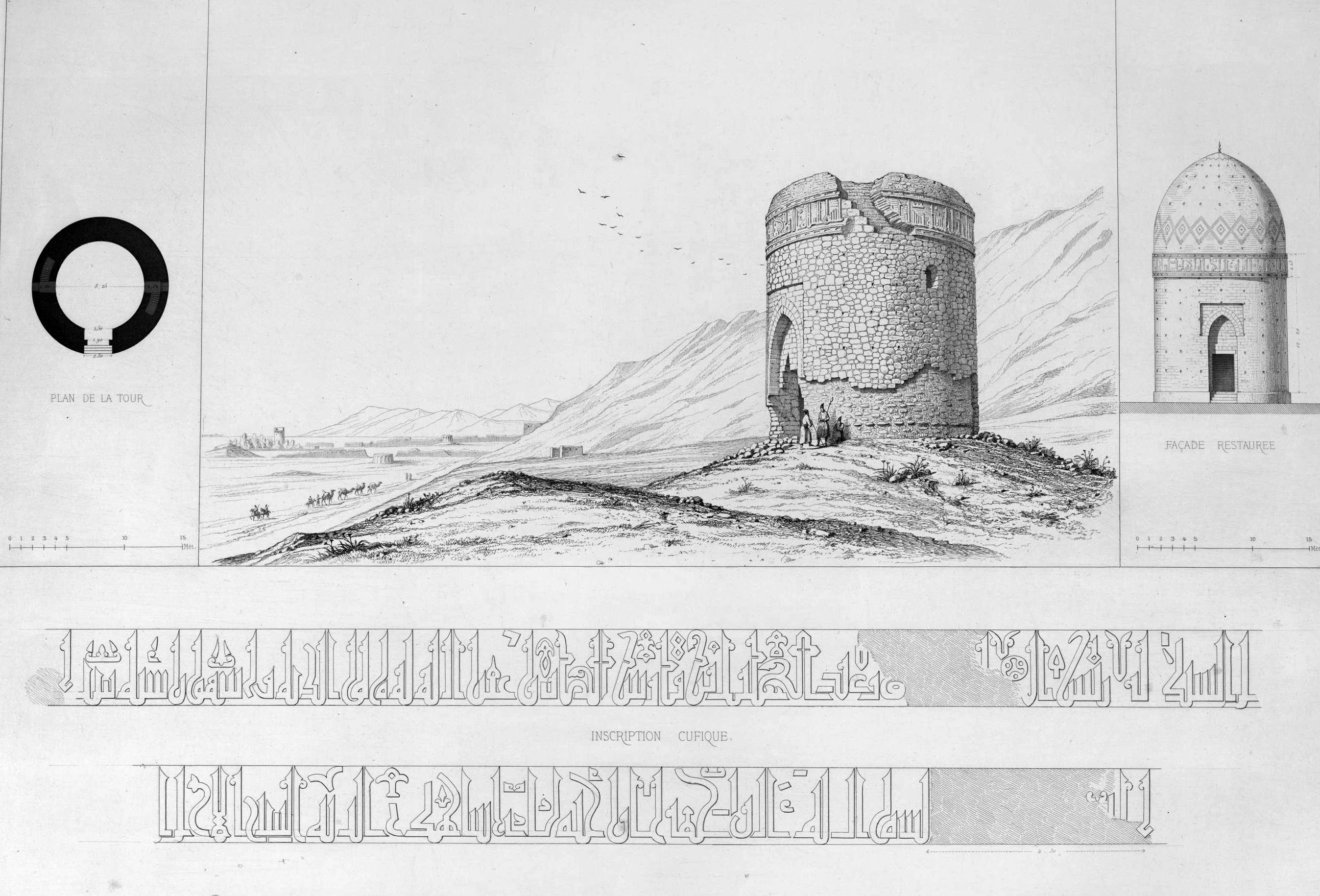
Details of the tower built of stone (Fakhroldoleh Dome), Ruins of Rei

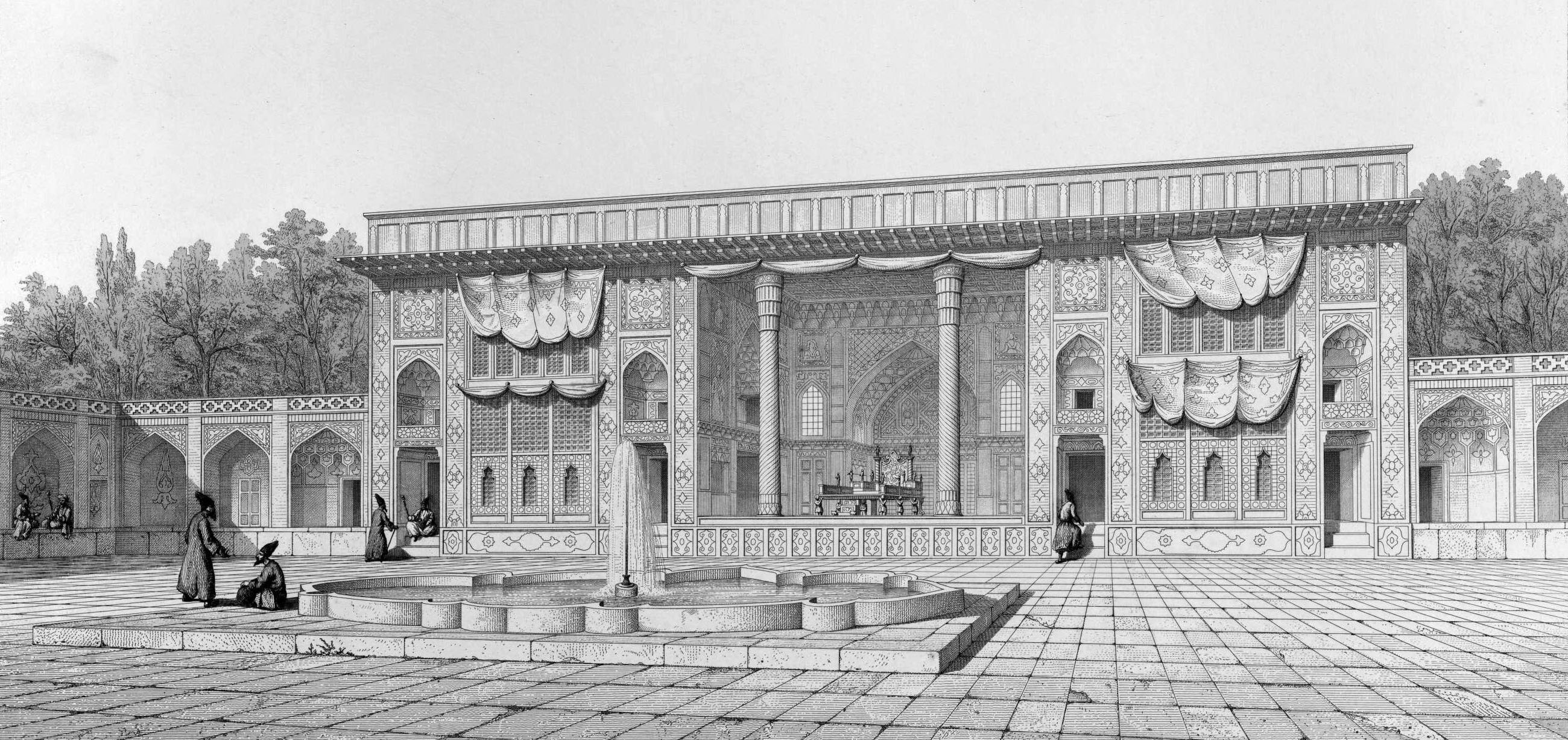
Marble throne, Golestan palace

== Qom; Tegarood; Kashan ==
=== Eugène Flandin ===
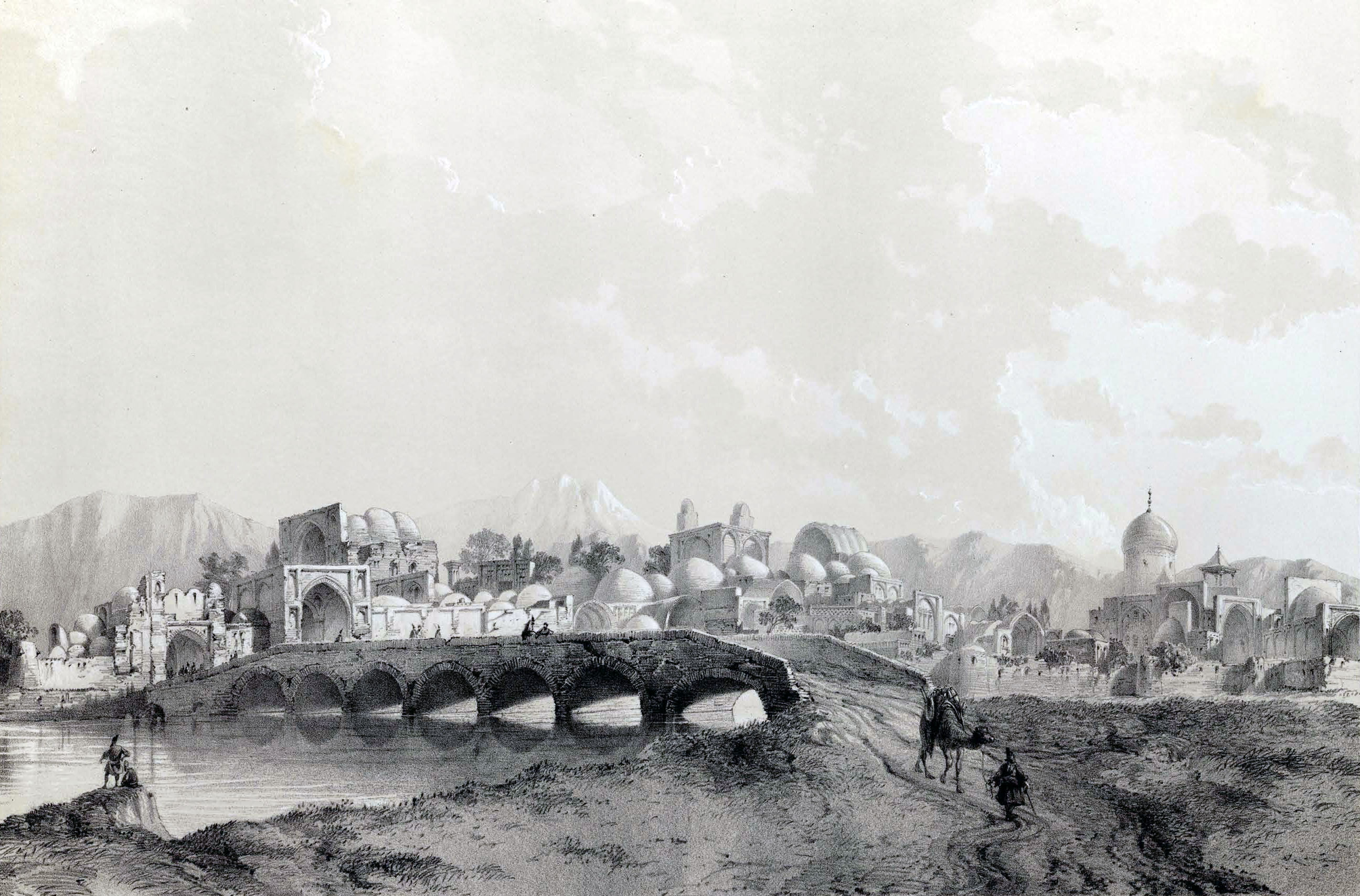
View of the bridge and the city of Qom

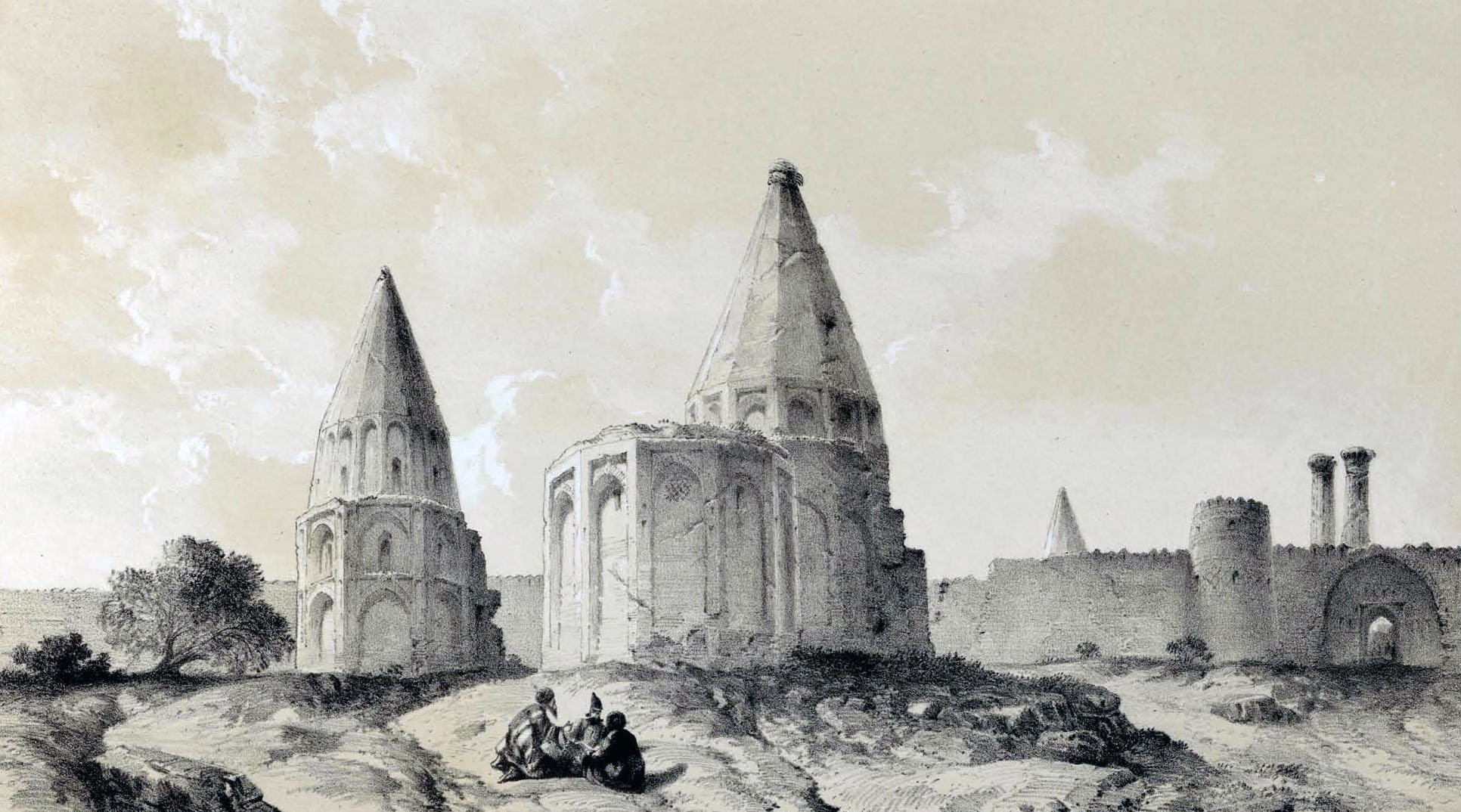
Tombs Qom

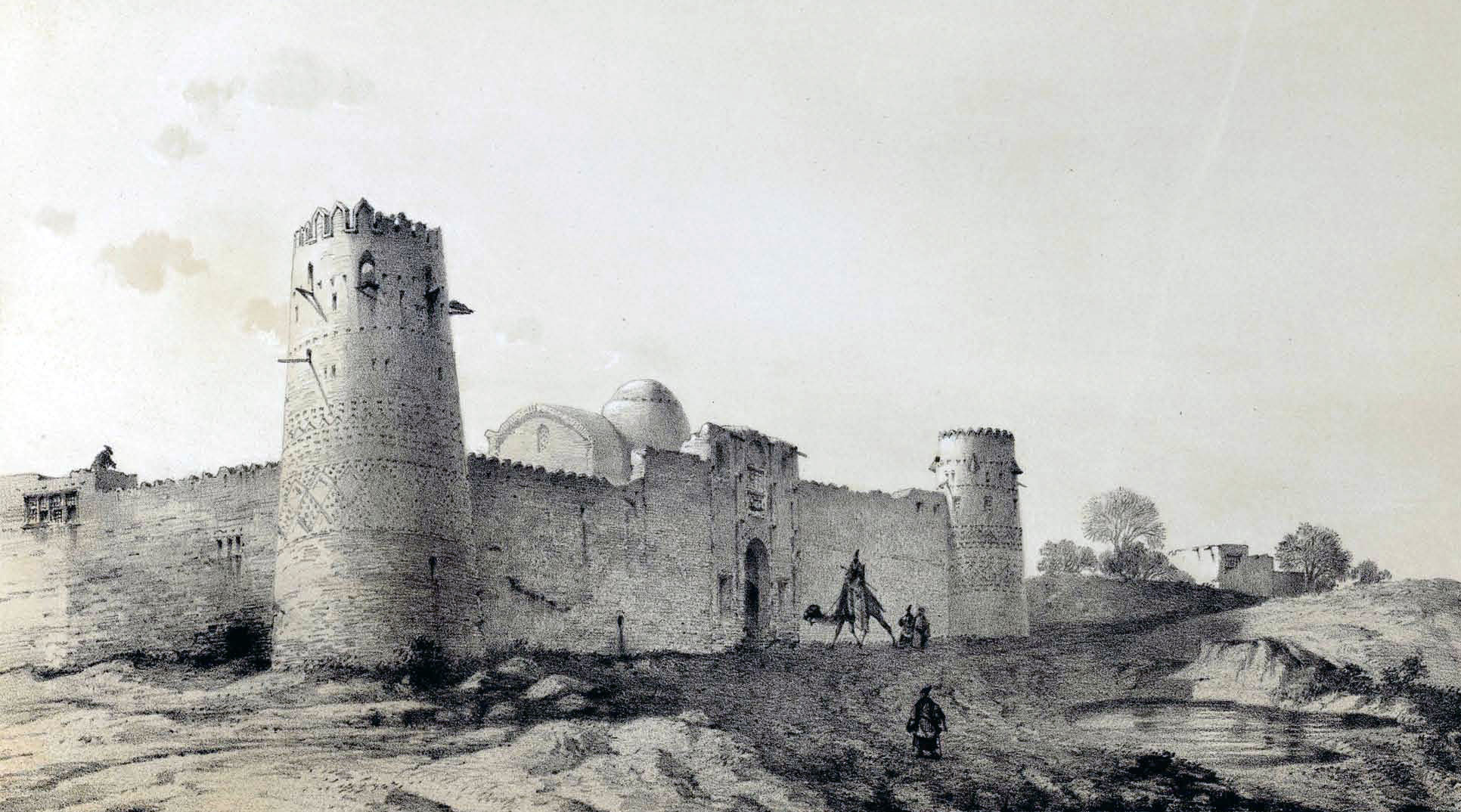
Fortified village Tagharood

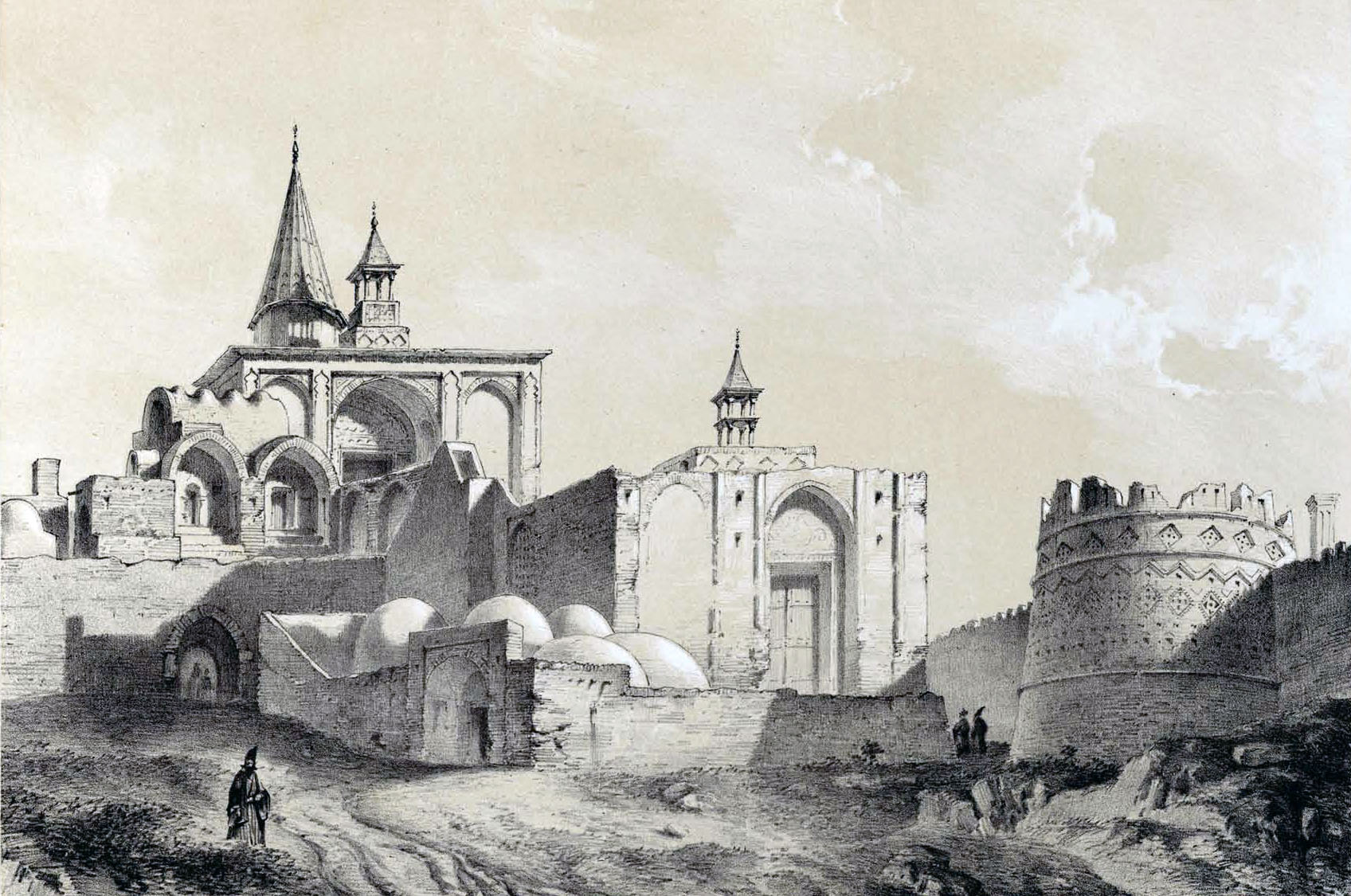
Imam Zadeh (tomb) in Kashan

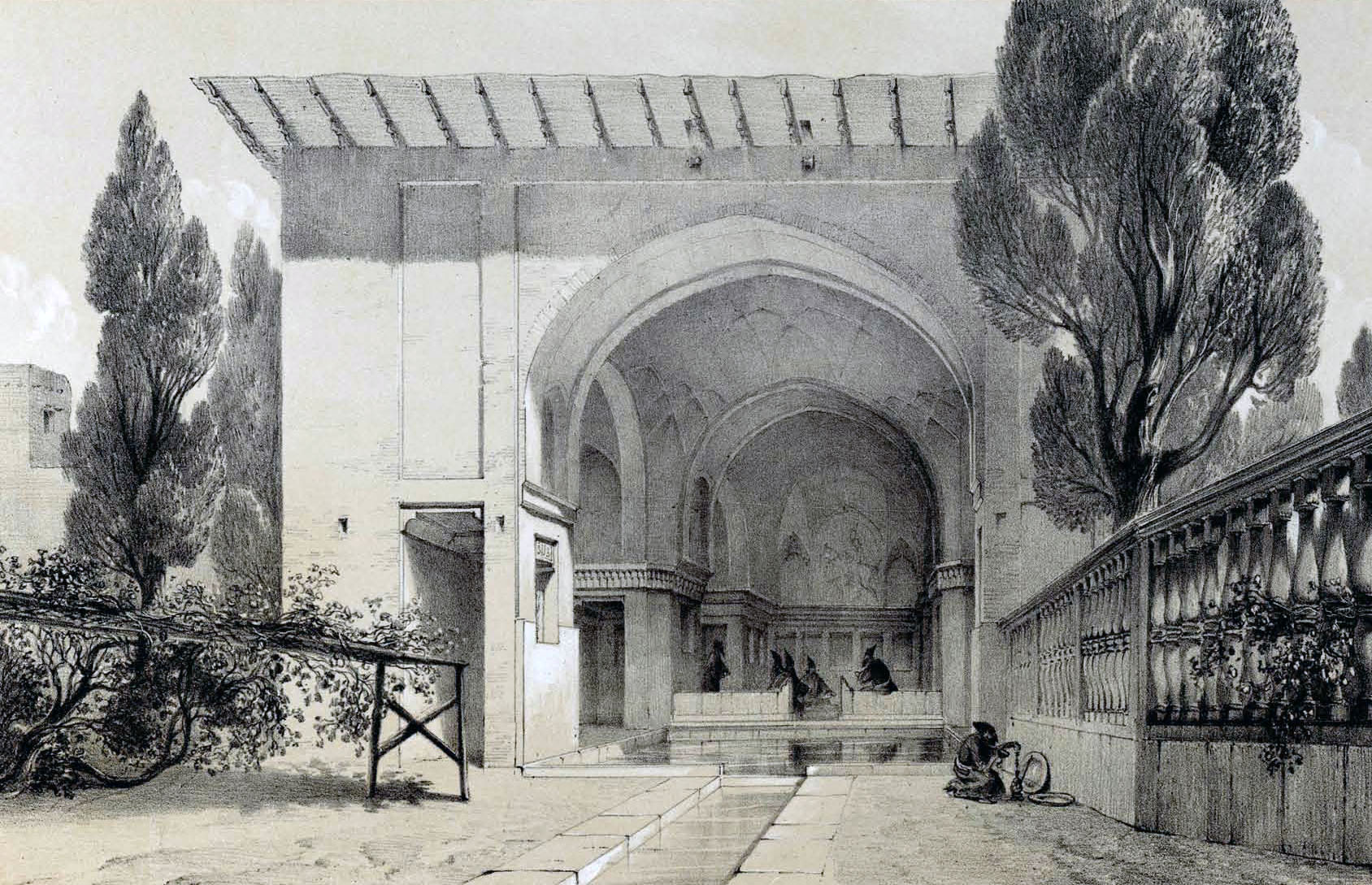
Kiosk Fin-Fin, near Kashan

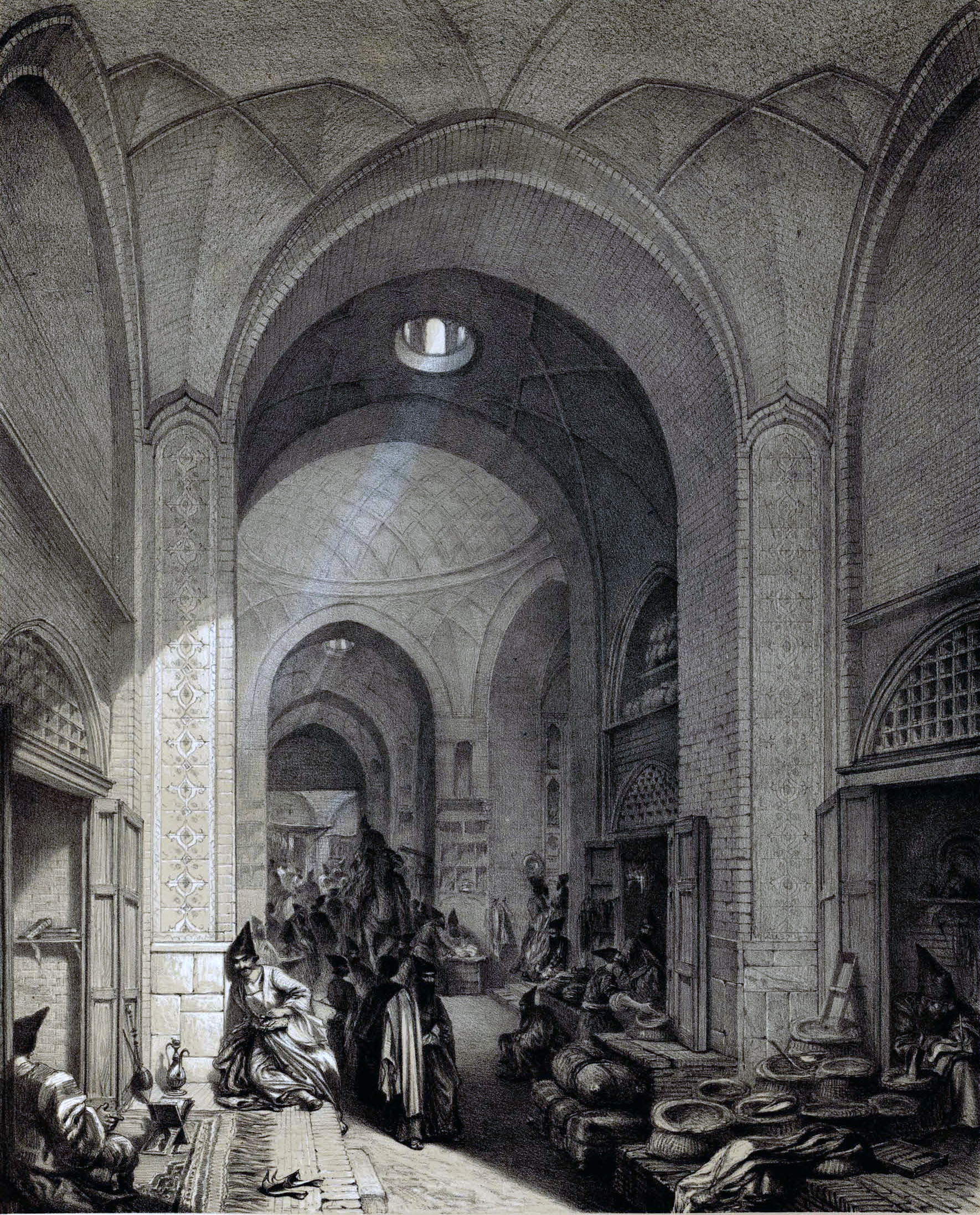
Kashan Bazaar

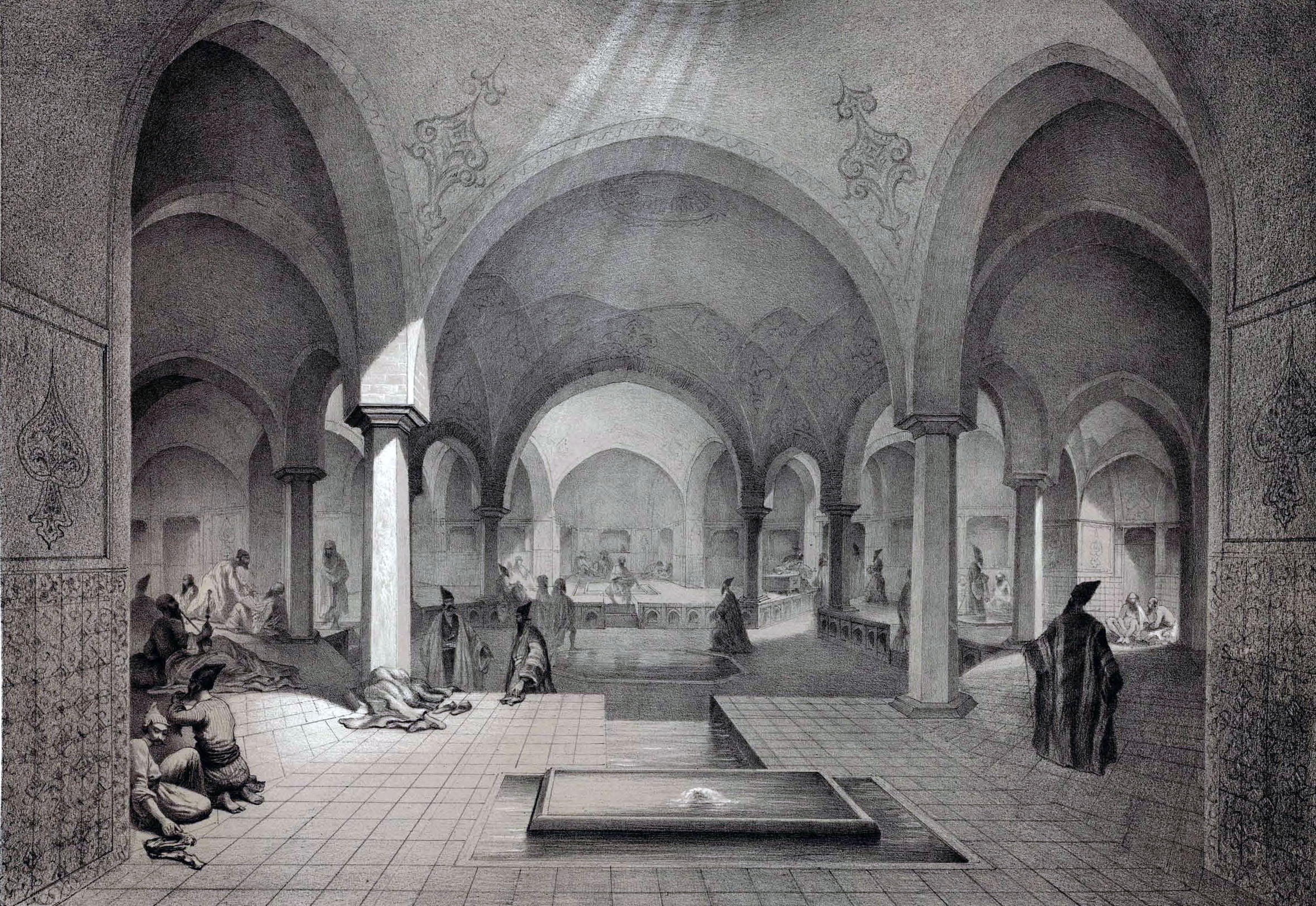
Interior bath (Khan) Kashan

=== Pascal Coste ===
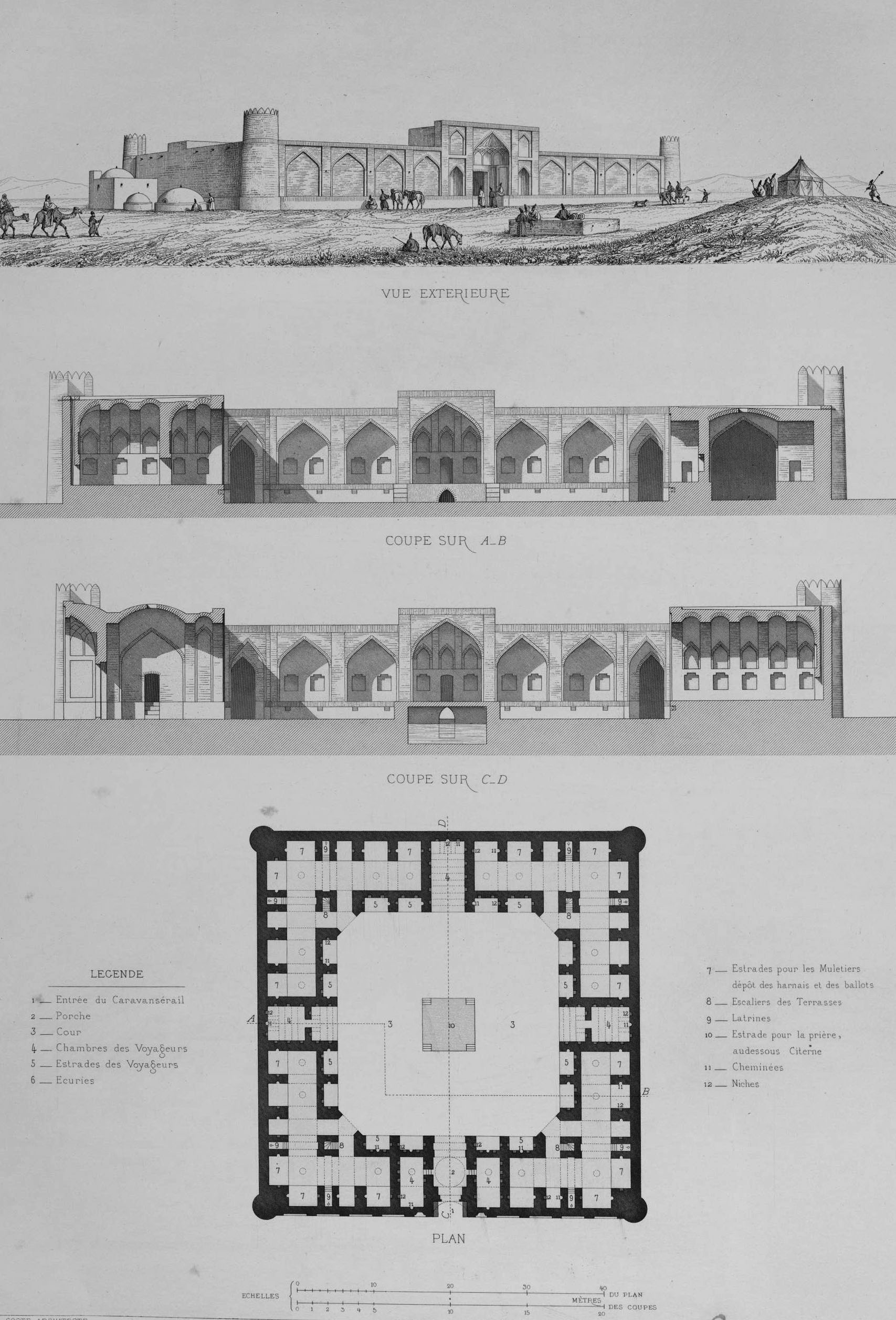
Pasangan caravanserai on the road from Tehran to Isfahan

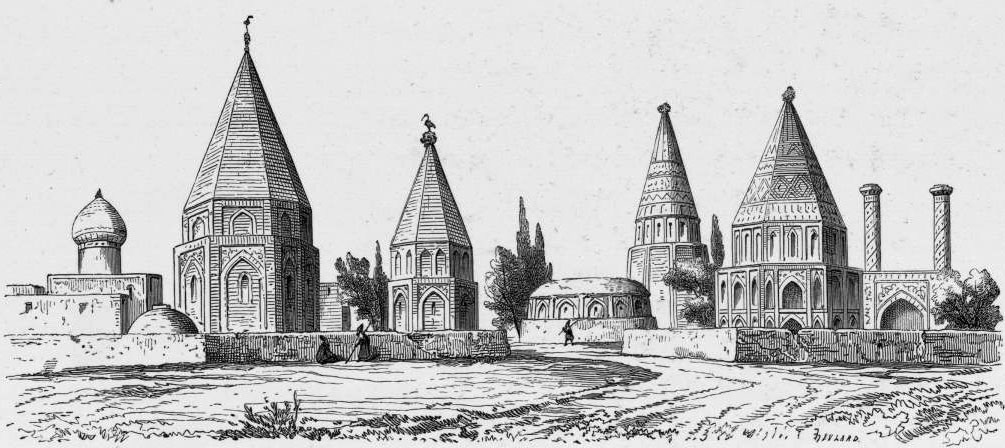
Tombeuax of Qom

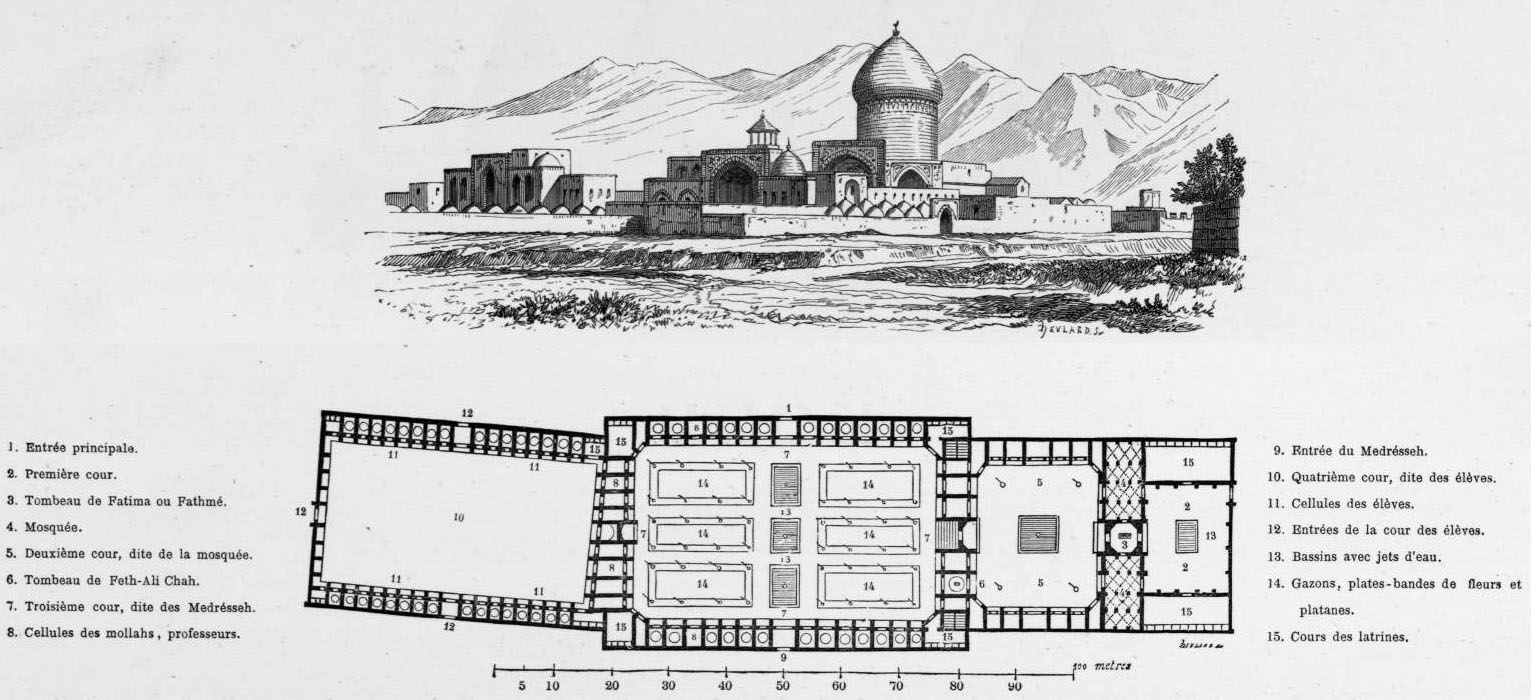
The mosque of Qom (Fatima Masumeh Shrine)

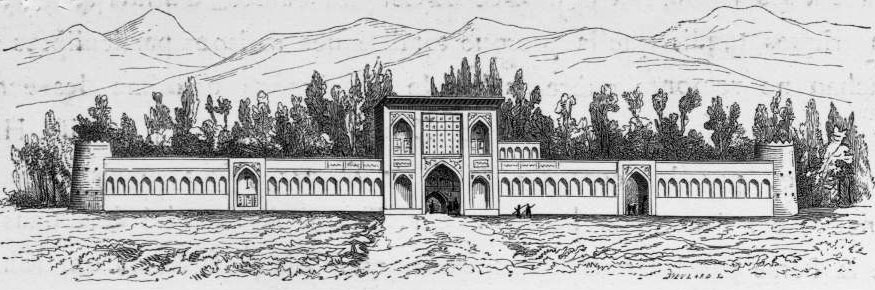
Kiosque Bagh Shah Fin

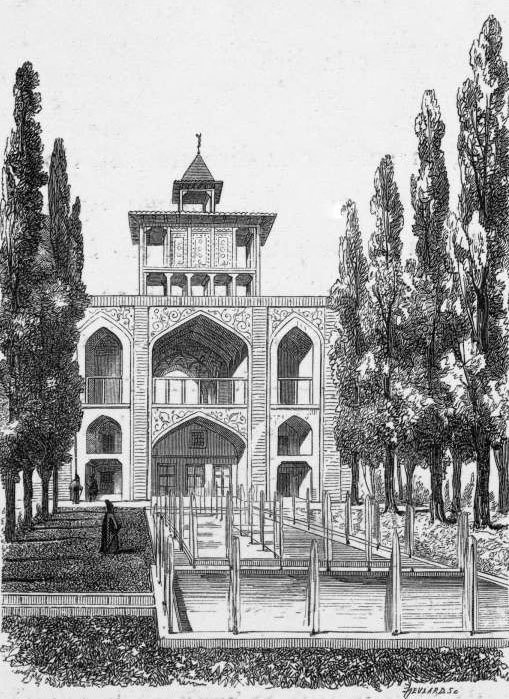
Residence Royal Bagh Shah Fin

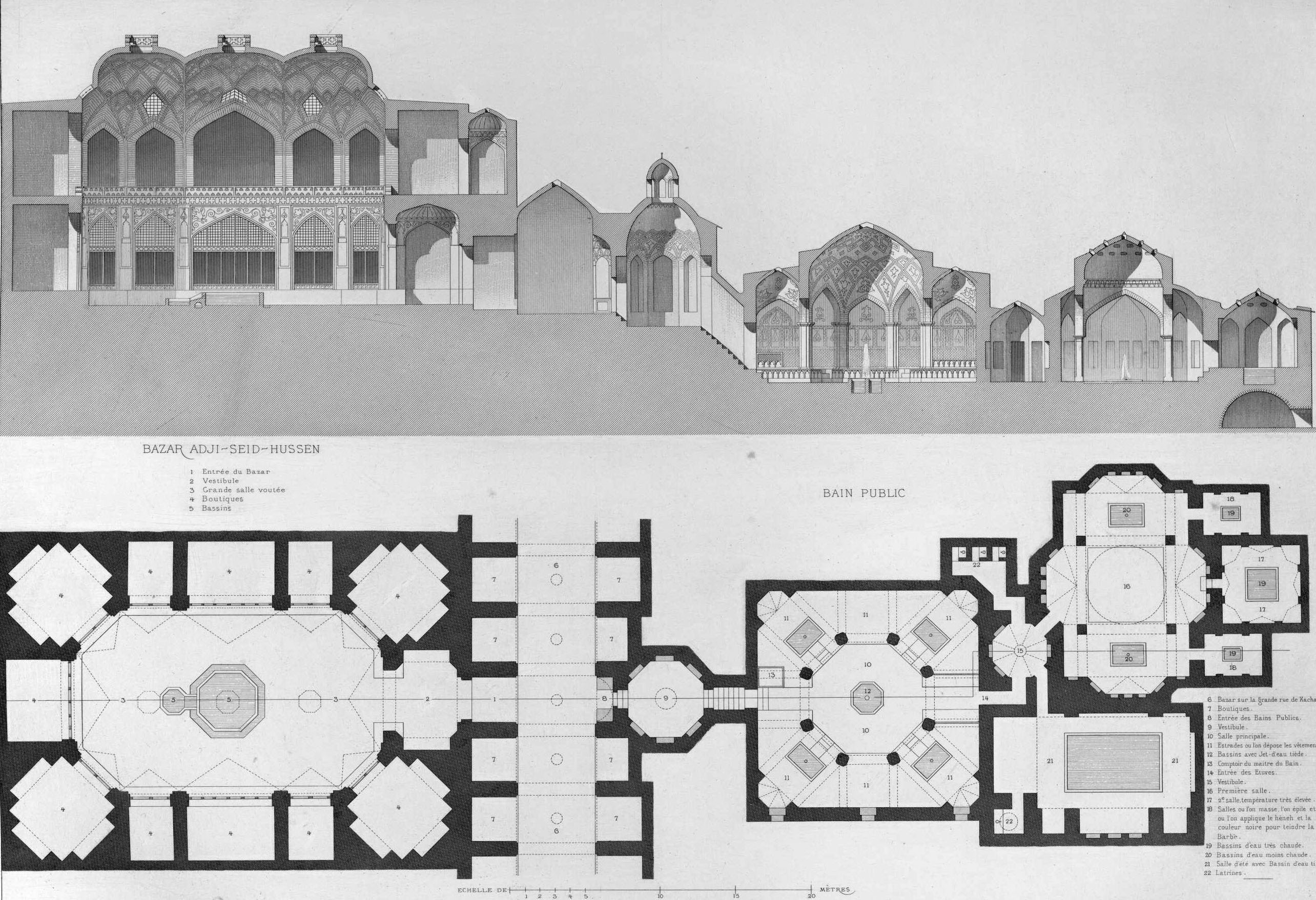
Plates on Haji Seid Hussein Bazar and bathhouse, Kashan

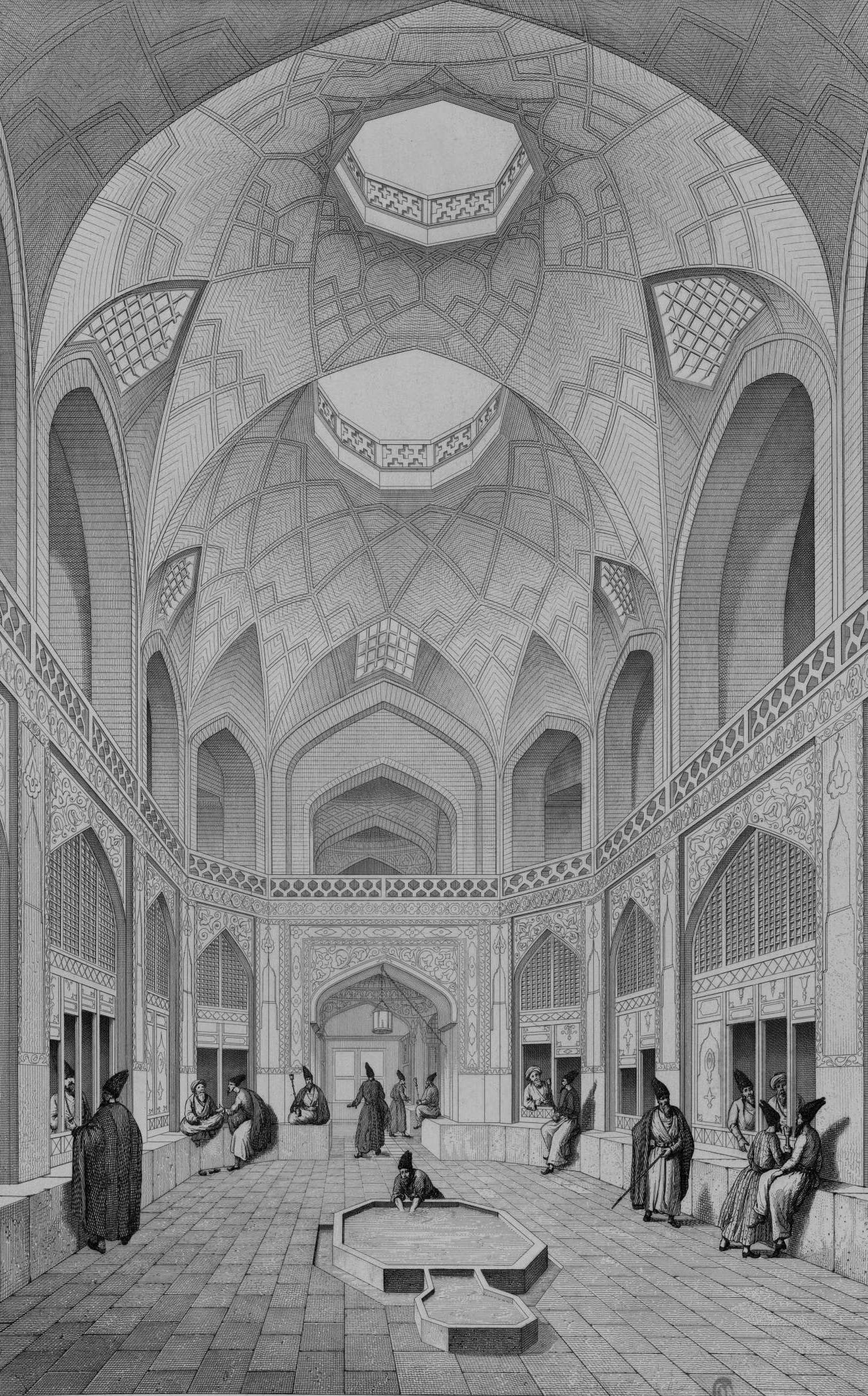
Bazar Haji Seid Hussein Kashan

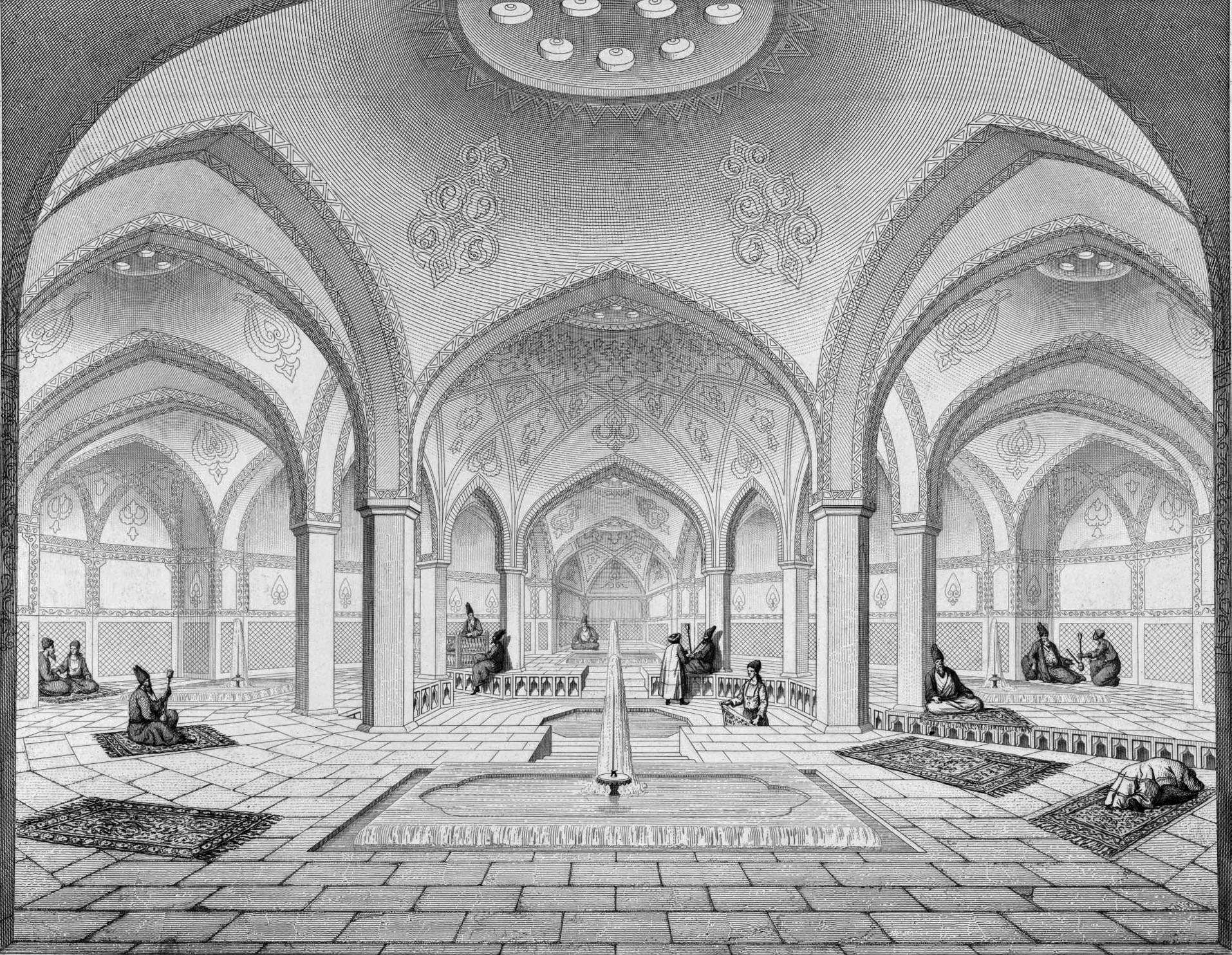
Bathhouse (Khan), Kashan

== Isfahan ==
=== Eugène Flandin ===
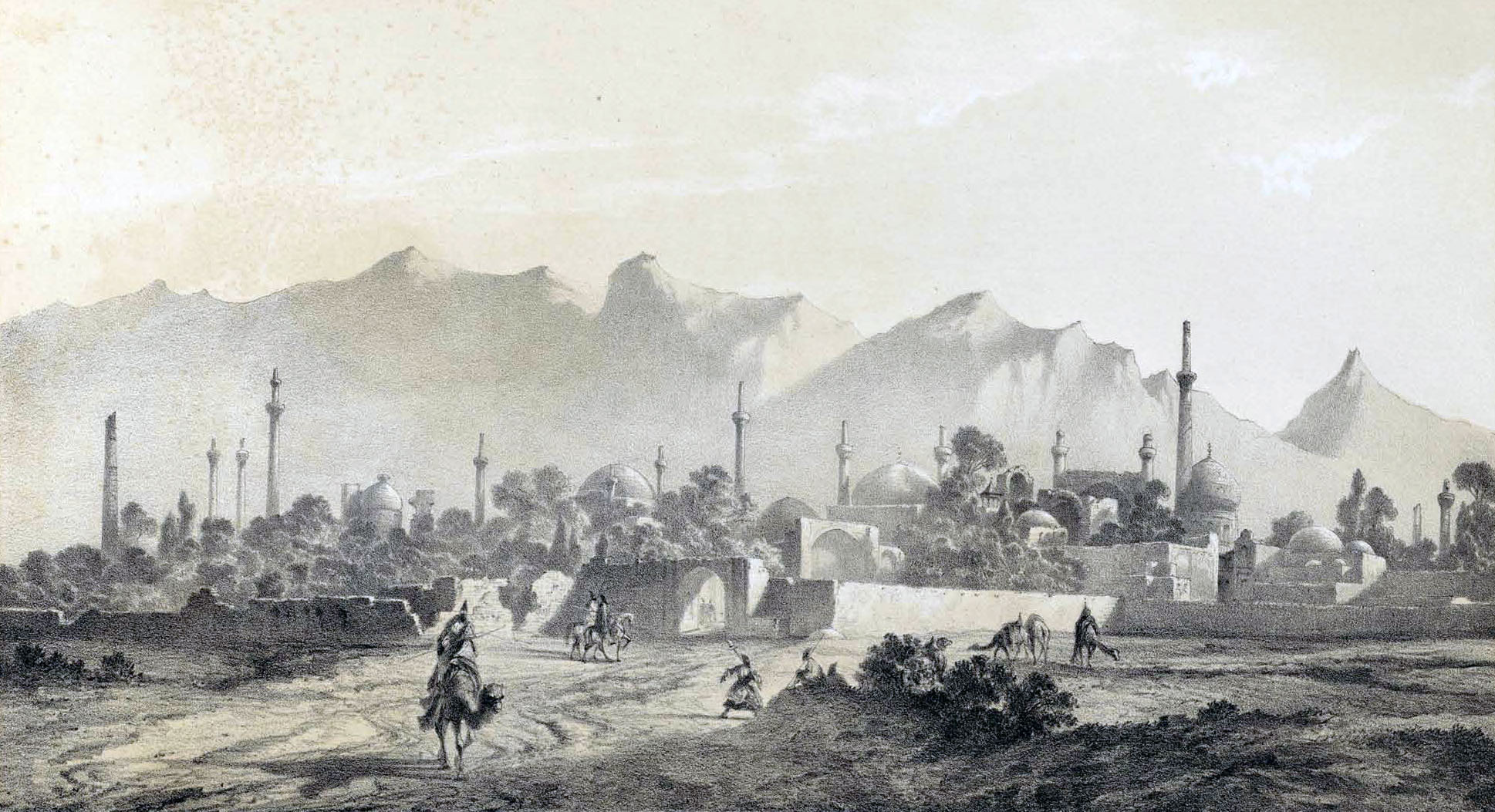
Isfahan to the north side

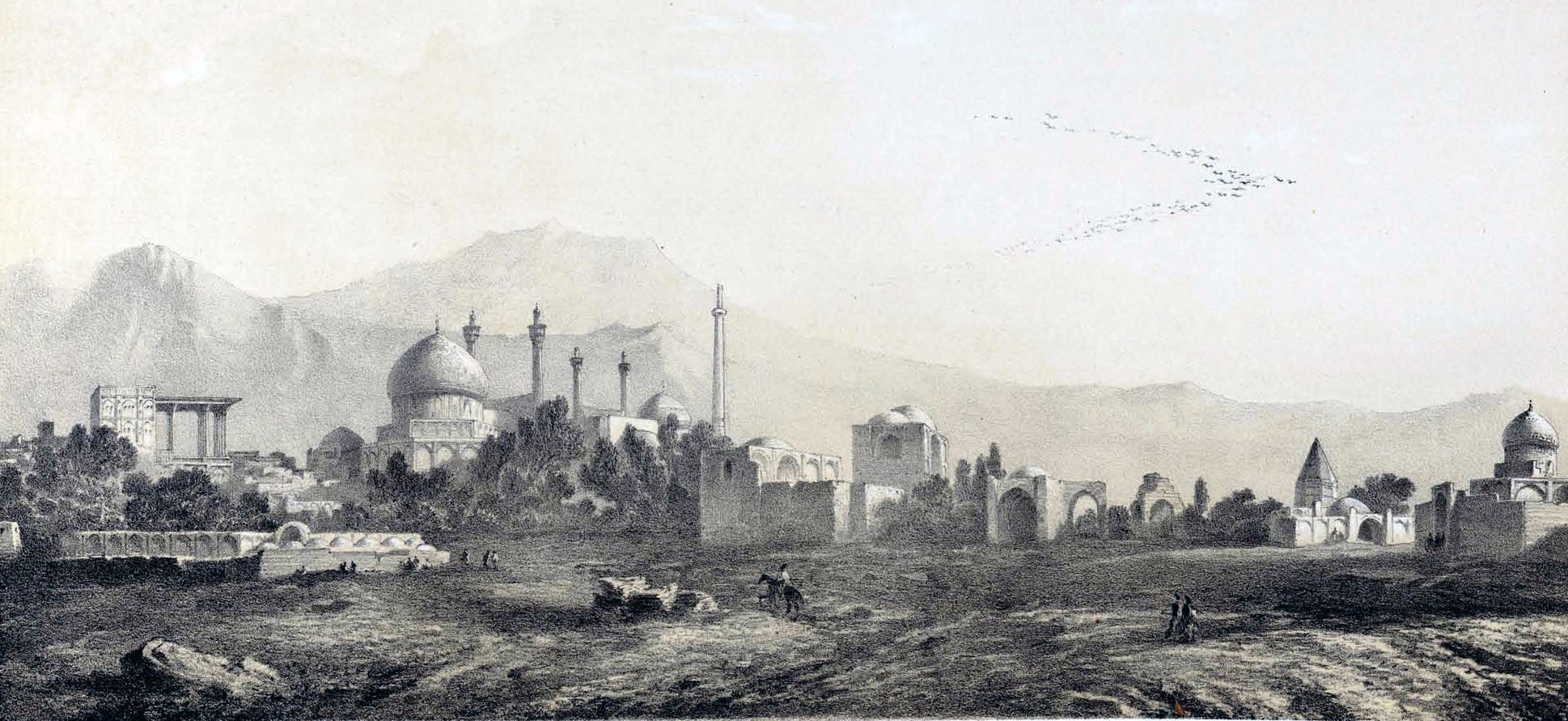
Isfahan to the south side

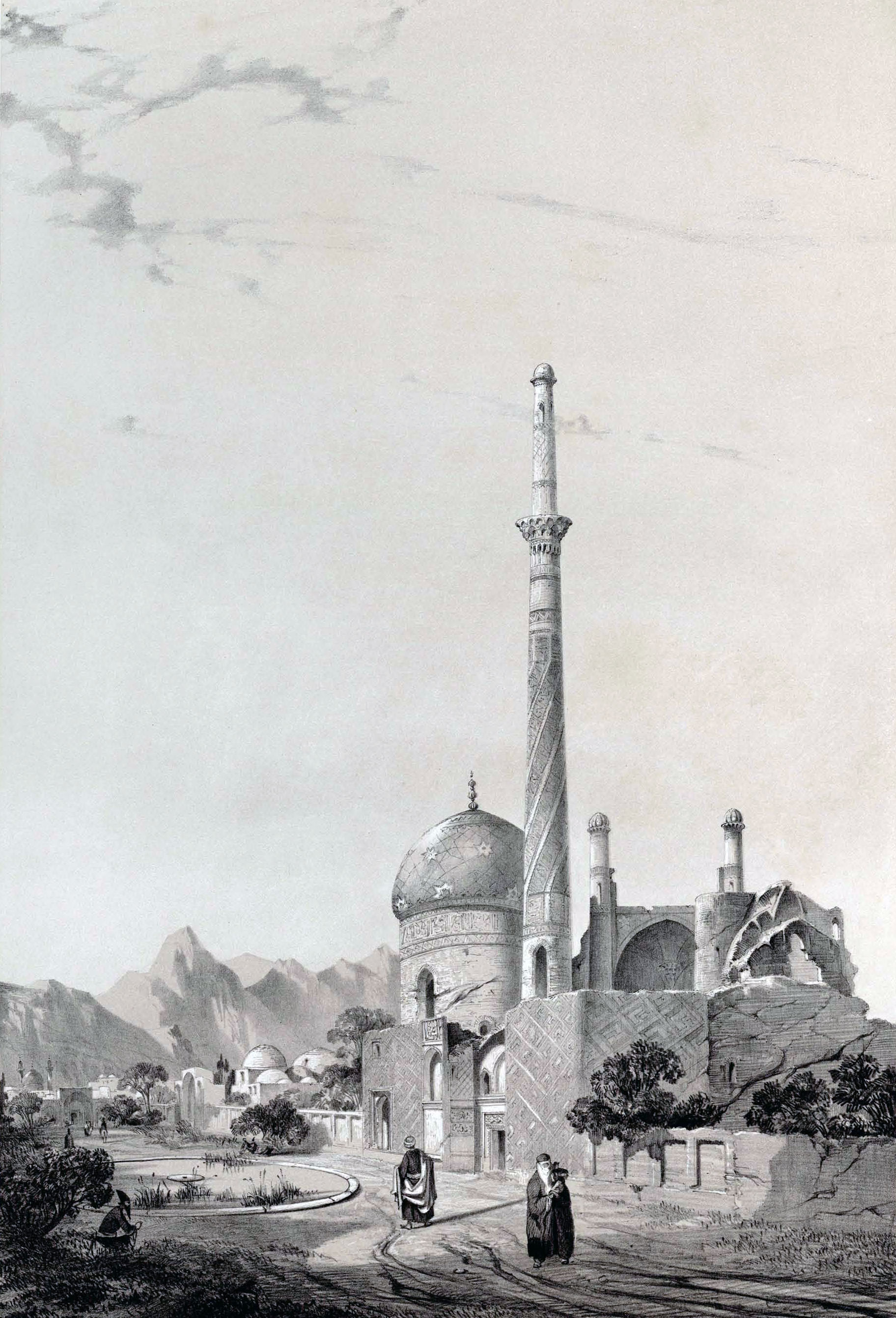
Baba Sukhte Mosque (Bagh-e-Ghoushkhane minaret), Isfahan

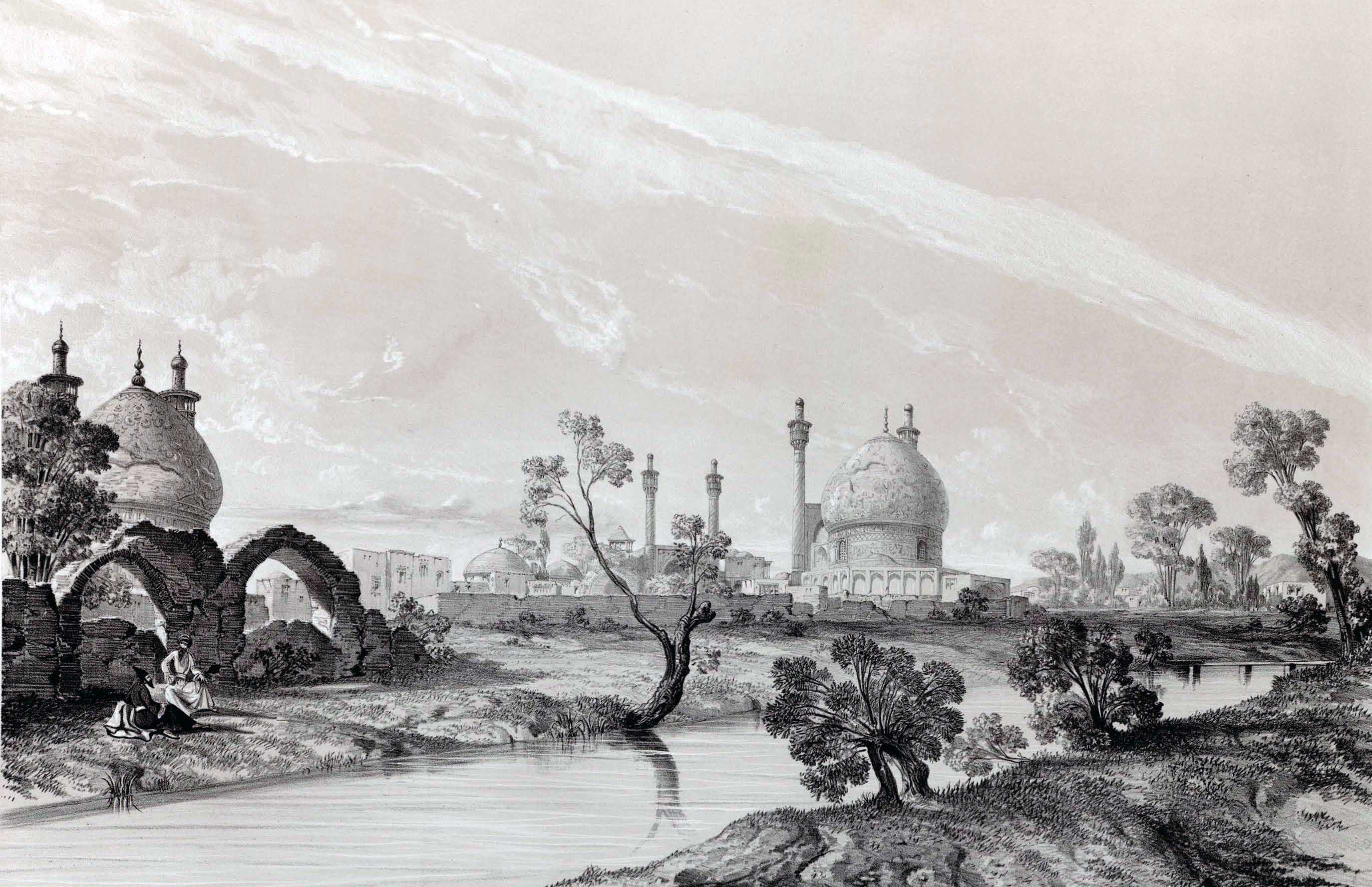
Shah Mosque, Isfahan

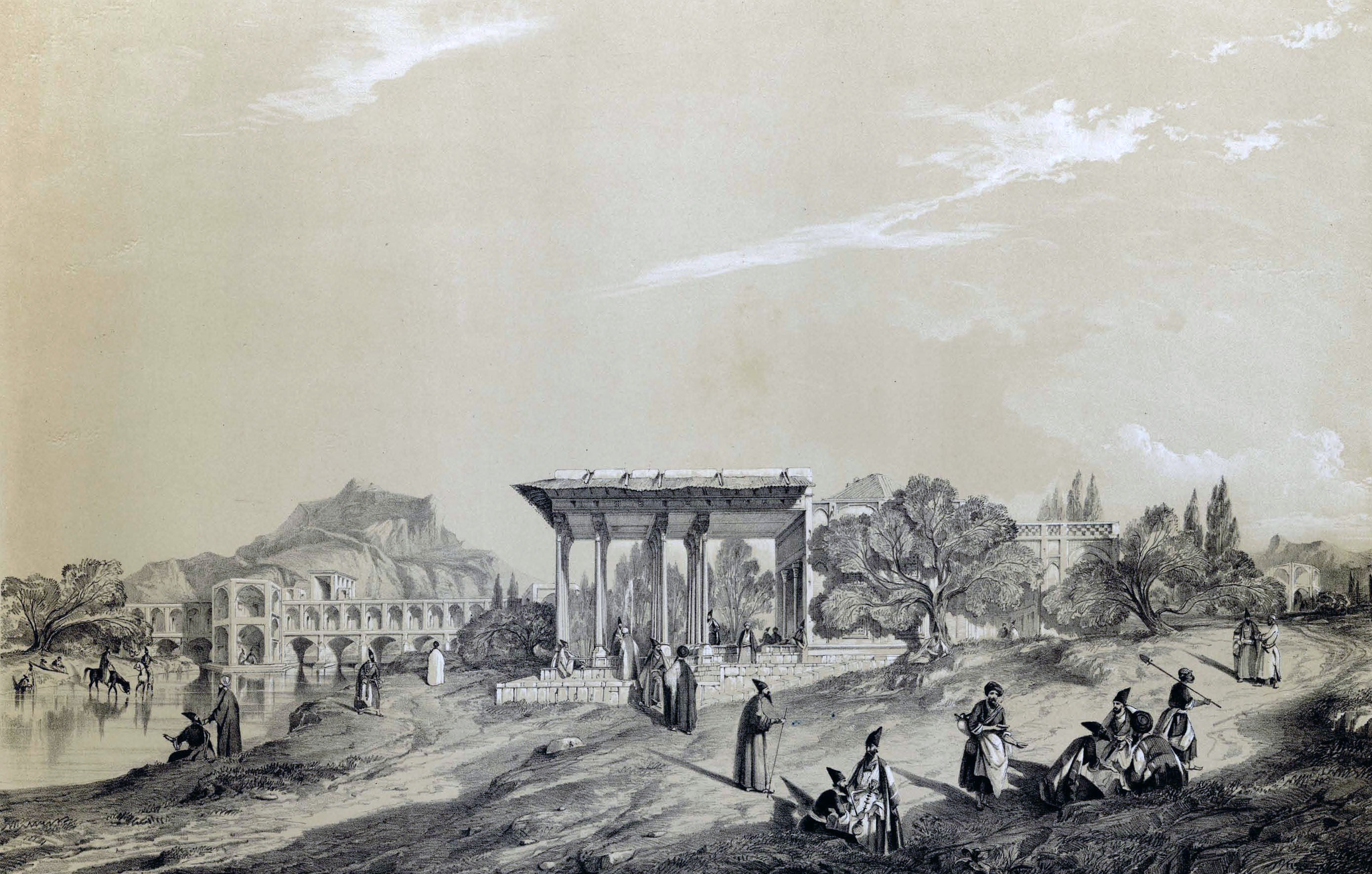
Kiosk Mirrors [House], Isfahan

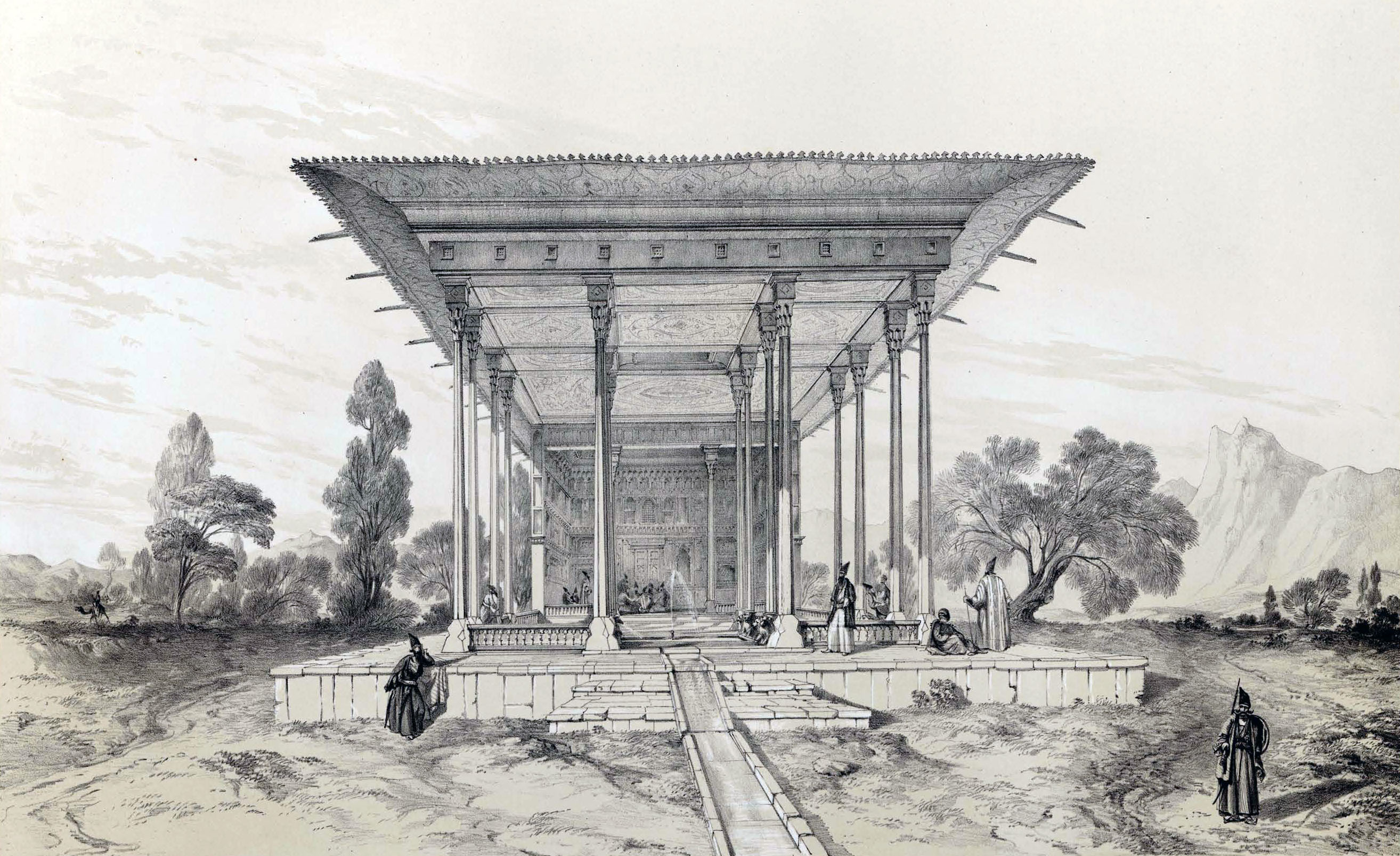
Kiosk Mirrors [House], Isfahan

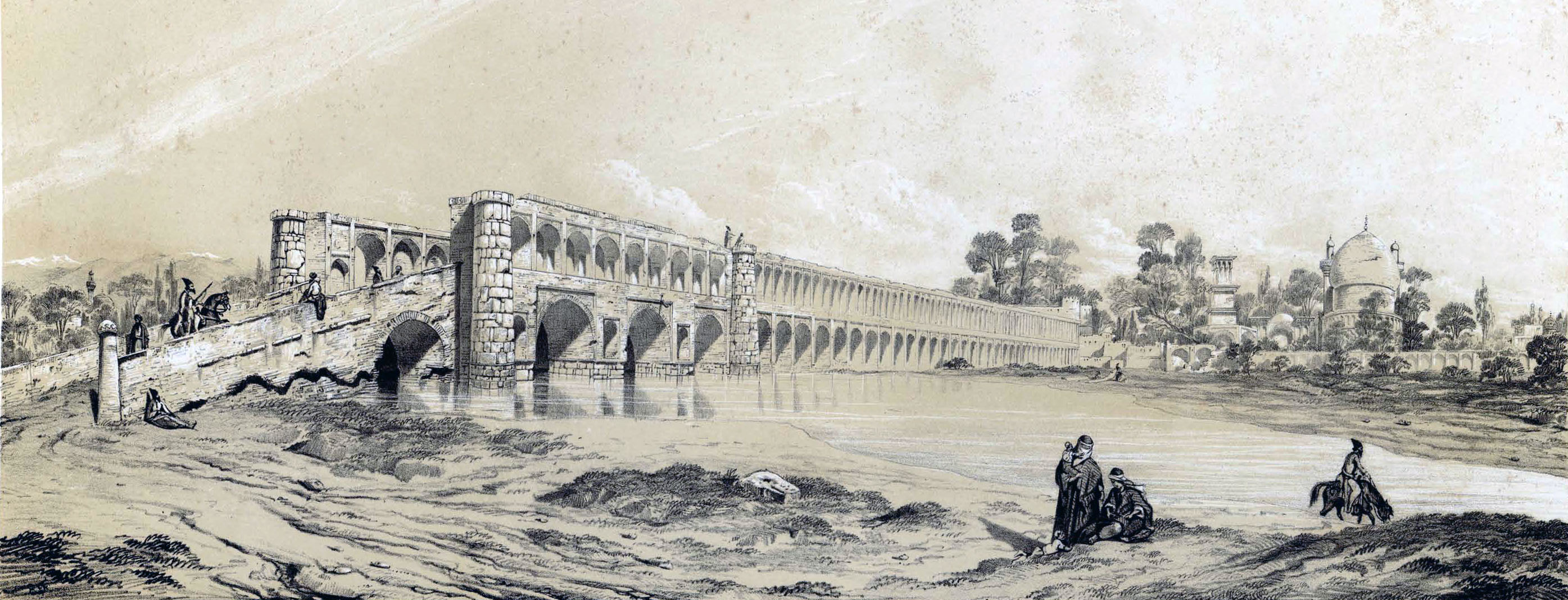
Bridge of Julfa (Siosepol), Isfahan

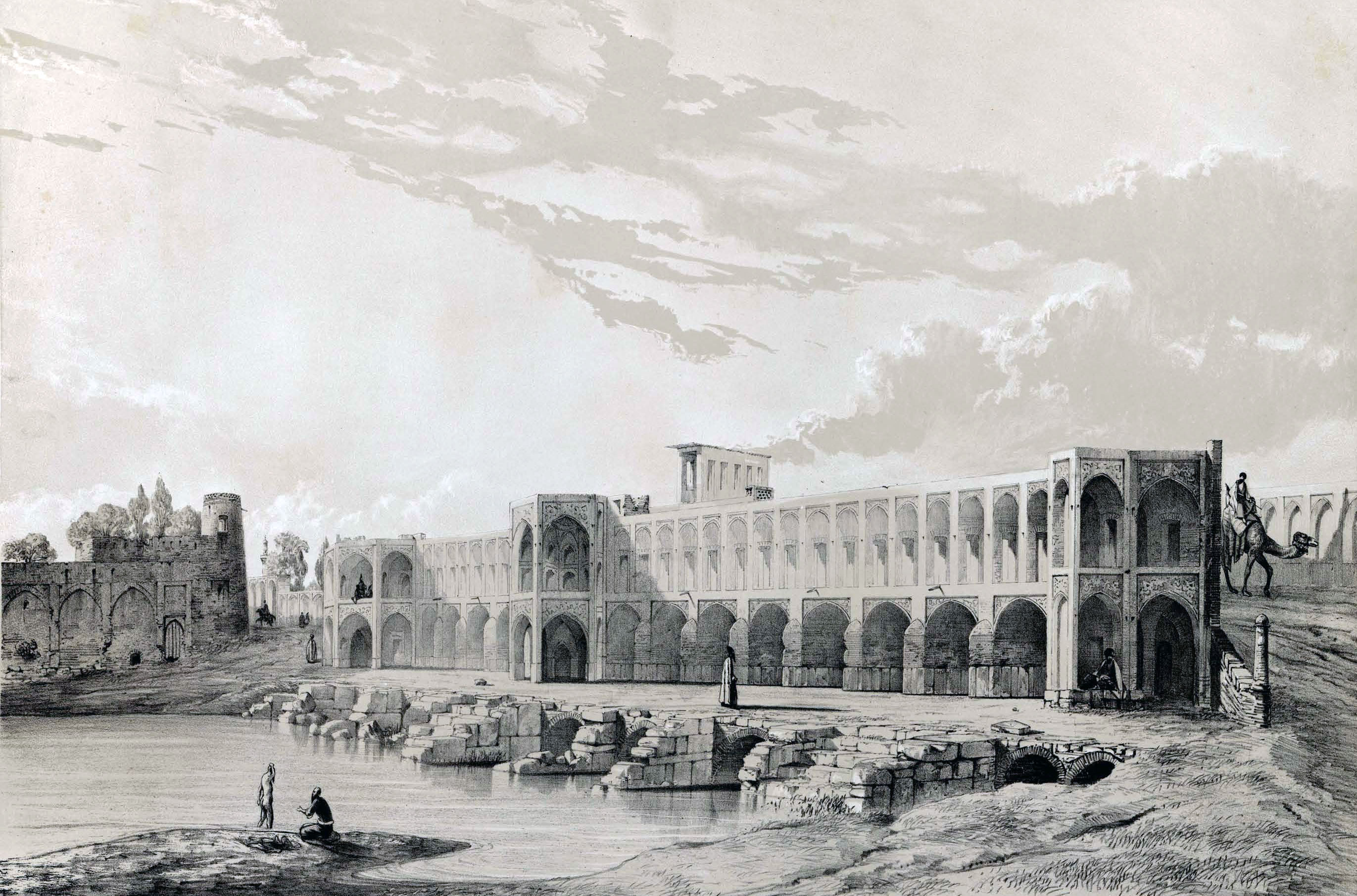
Khaju Bridge

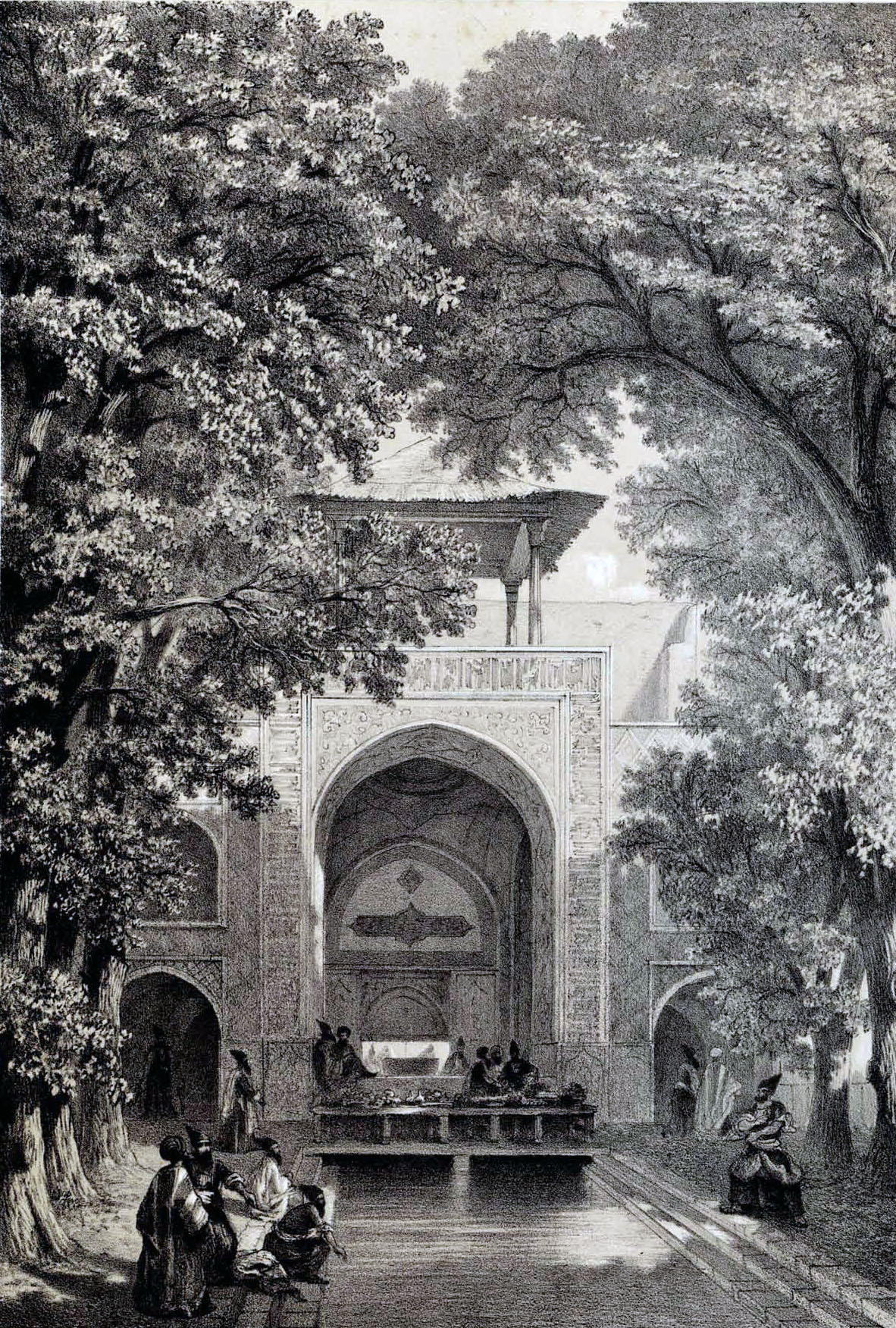
Interior garden of the College of mother of Shah Sultan Hussein, Isfahan

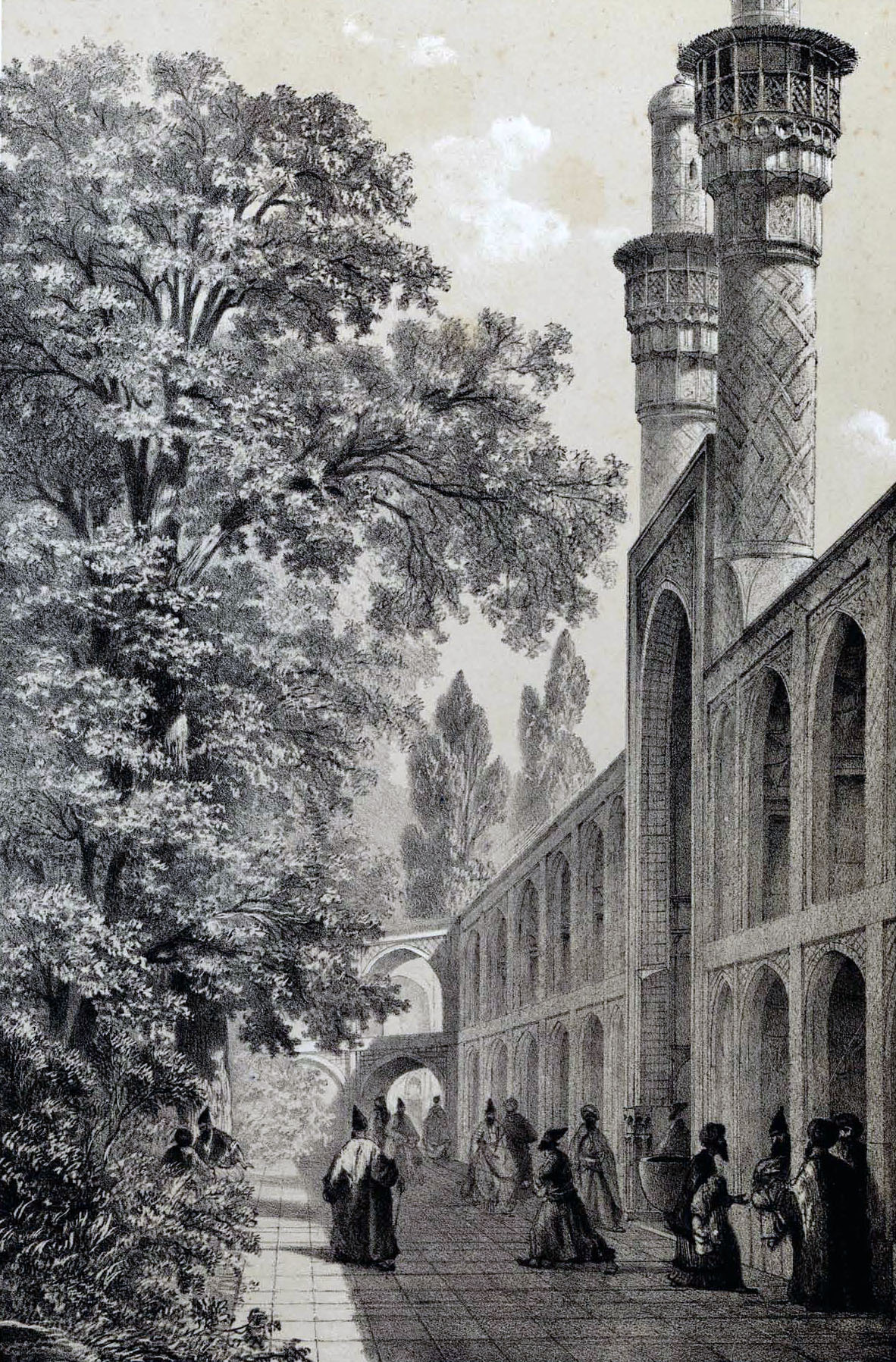
College of mother of Shah Sultan Hussein, Isfahan

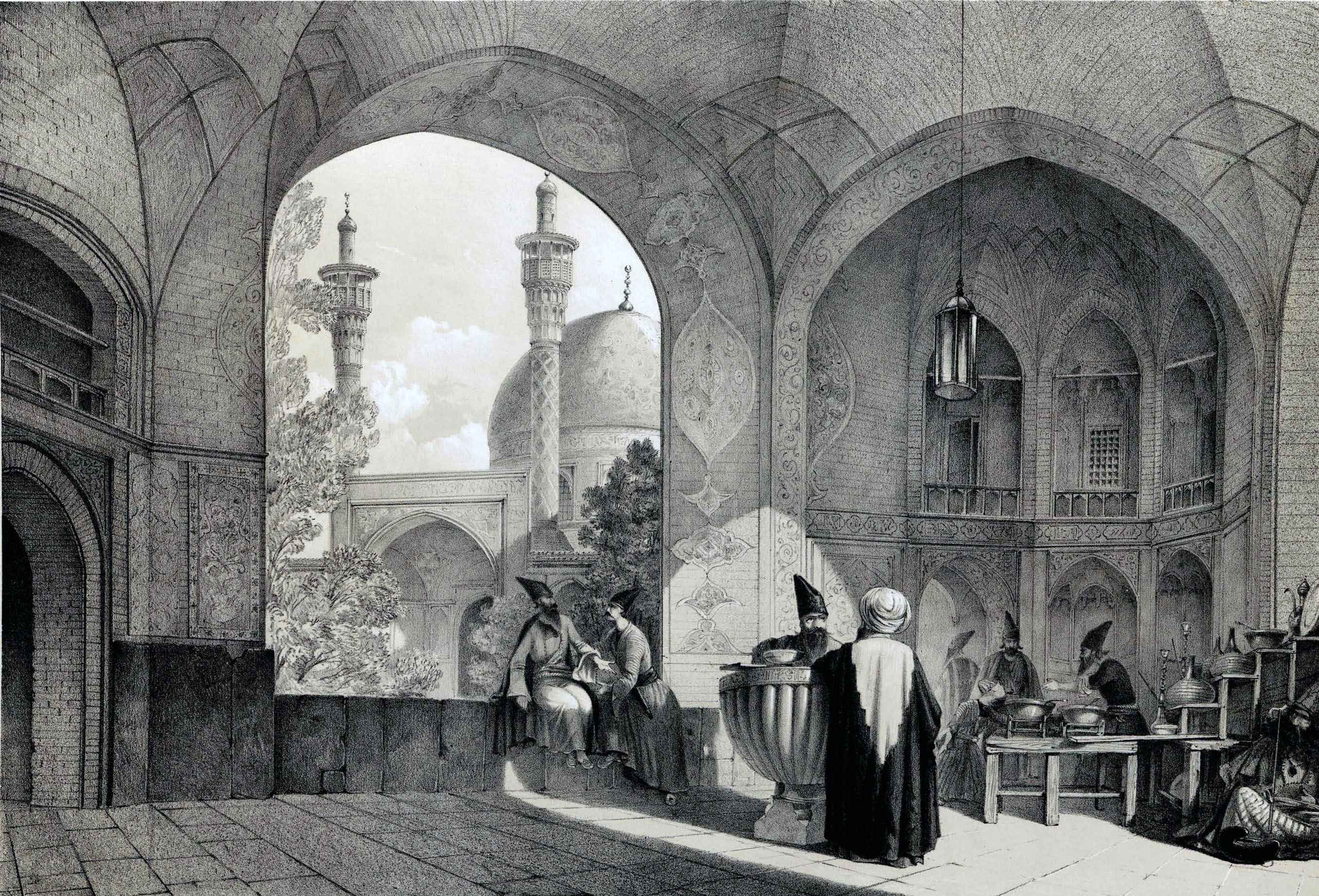
Entrance College of mother of Shah Sultan Hussein, Isfahan

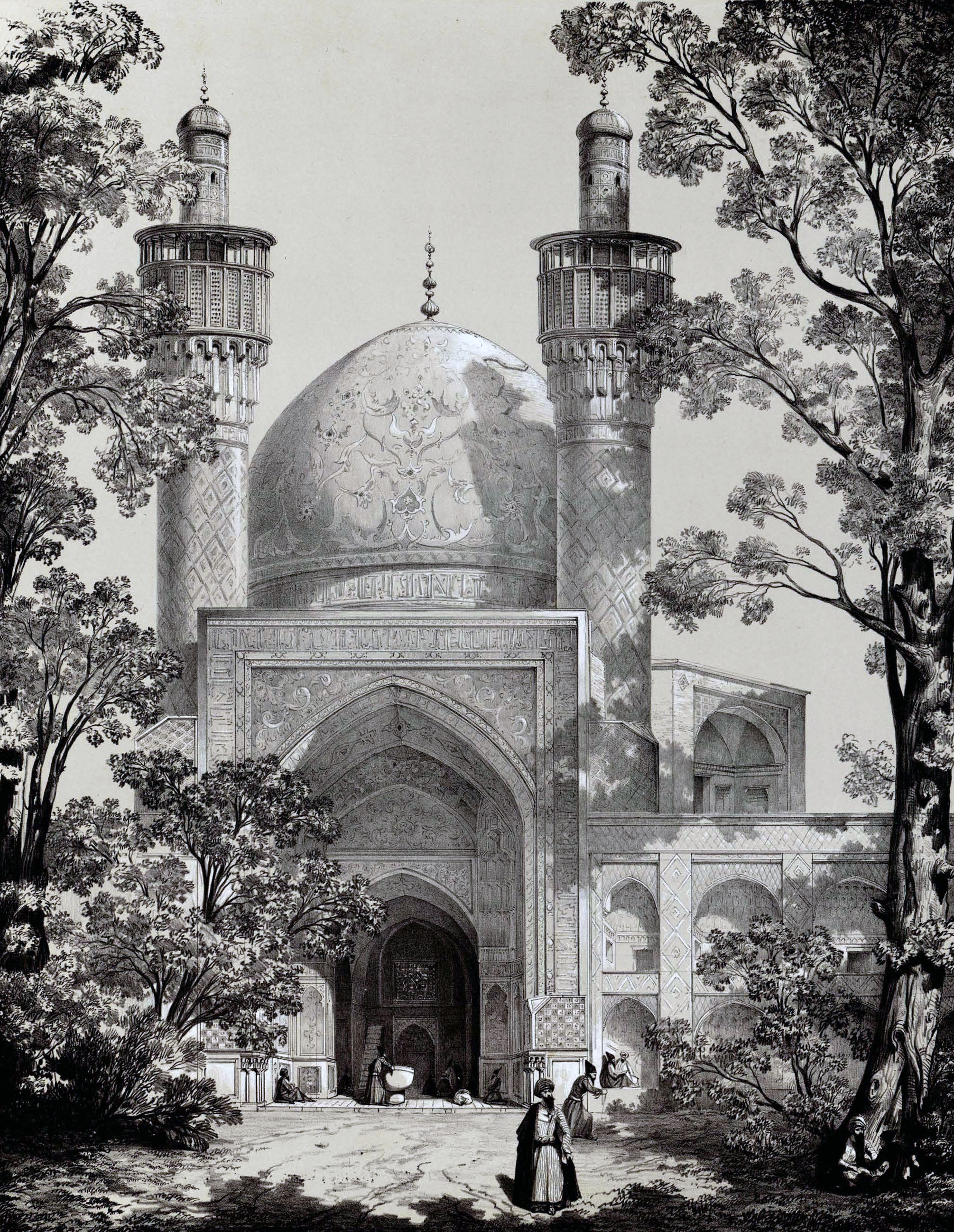
College of mother of Shah Sultan Hussein, Isfahan

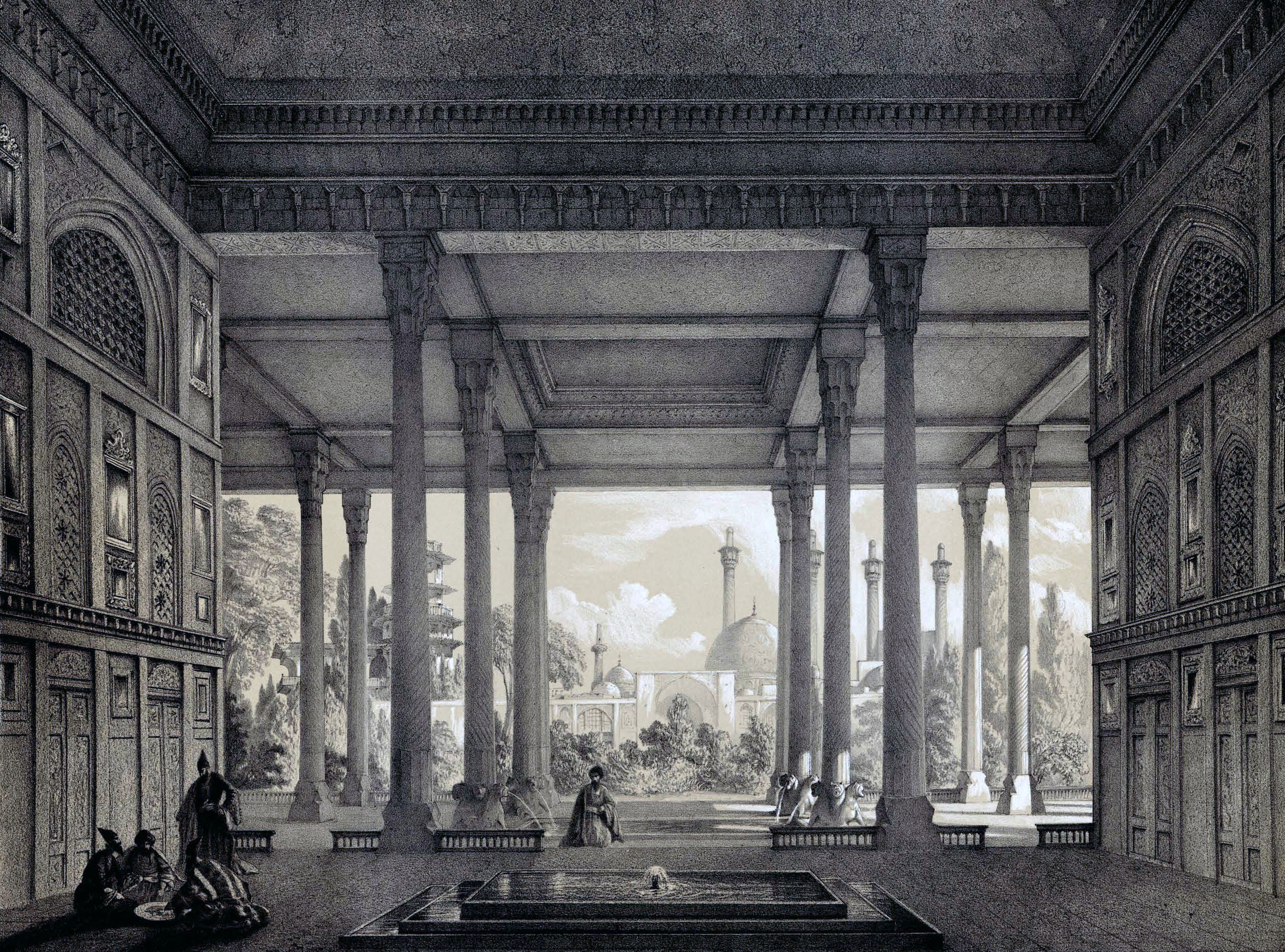
Palace Chehel Sotoun, Isfahan

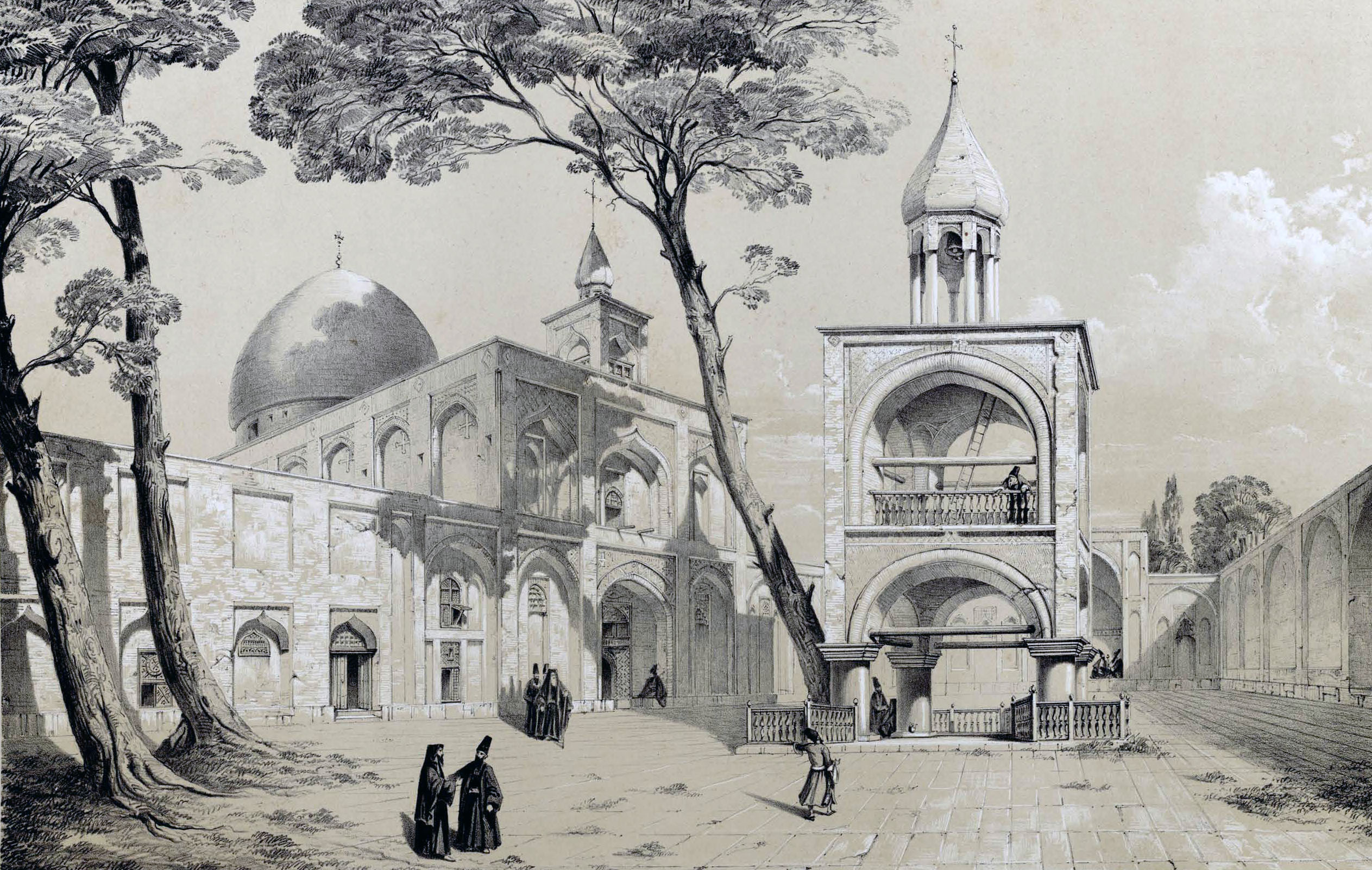
Church of Julfa, Isfahan

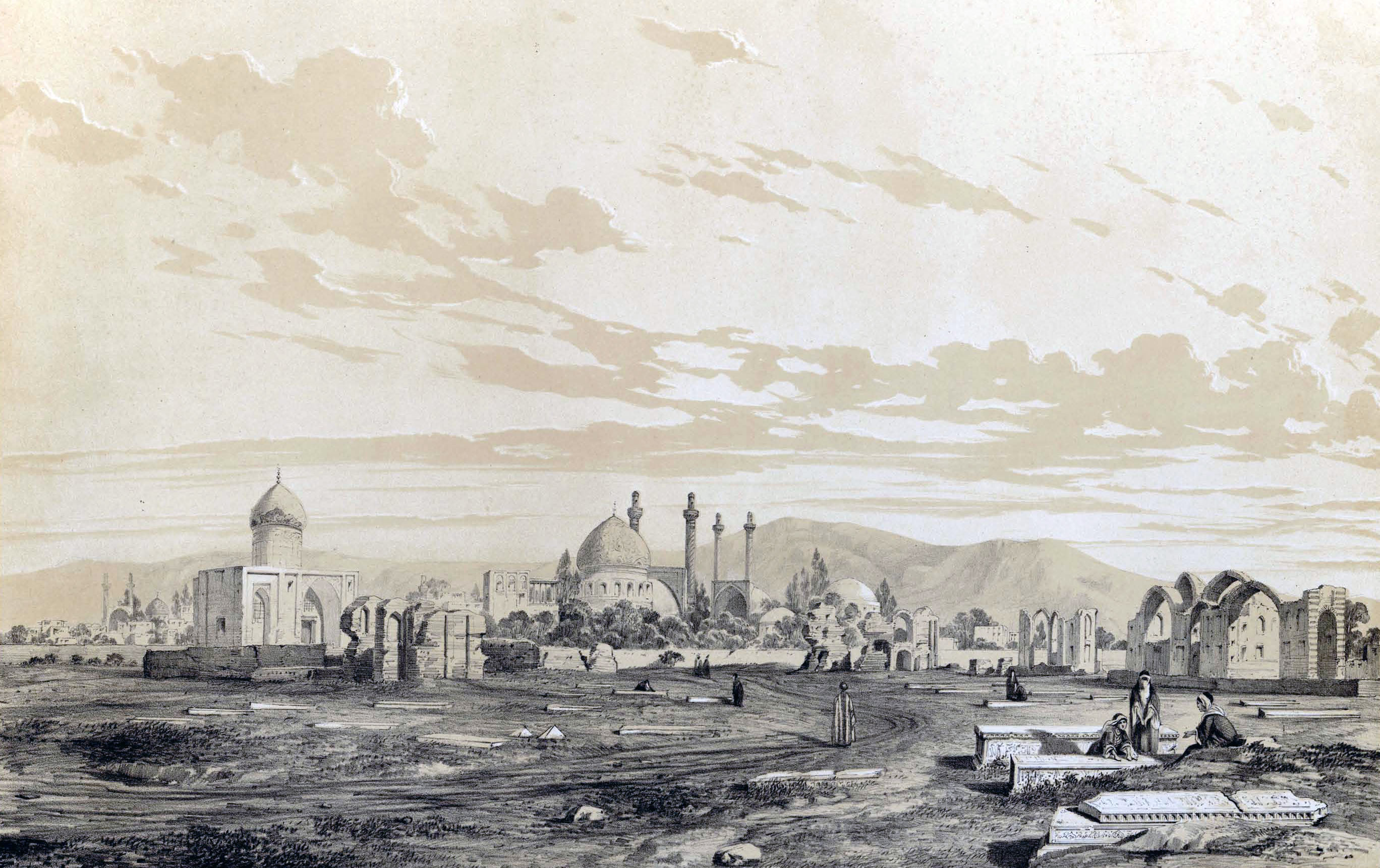
Field of the dead (Takht-e Foulad), Isfahan

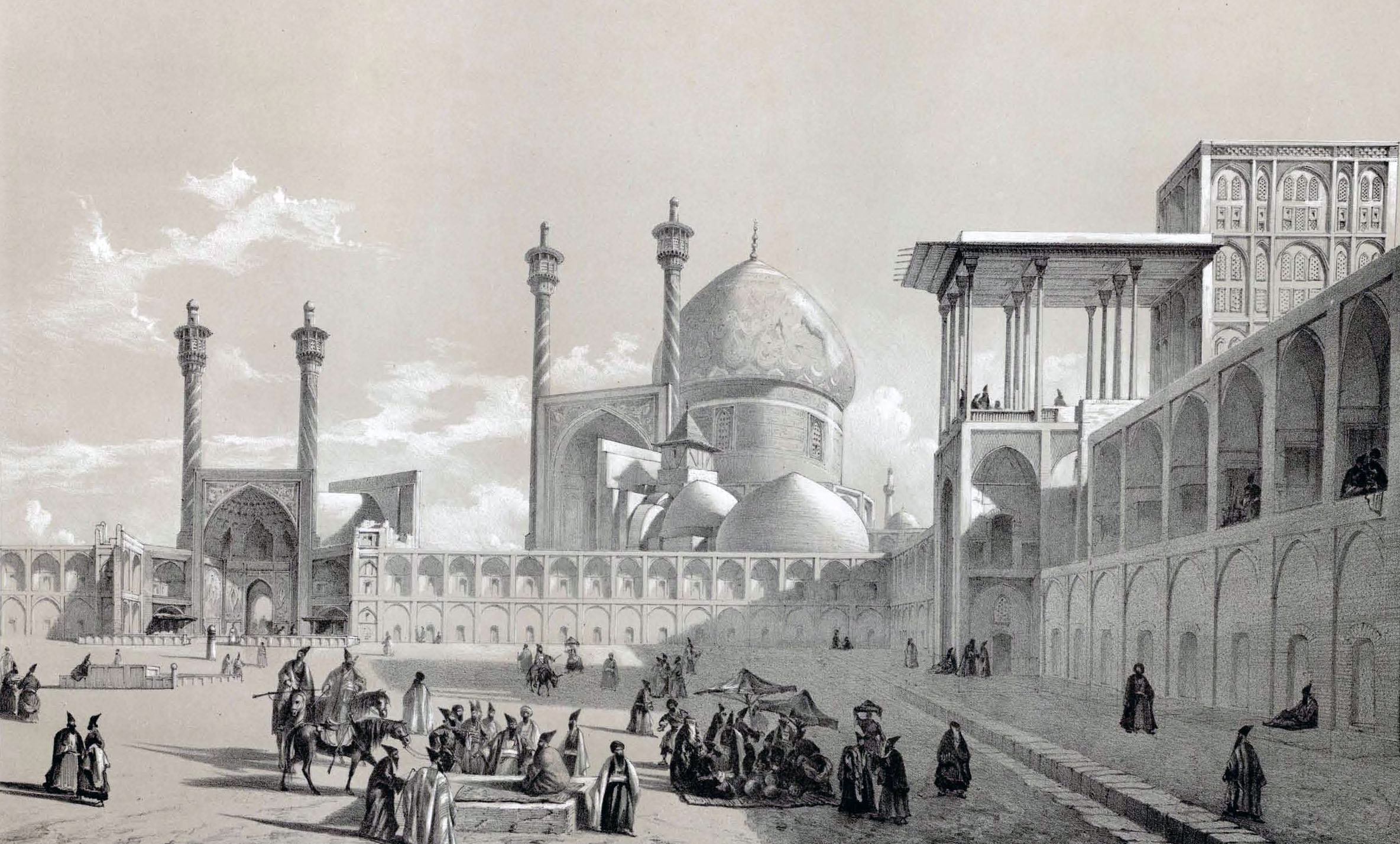
Maidan i Shah or Royal Square, Isfahan

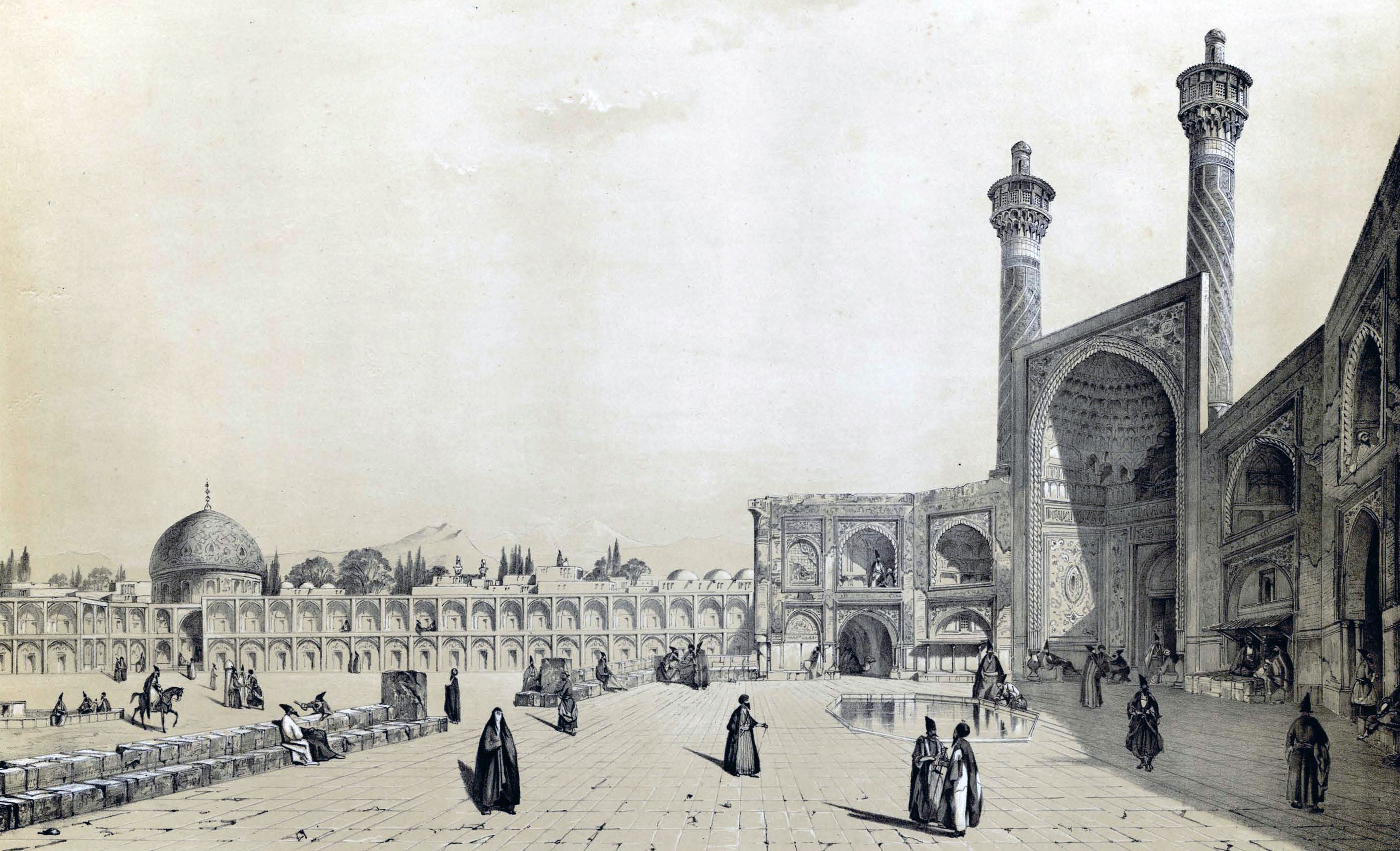
Entrance to Jameh Mosque of Isfahan

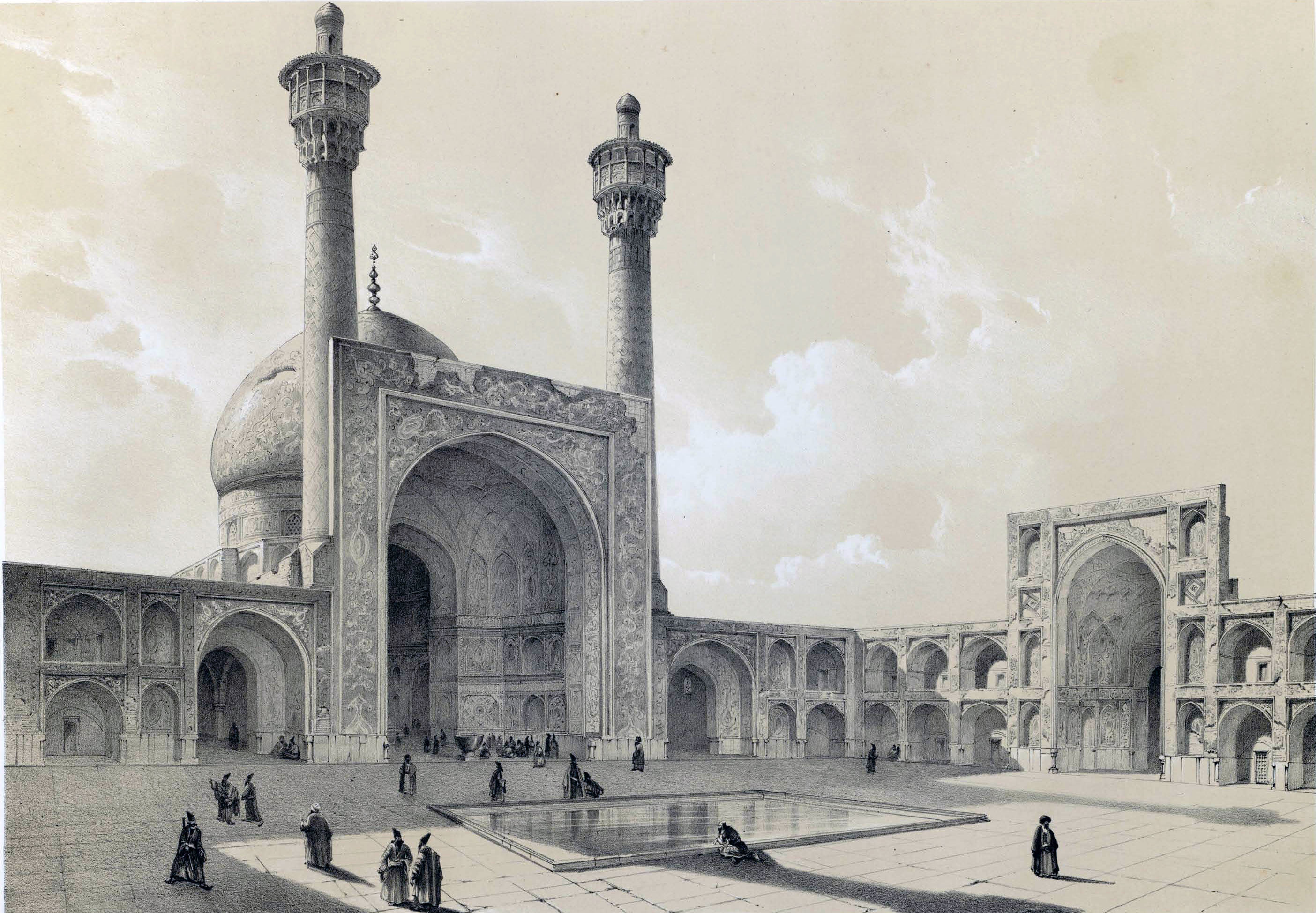
Courtyard of Jameh Mosque of Isfahan

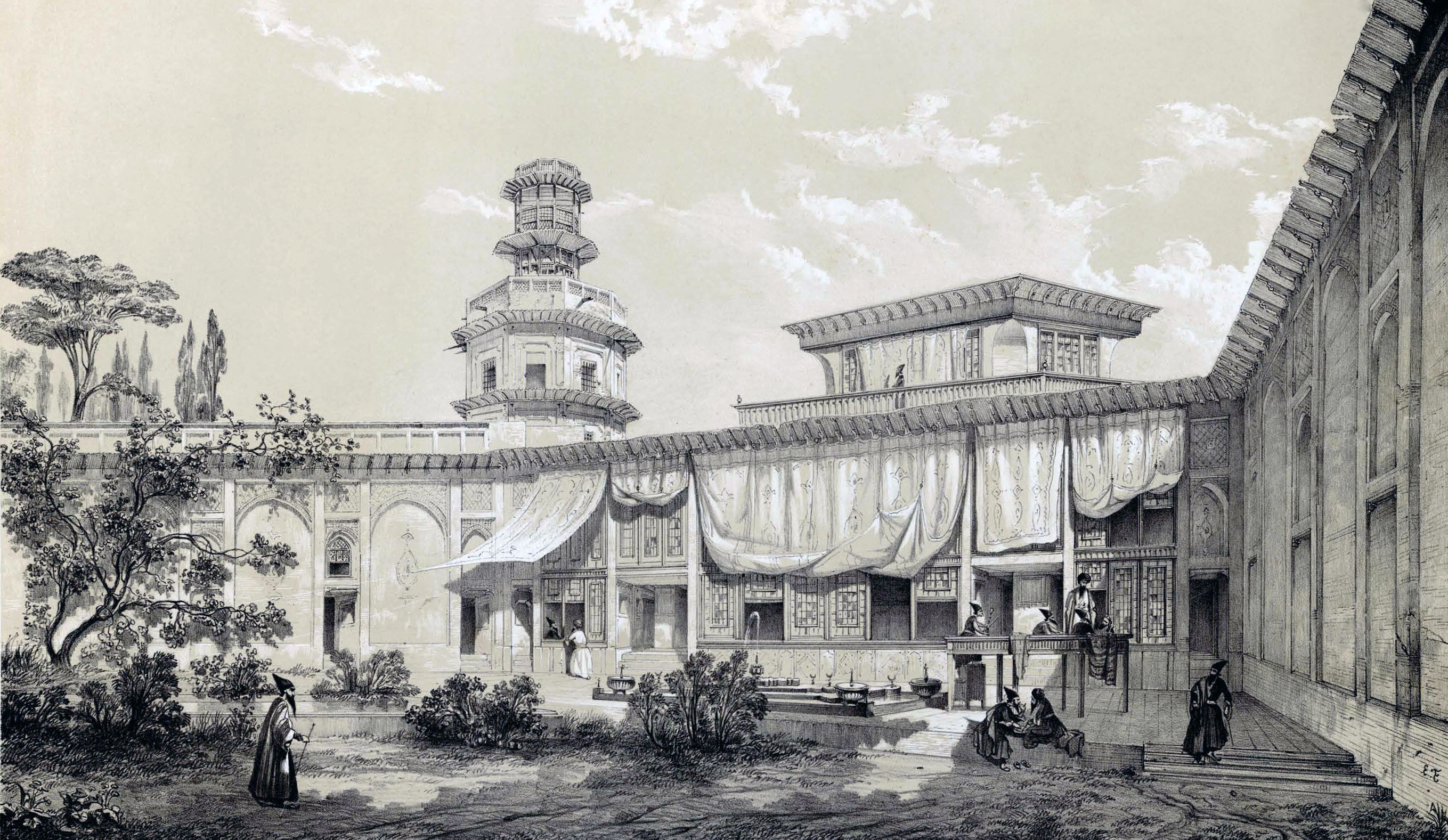
Char Bagh Palace, Isfahan

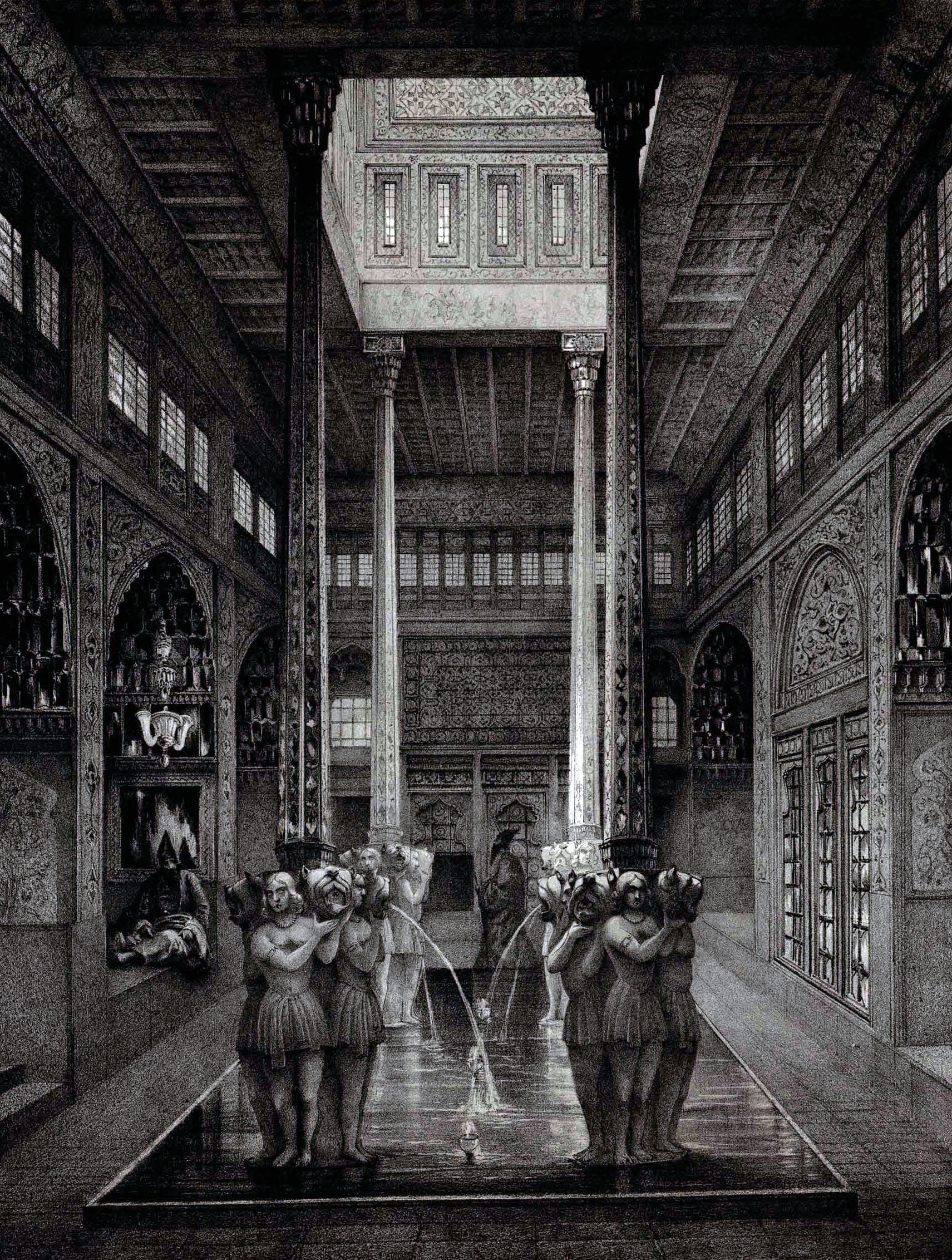
Khalvat (private) or Serpouchideh (roofed) room in Charbagh Palace in Isfahan

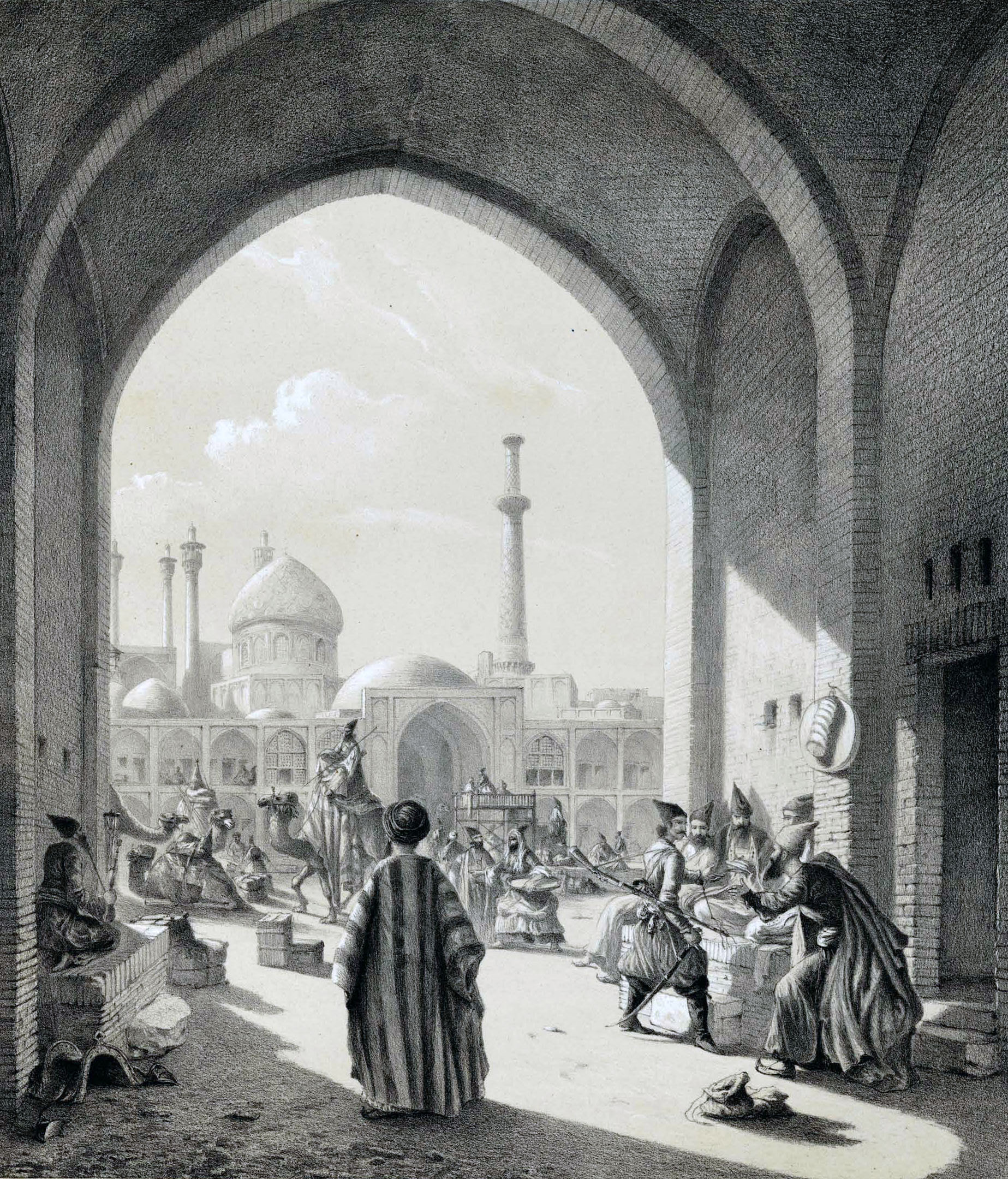
Enter a caravanserai near Jameh Mosque of Isfahan

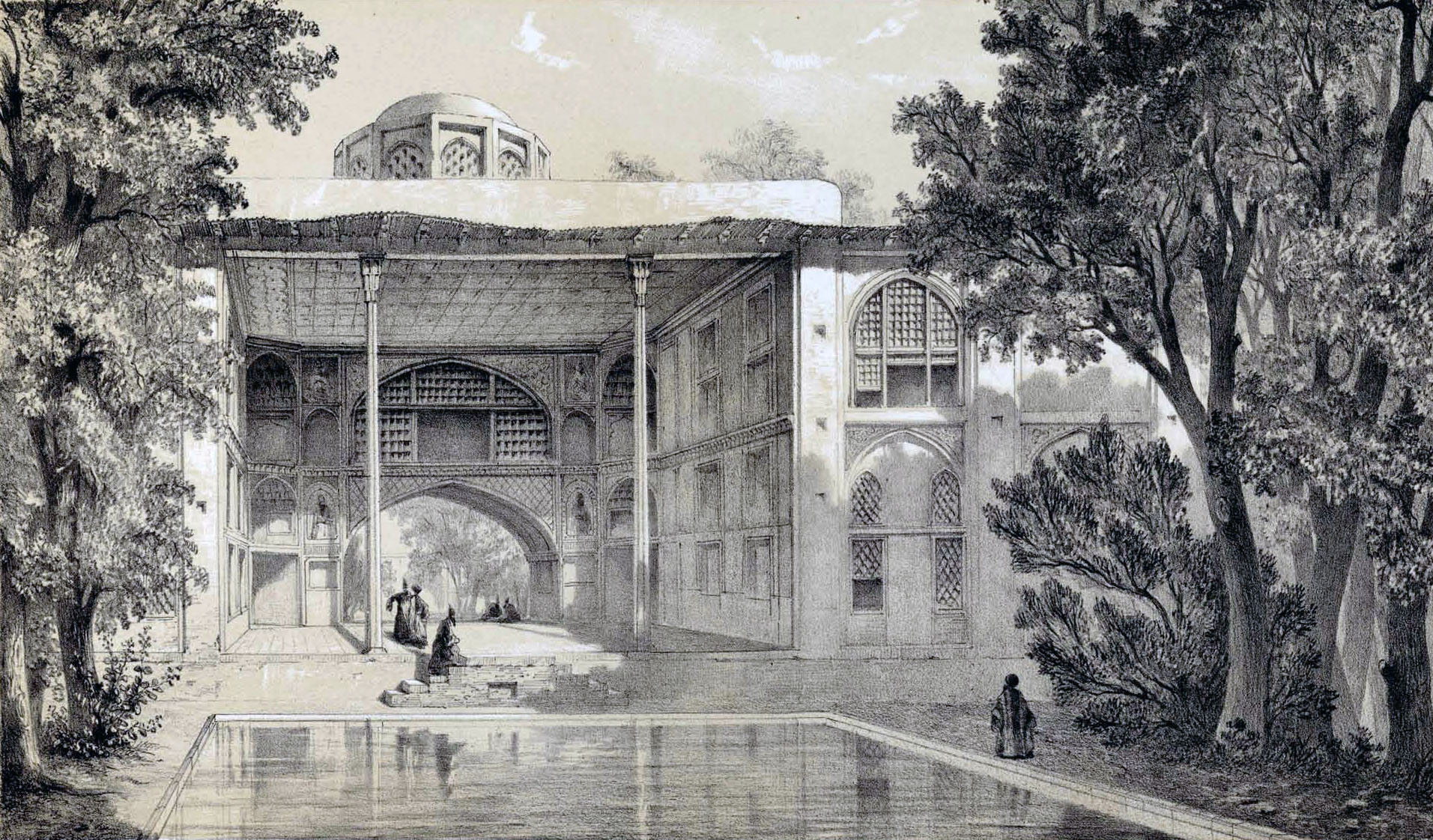
Kiosk Hasht Behesht, Isfahan

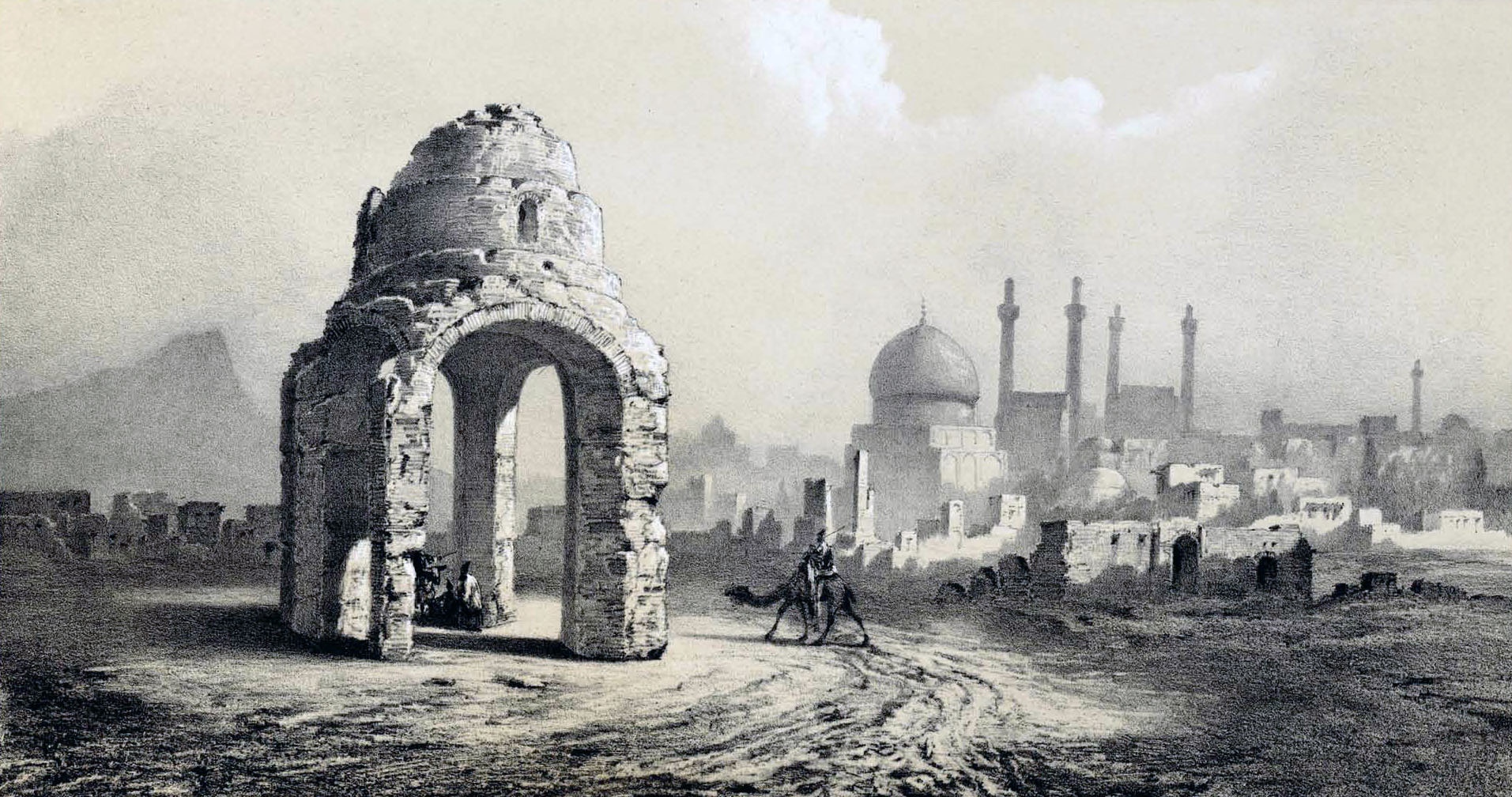
Mausoleum in the vicinity of Isfahan

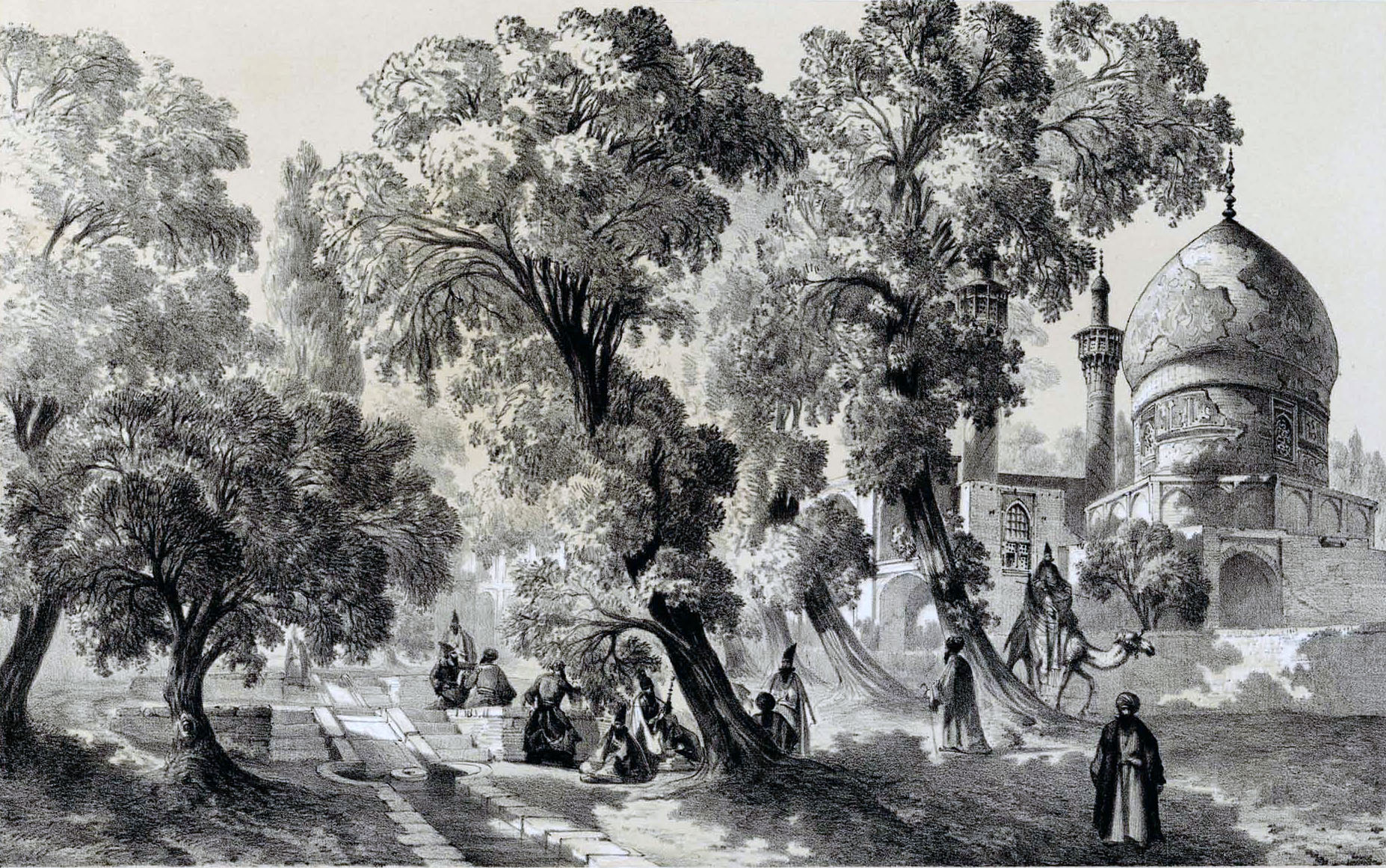
(Avenue Char Bagh and) Mosque Shah Sultan Hussein

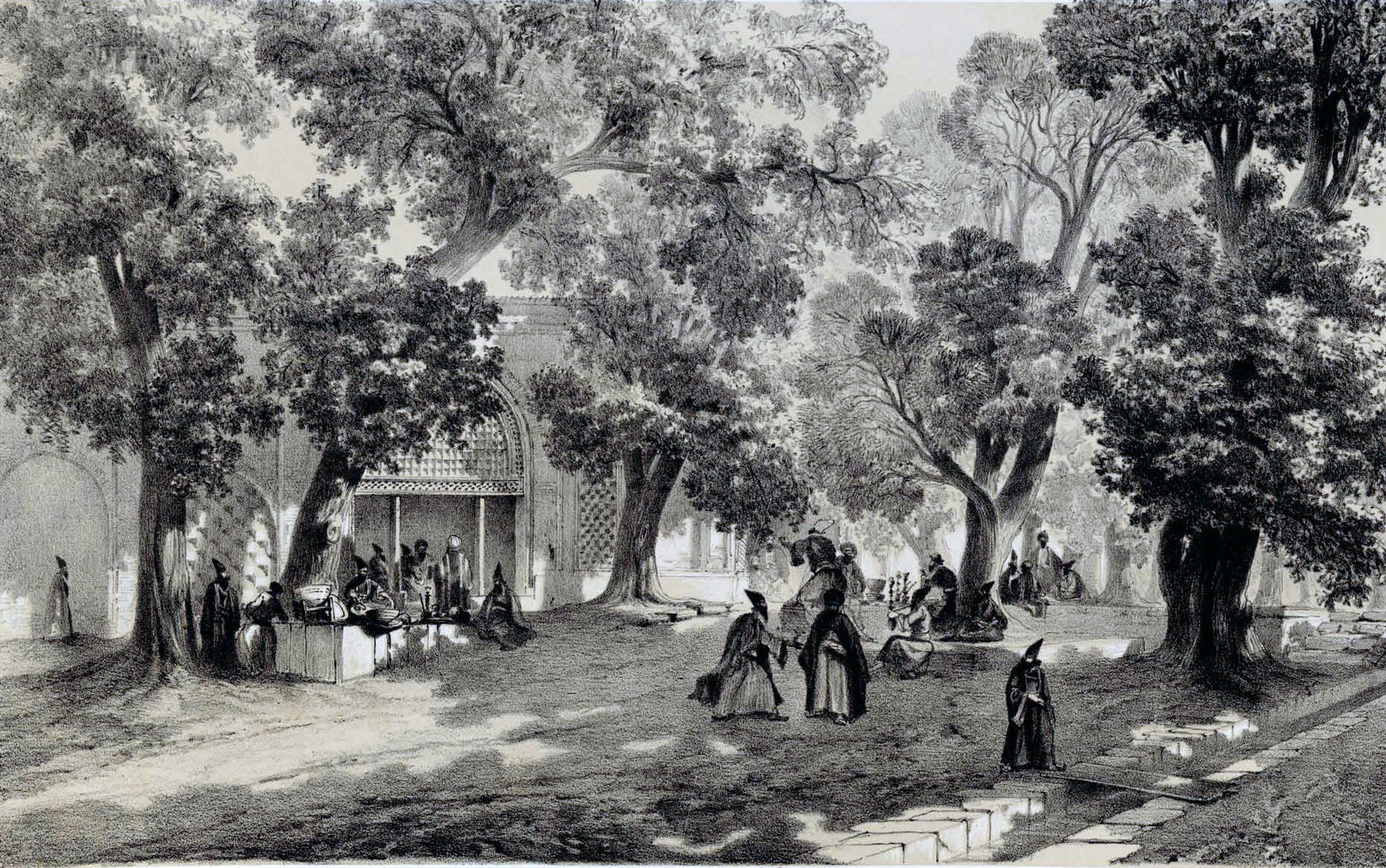
Avenue Char Bagh, Isfahan

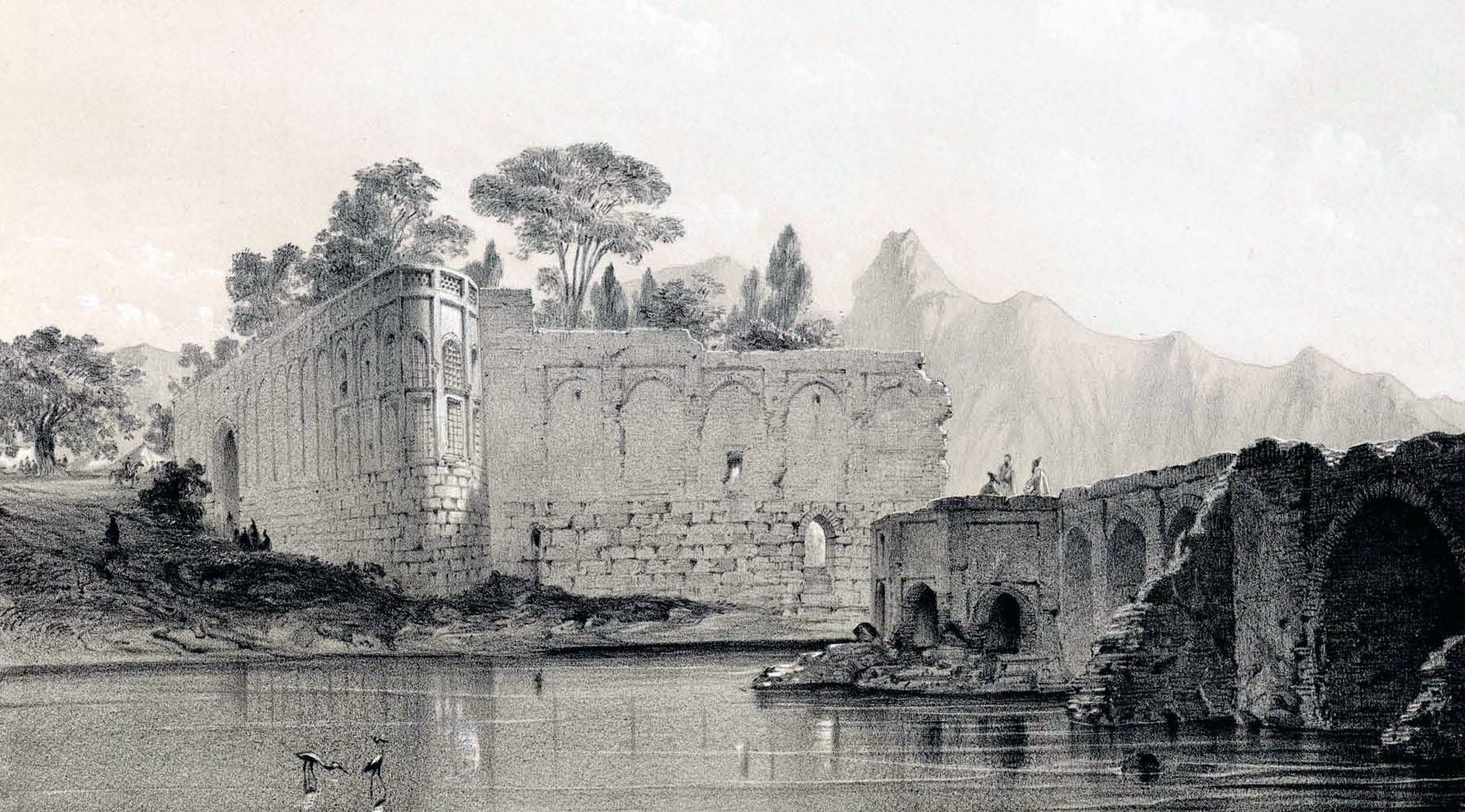
Edges Zendeh Rud (Palace Haft Dast & Joubi Bridge), Isfahan

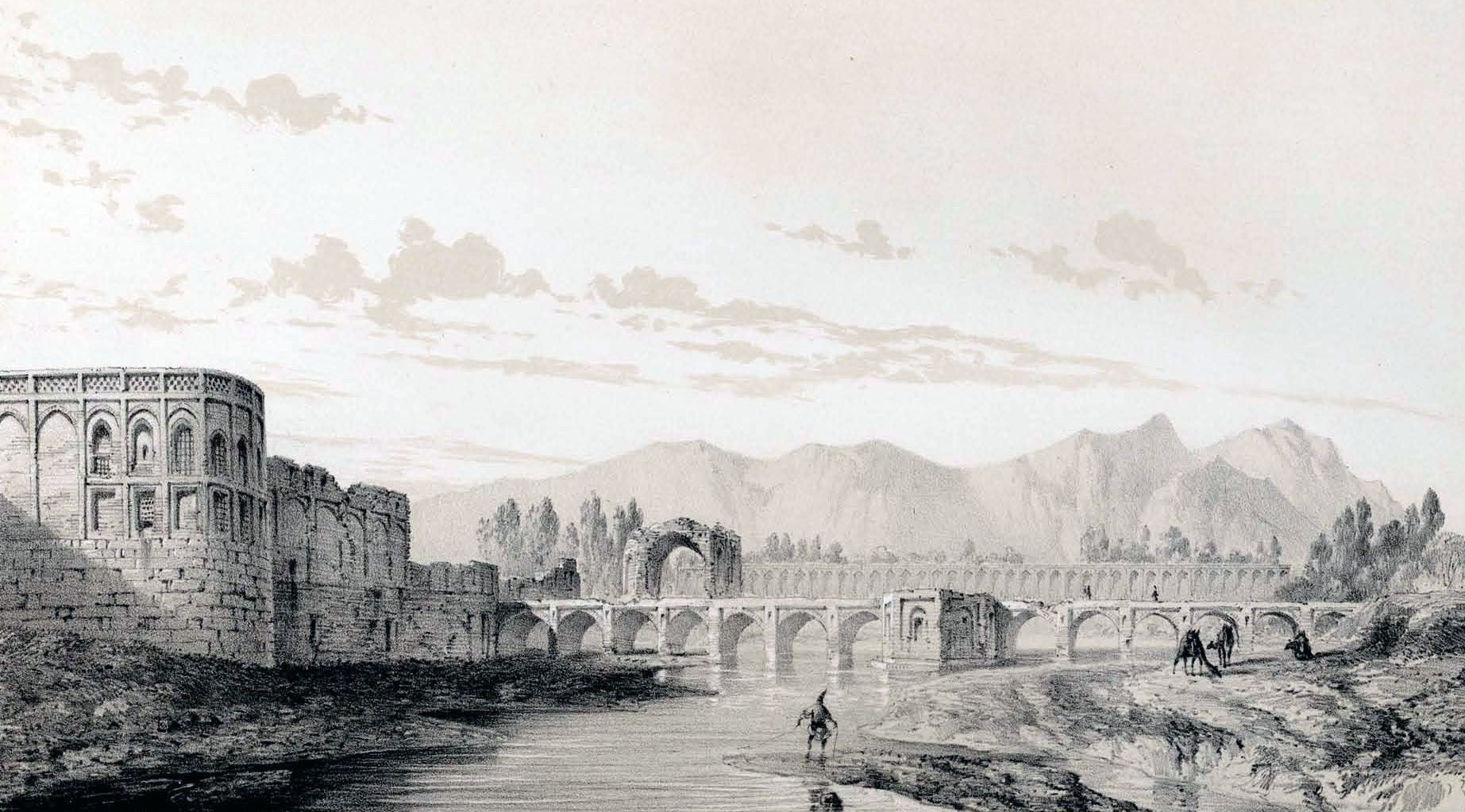
Palace Haft Dast & Joubi Bridge

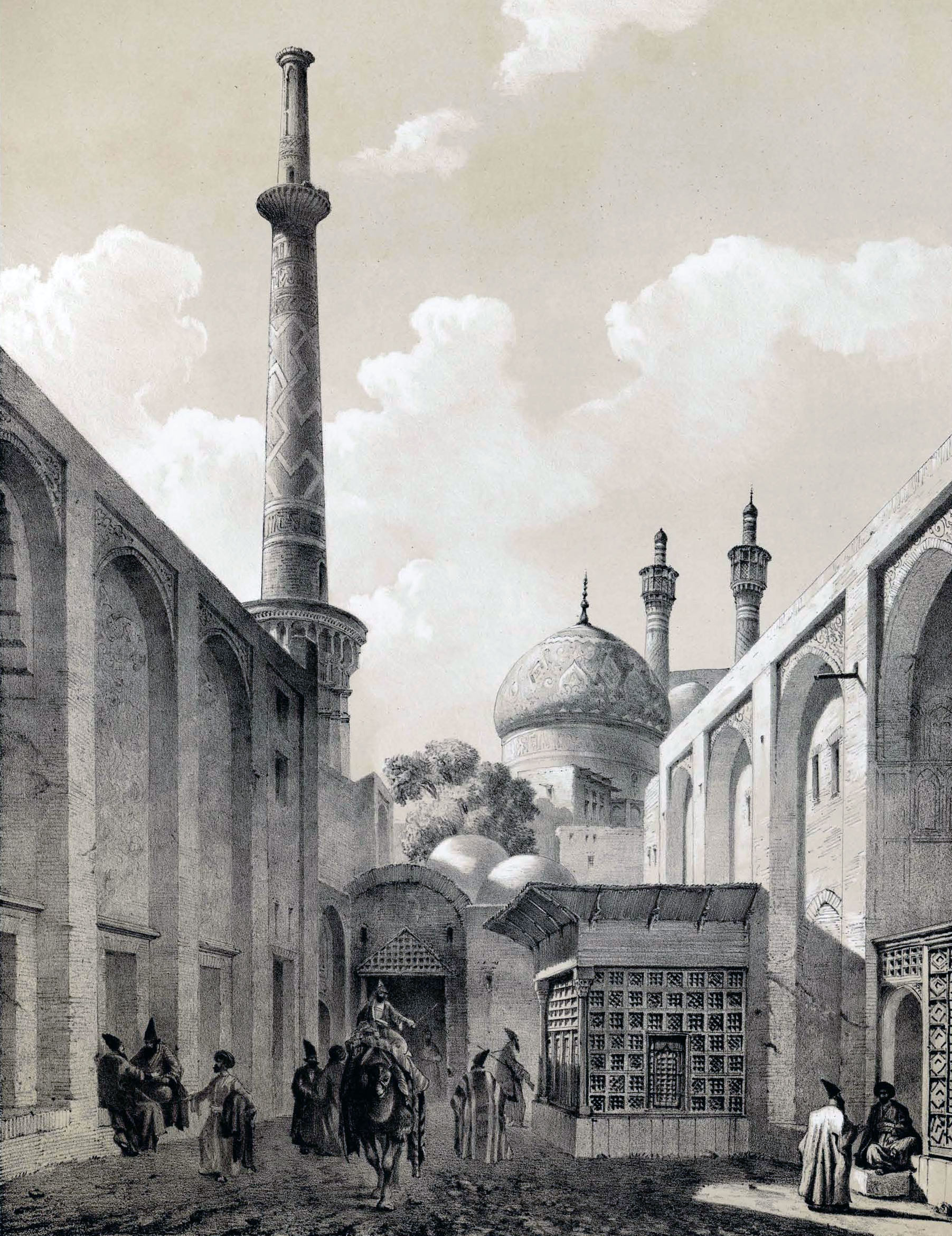
Ali minaret, Isfahan

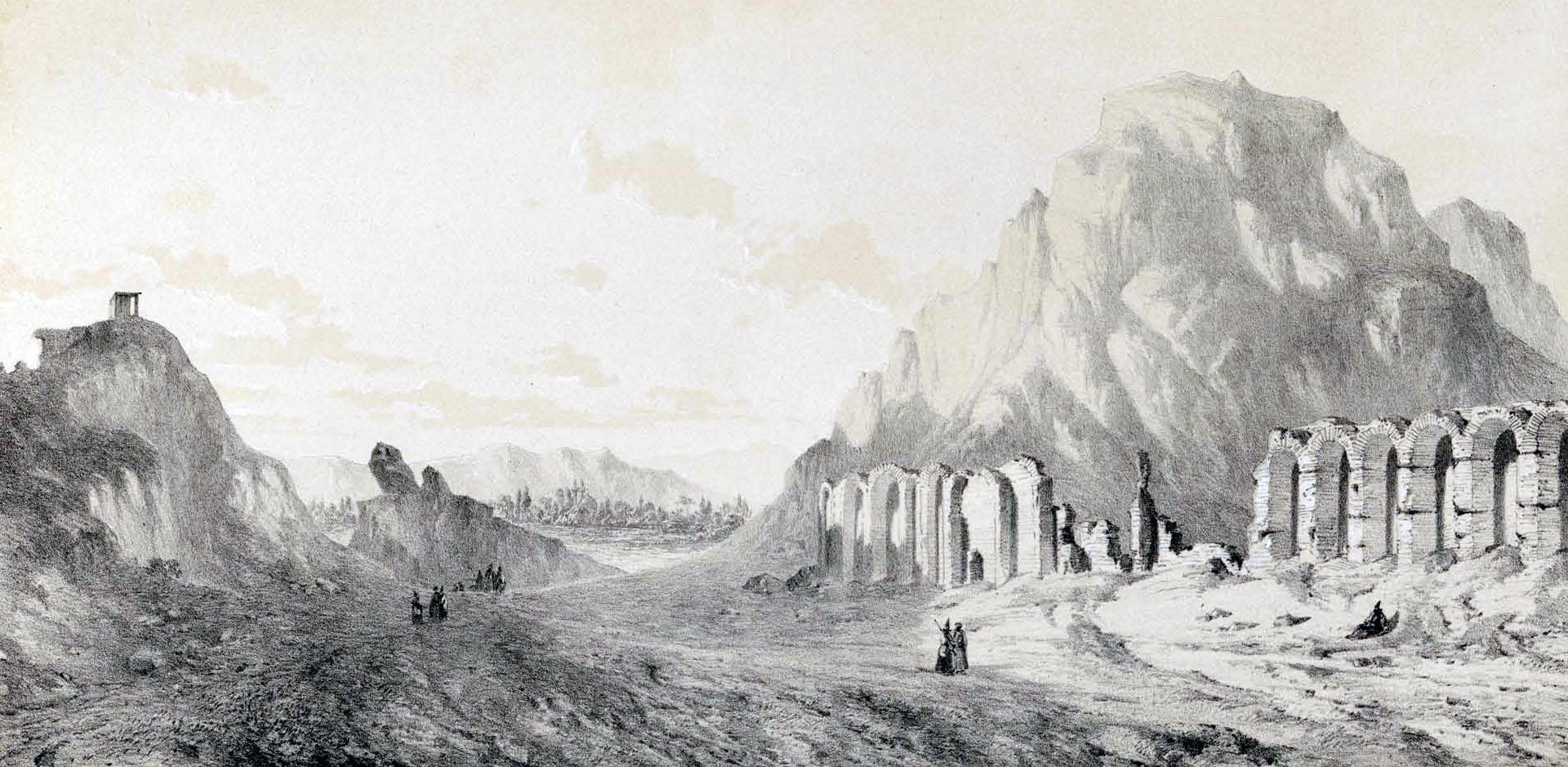
Ruins of the Palace Farahabad, near Isfahan

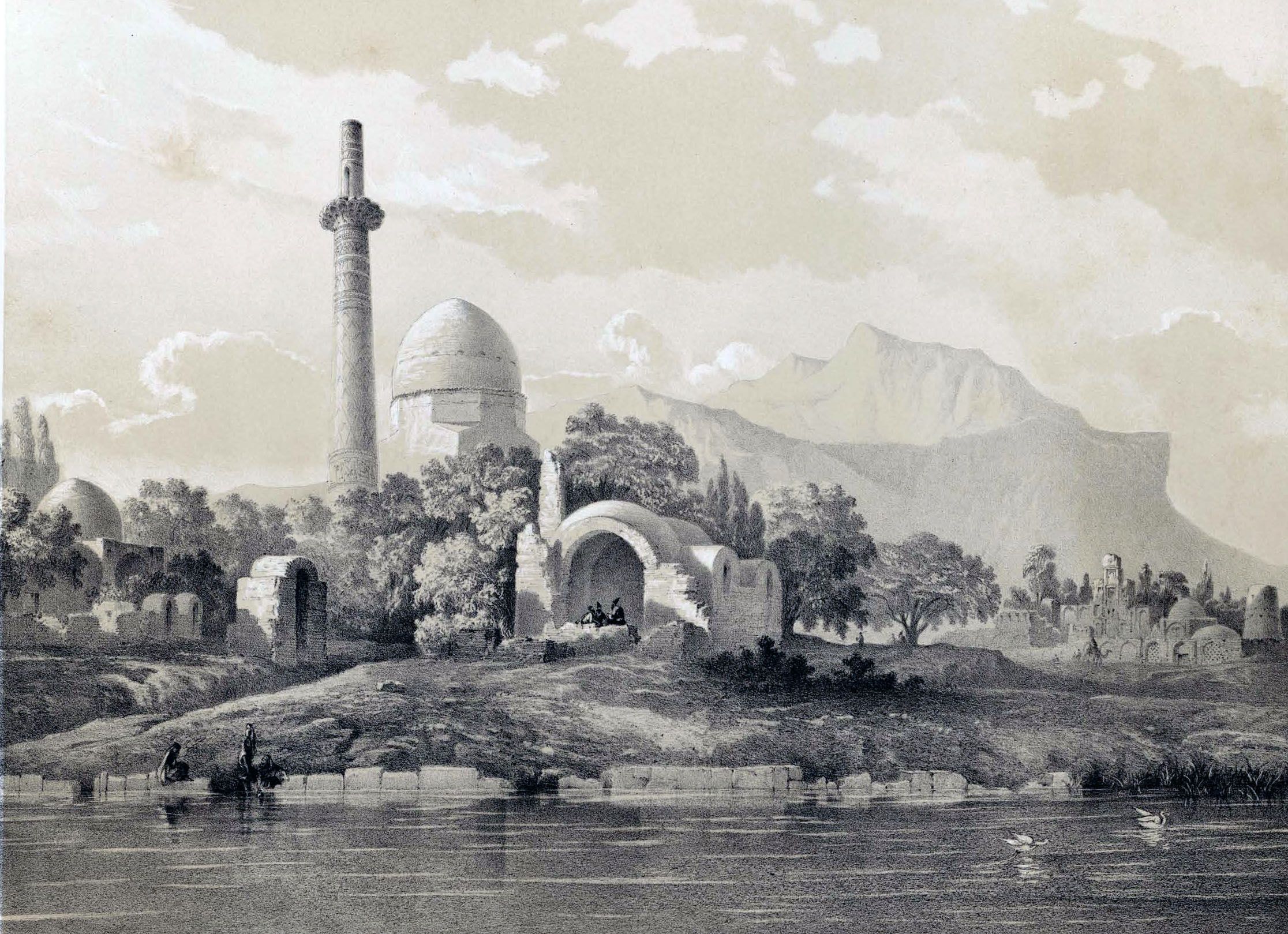
Shaherestan village, near Isfahan

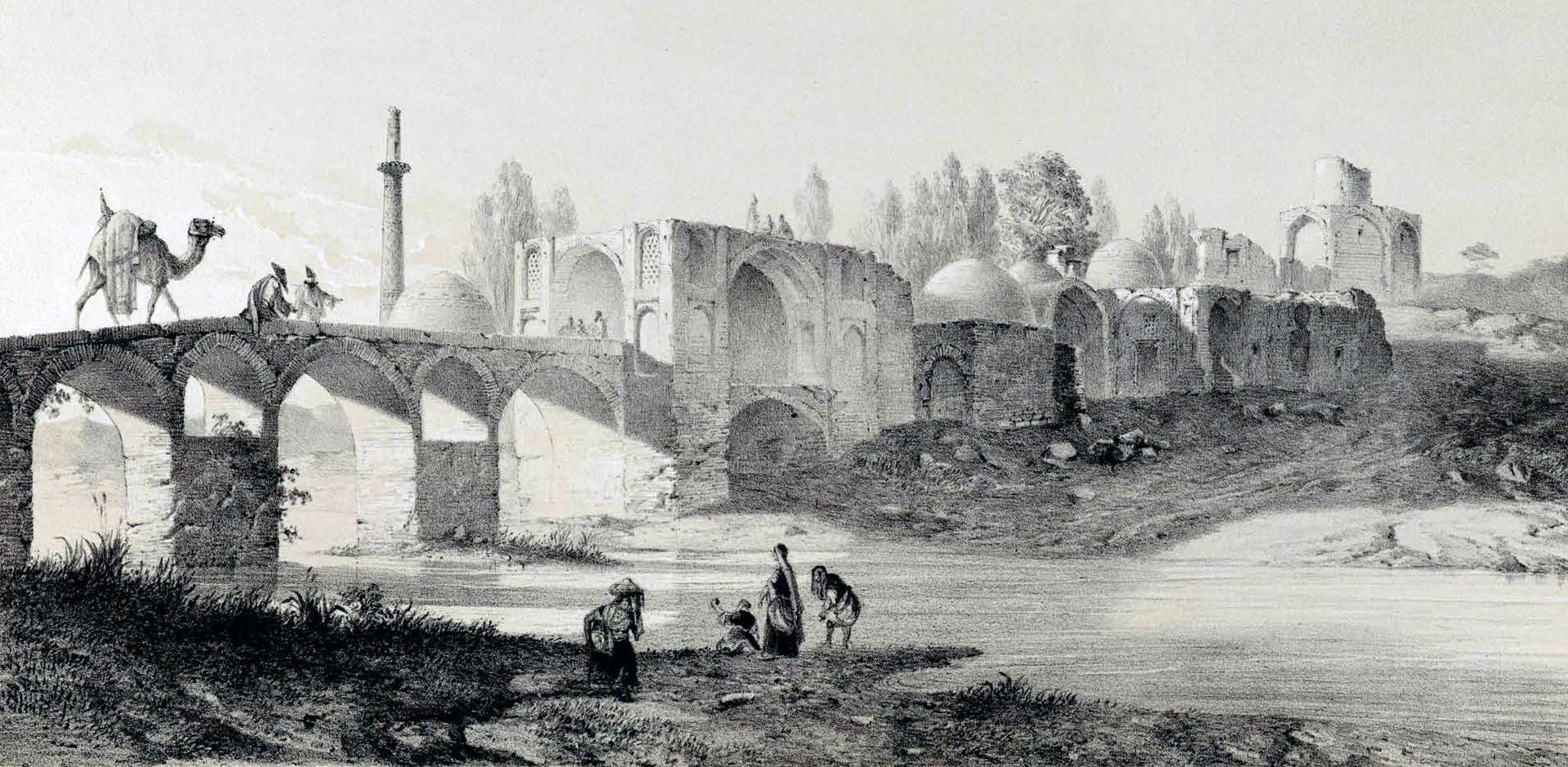
Shaherestan village, near Isfahan

=== Pascal Coste ===
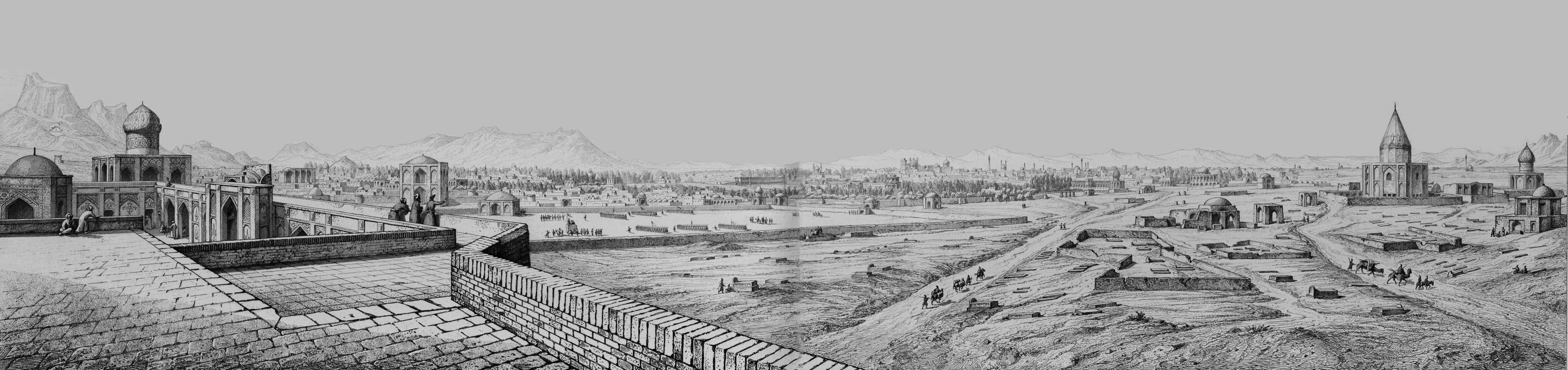
Isfahan Panorama

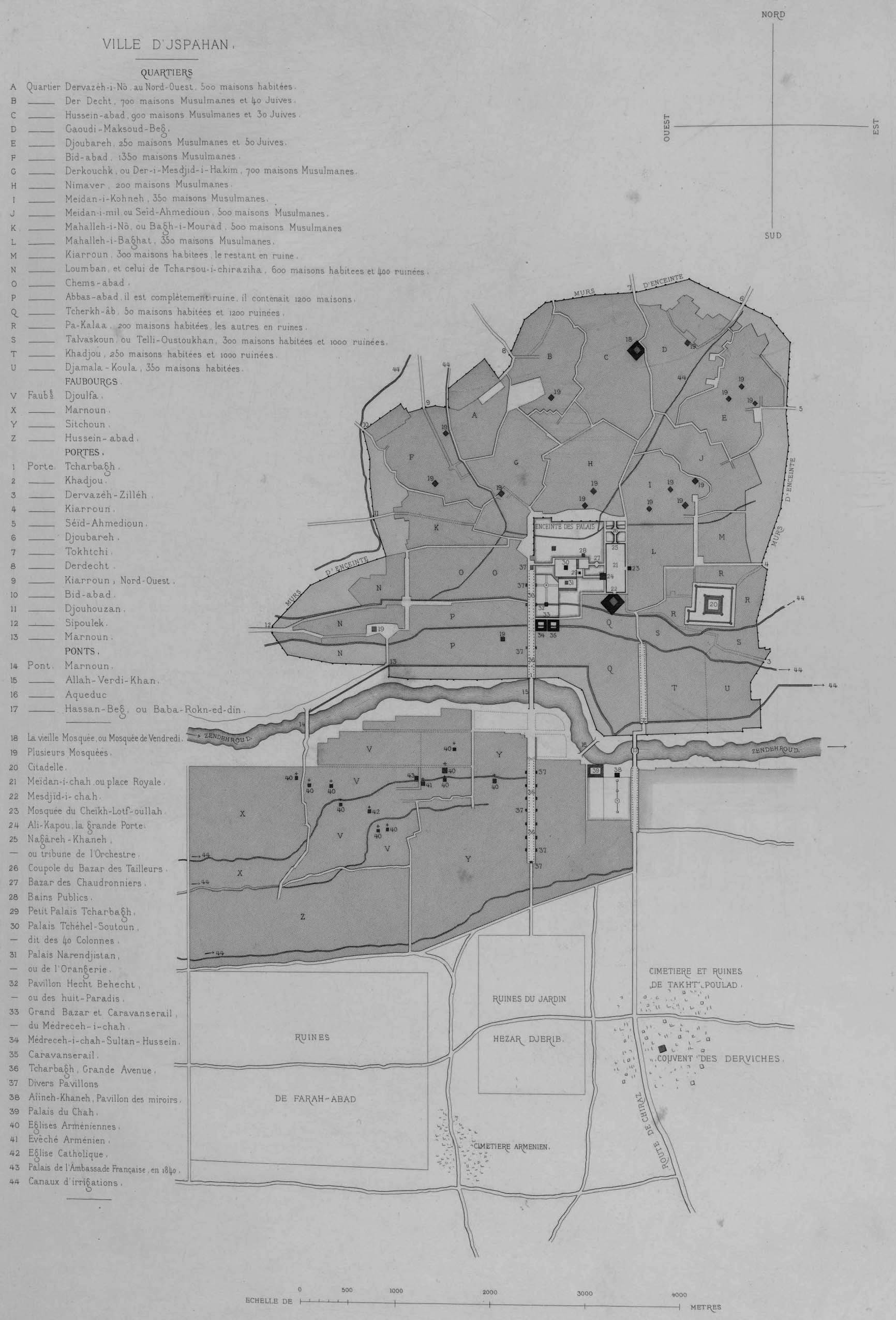
General map of Isfahan

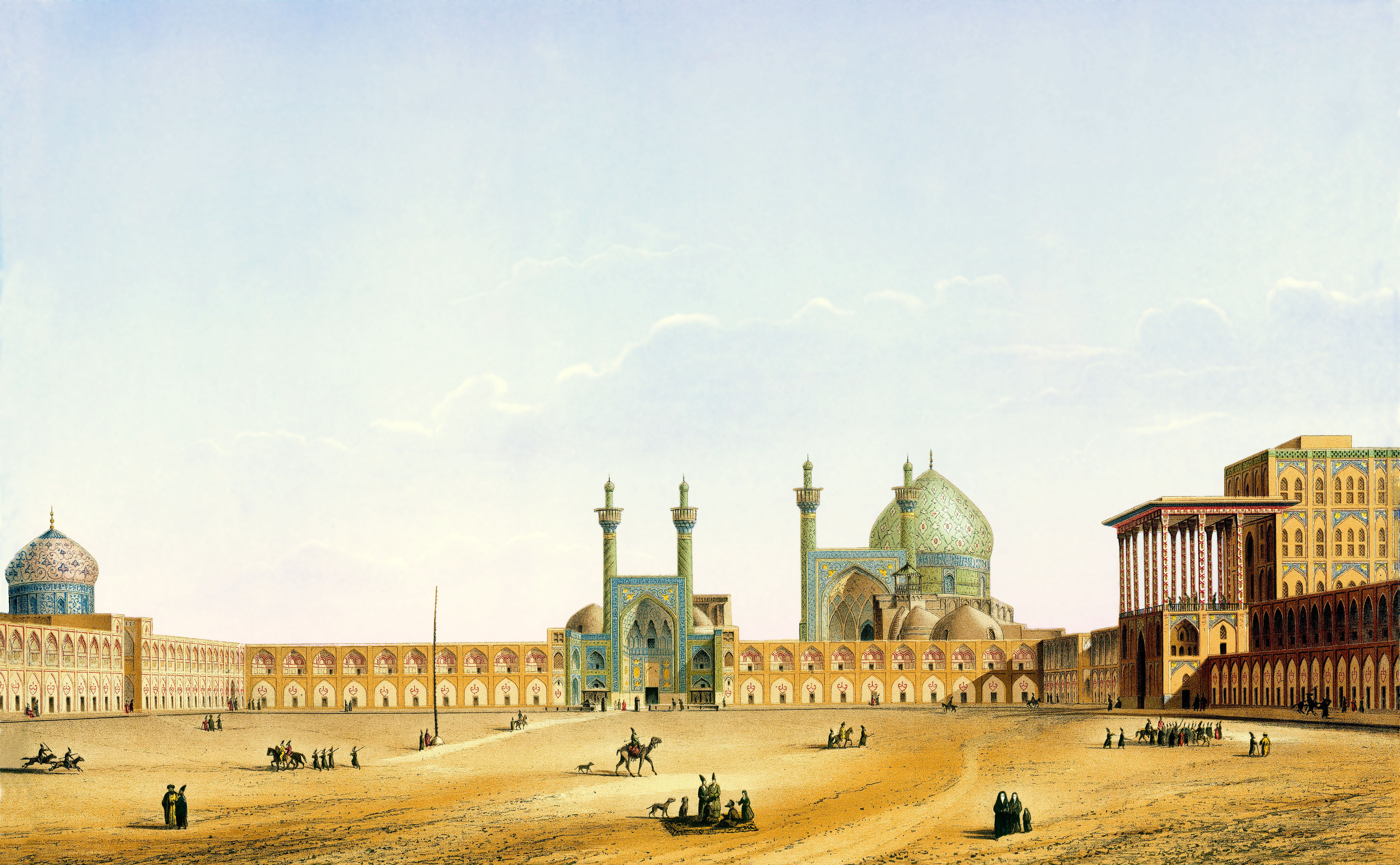
Shah Mosque (Square), Isfahan

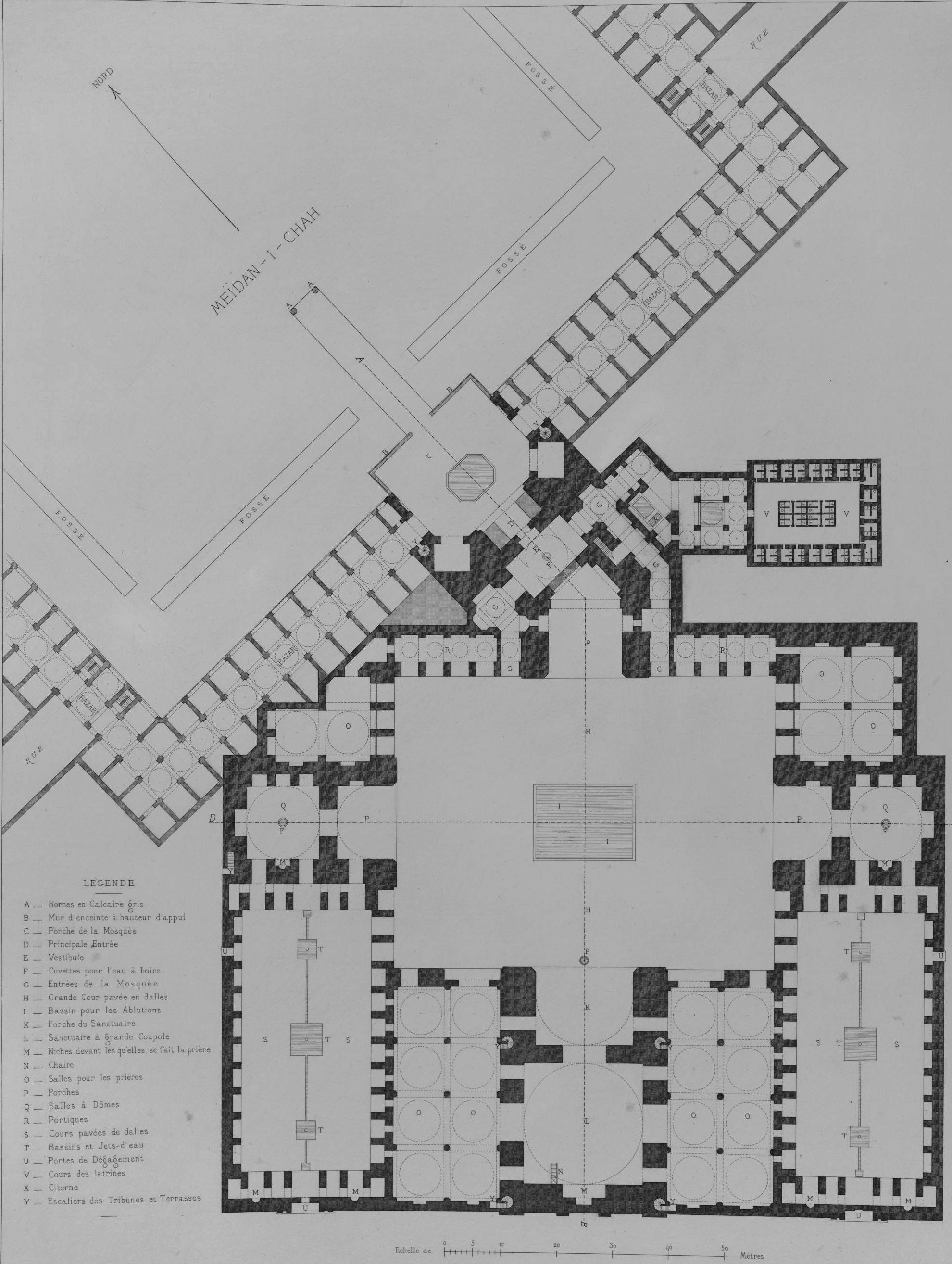
Shah Mosque, Isfahan, General Plan

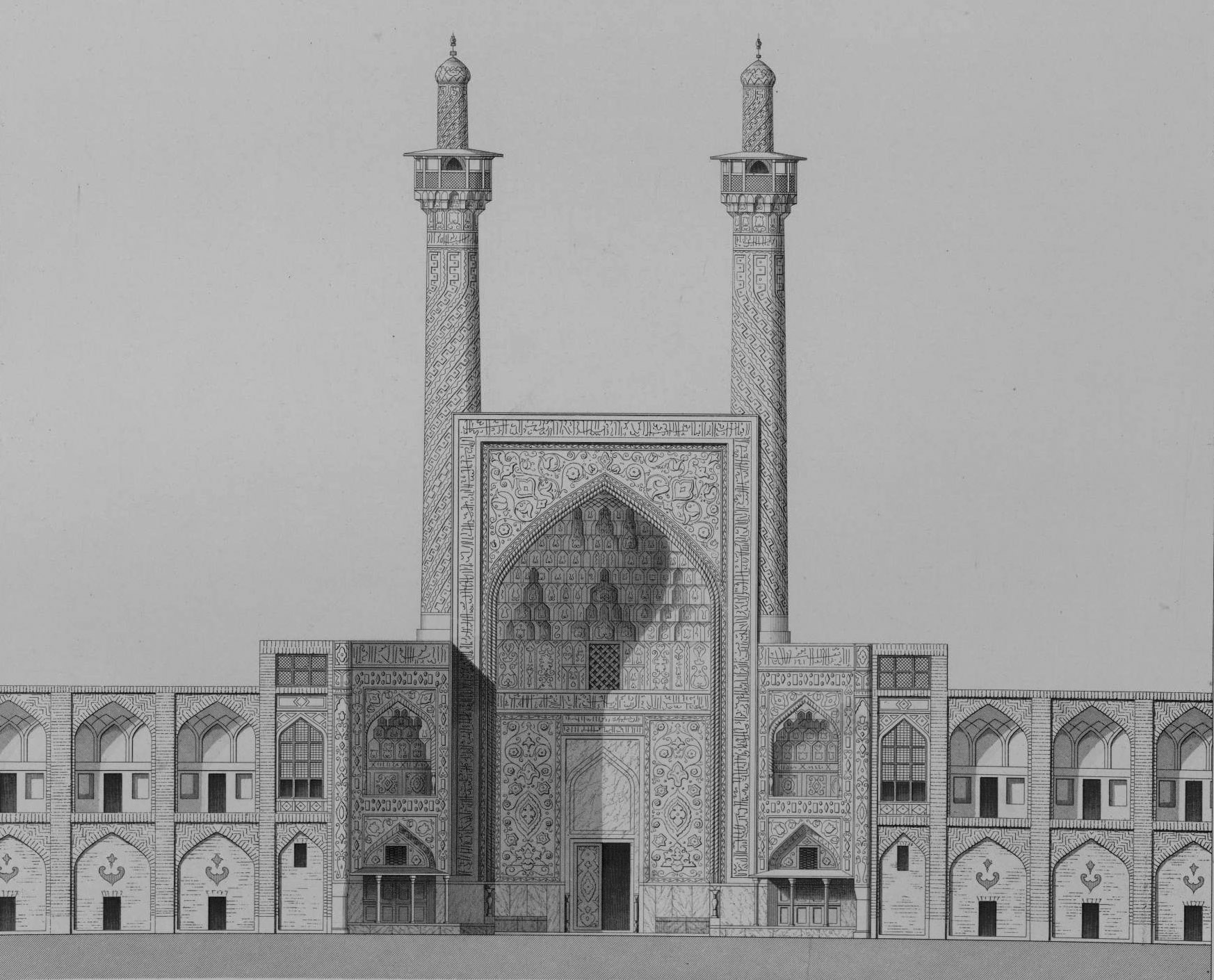
Shah Mosque, Isfahan, Main Gate

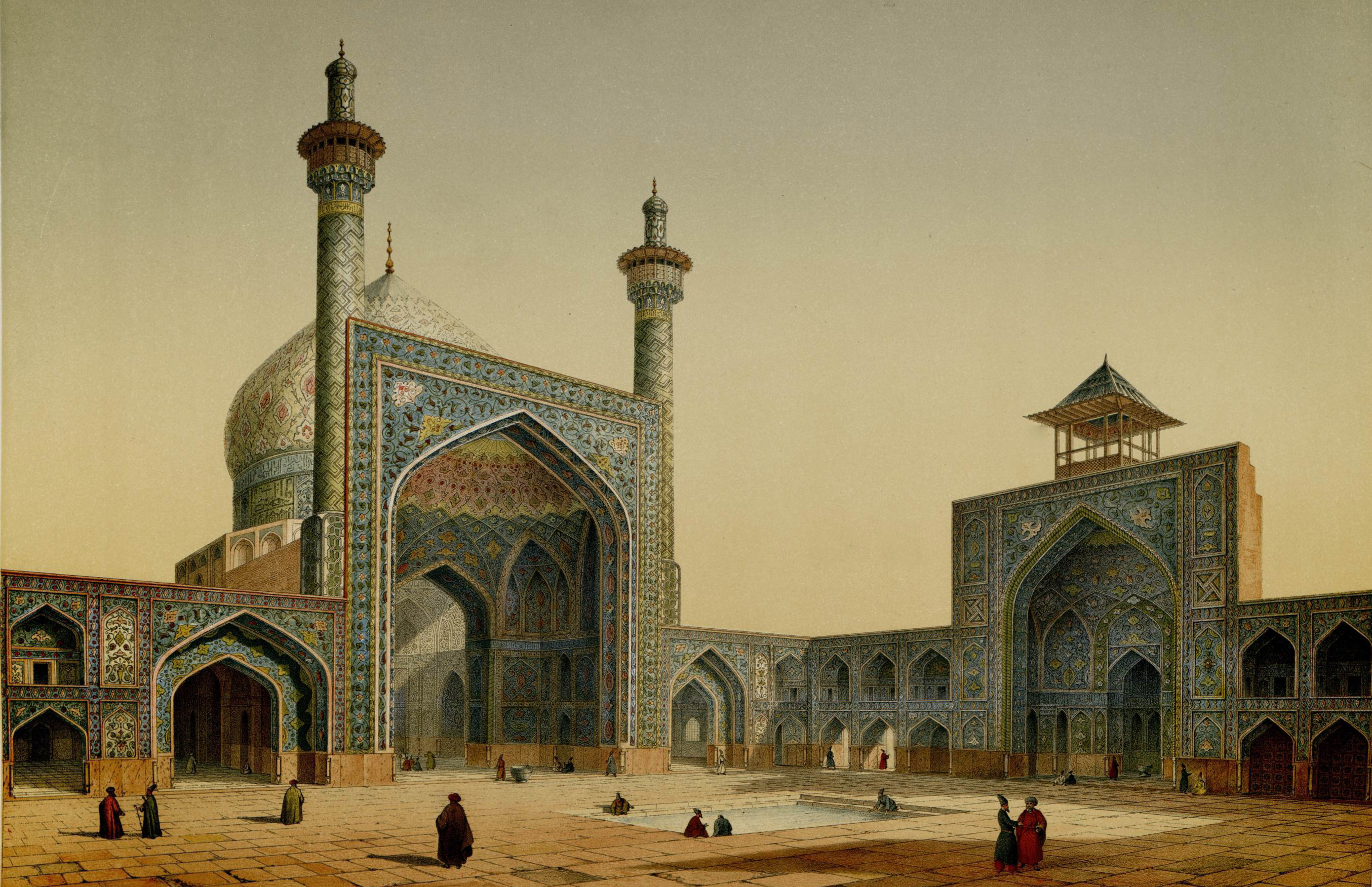
Shah Mosque, Isfahan, view of the courtyard

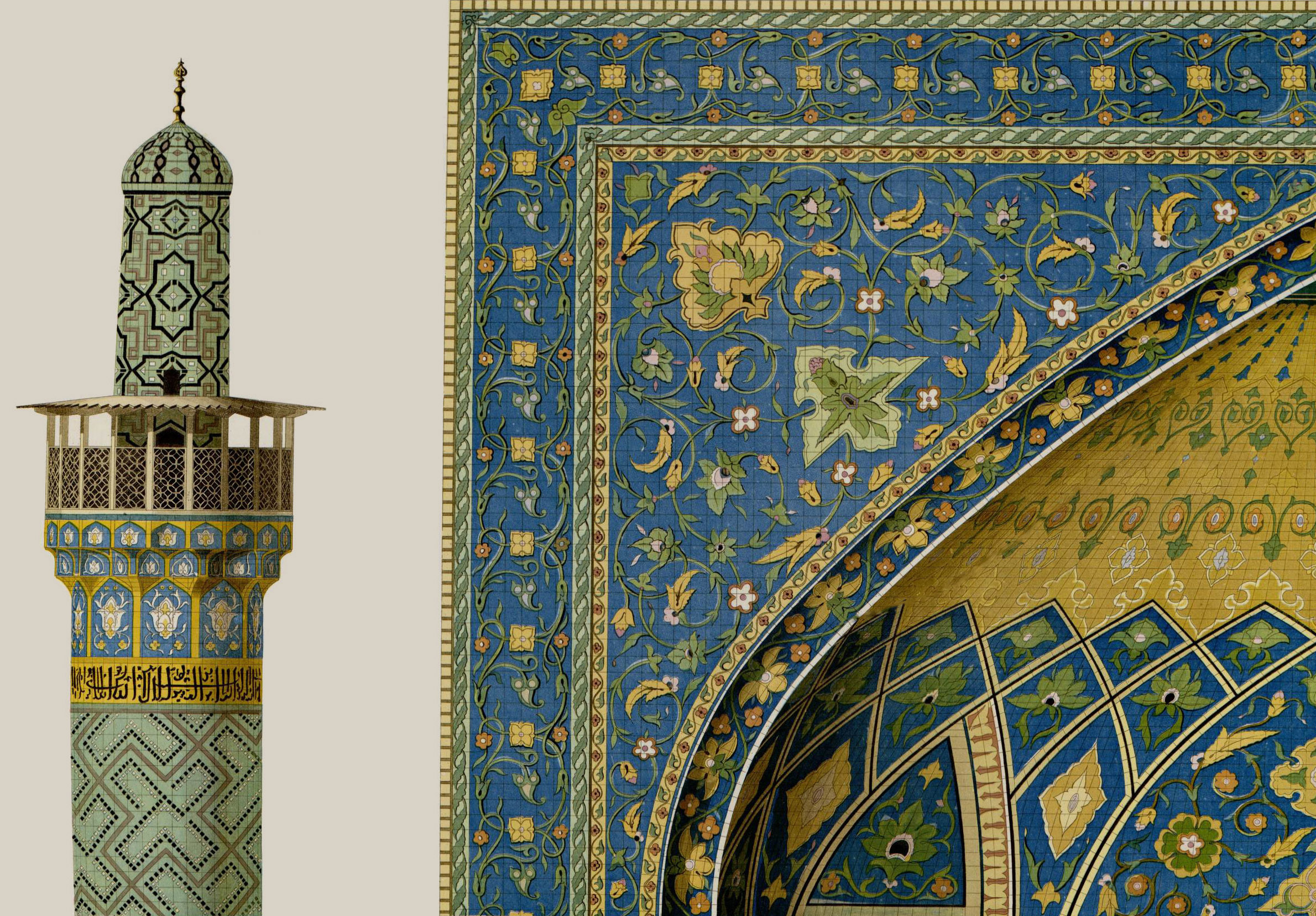
Shah Mosque, Isfahan, Détails

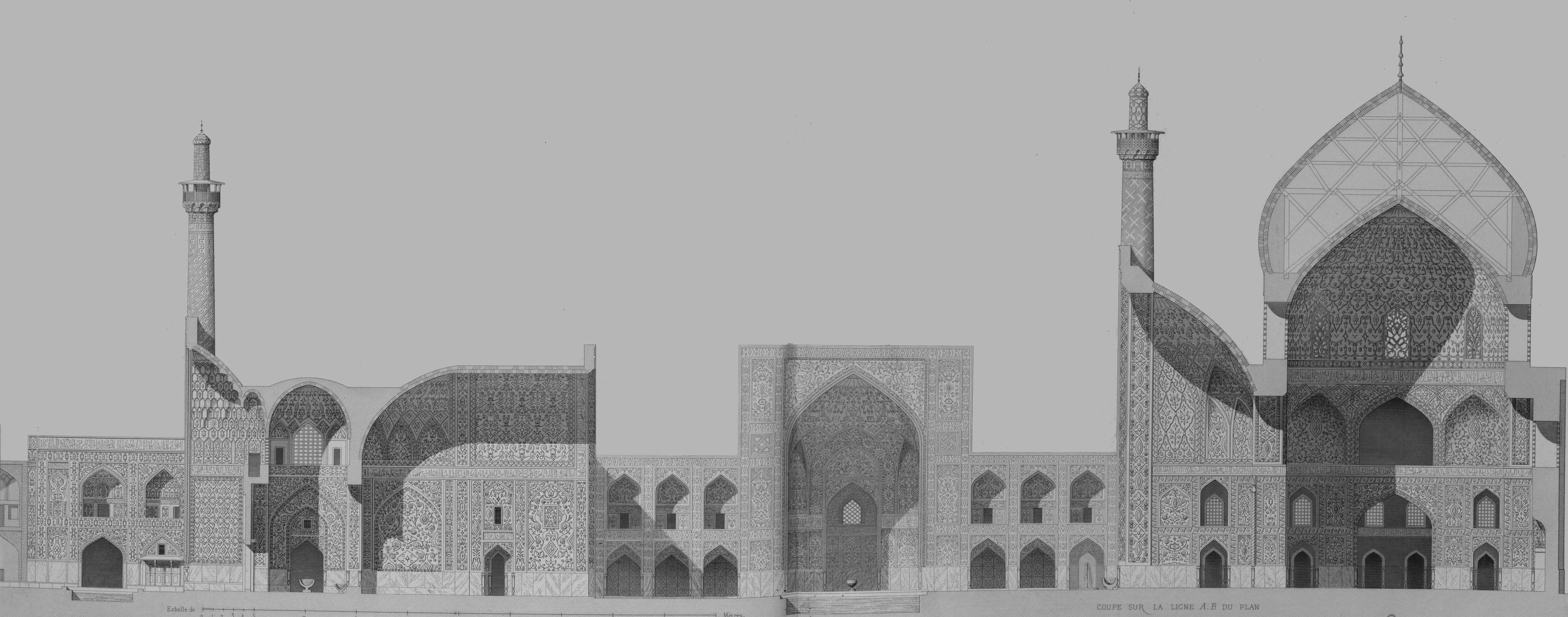
Shah Mosque, Isfahan, Facade

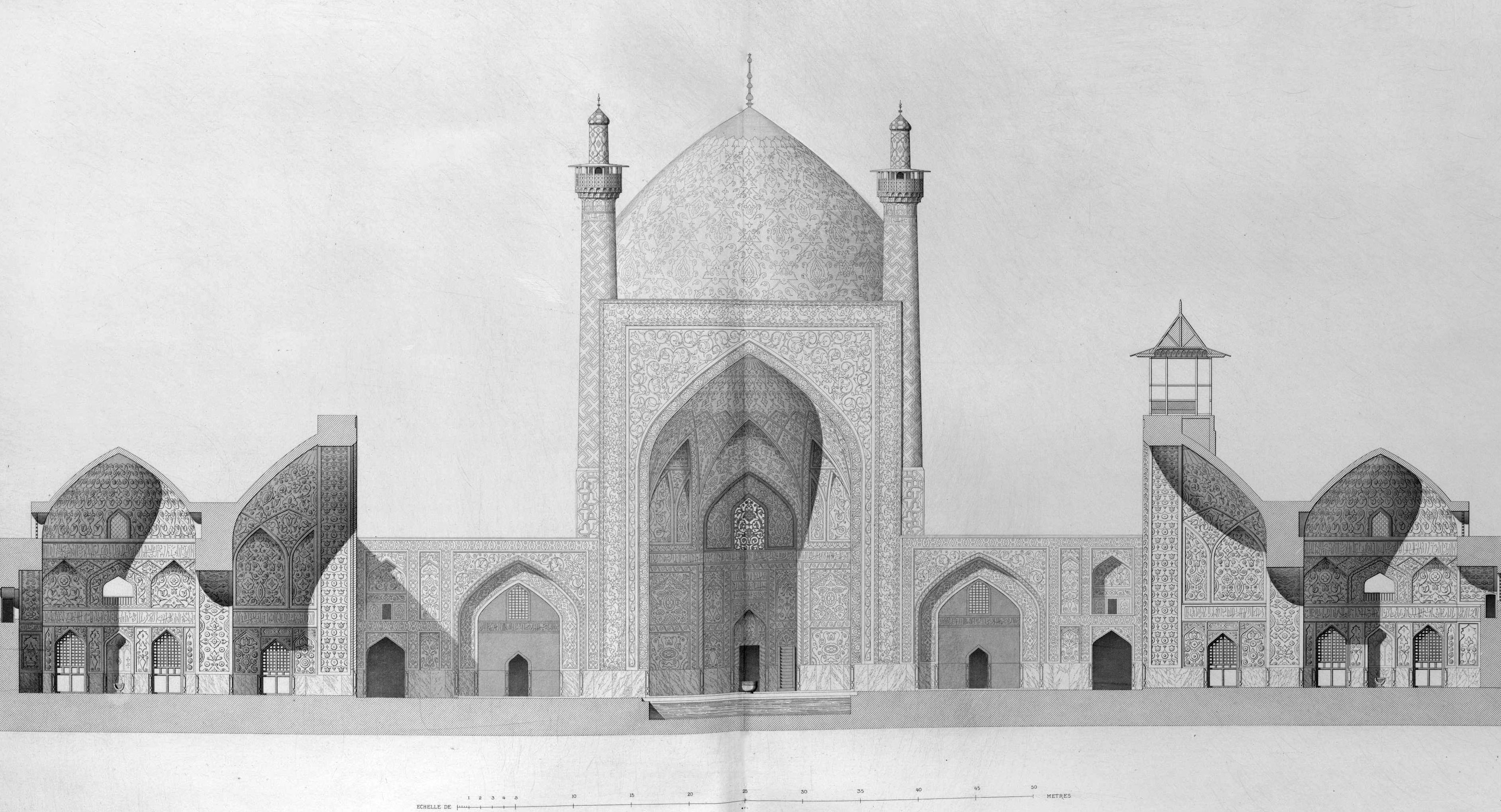
Shah Mosque, Isfahan, Cup

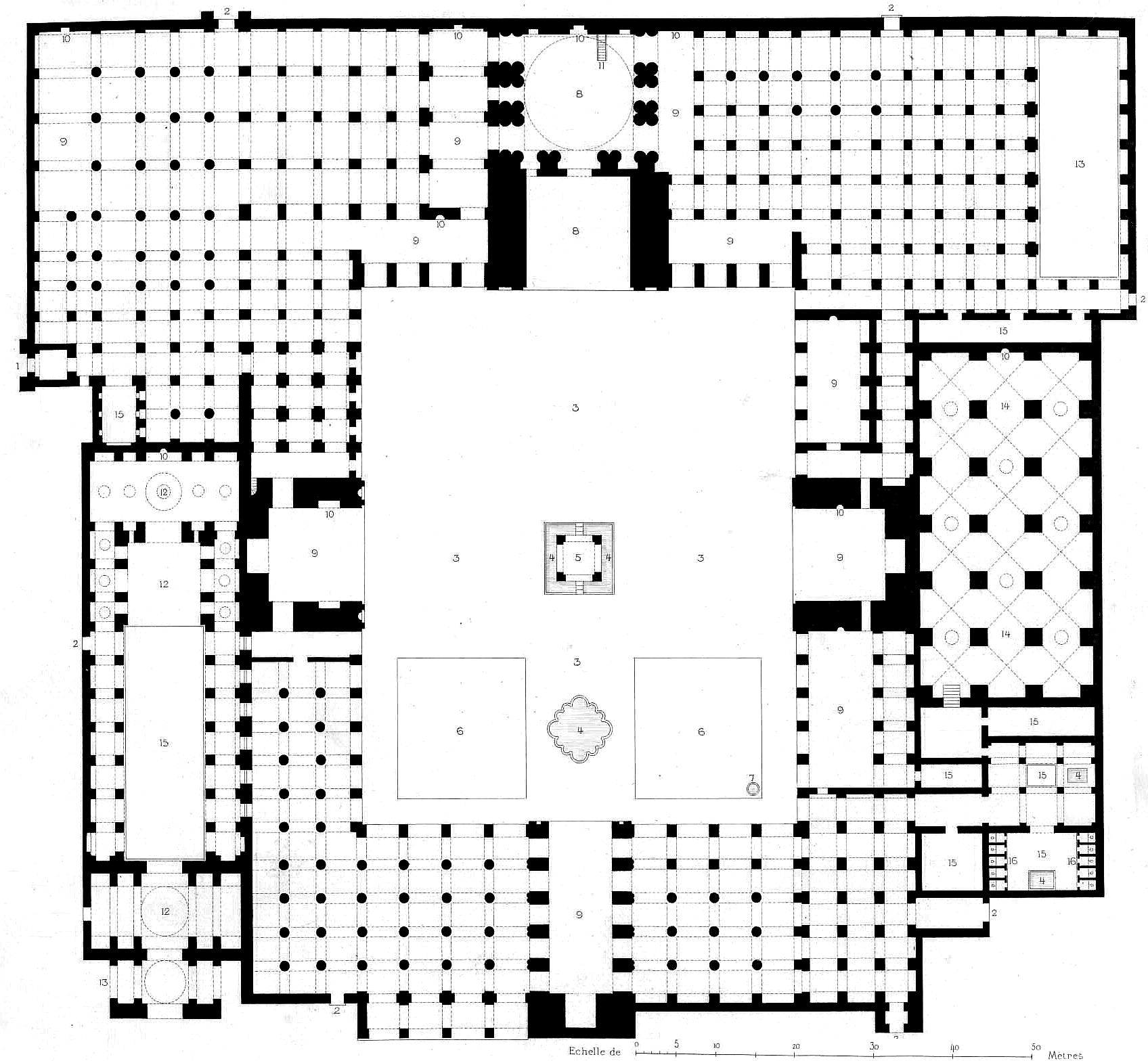
Plan of Jameh Mosque of Isfahan

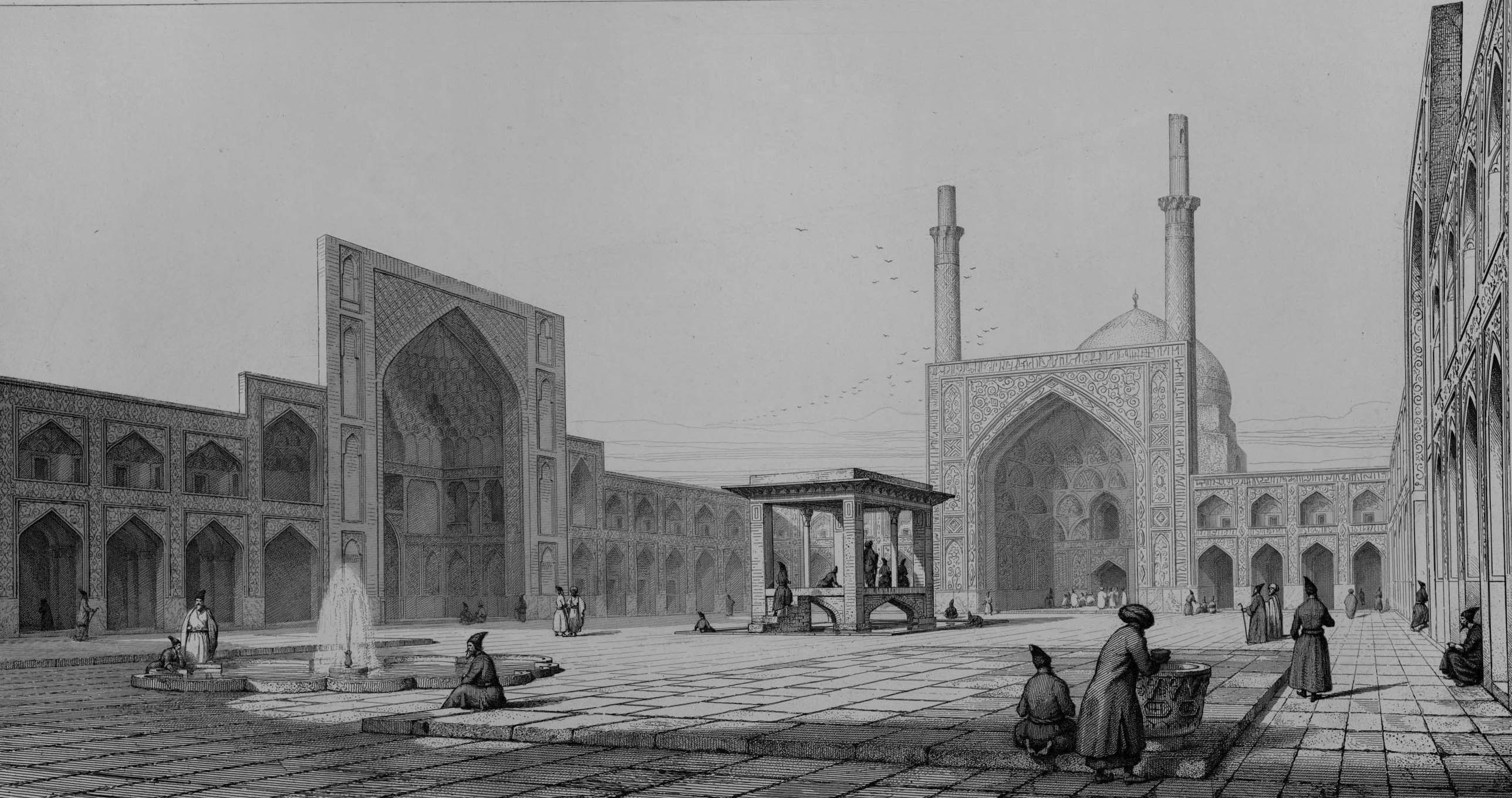
Front Jameh Mosque of Isfahan

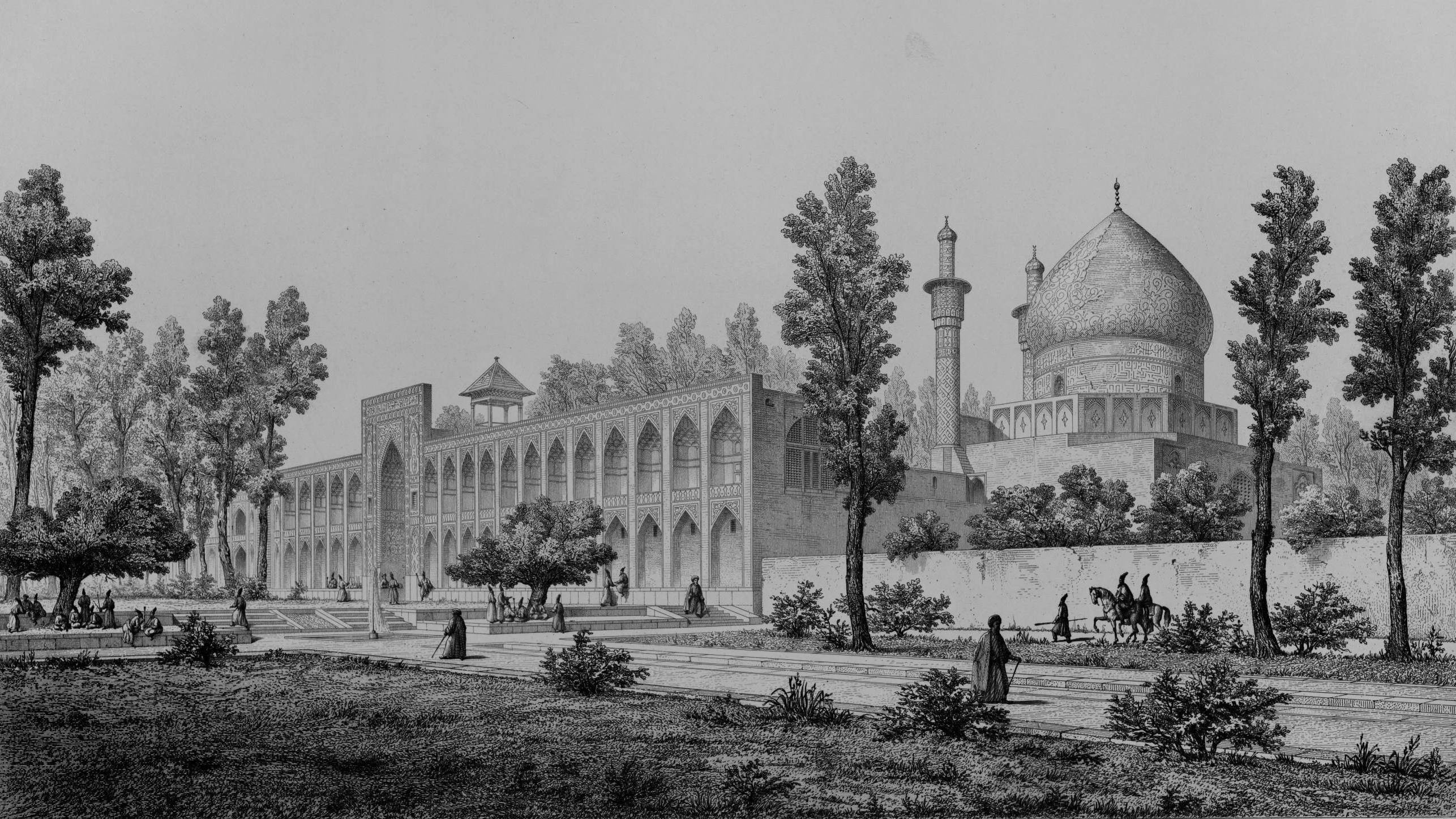
College of mother of Shah Sultan Hussein, Exterior

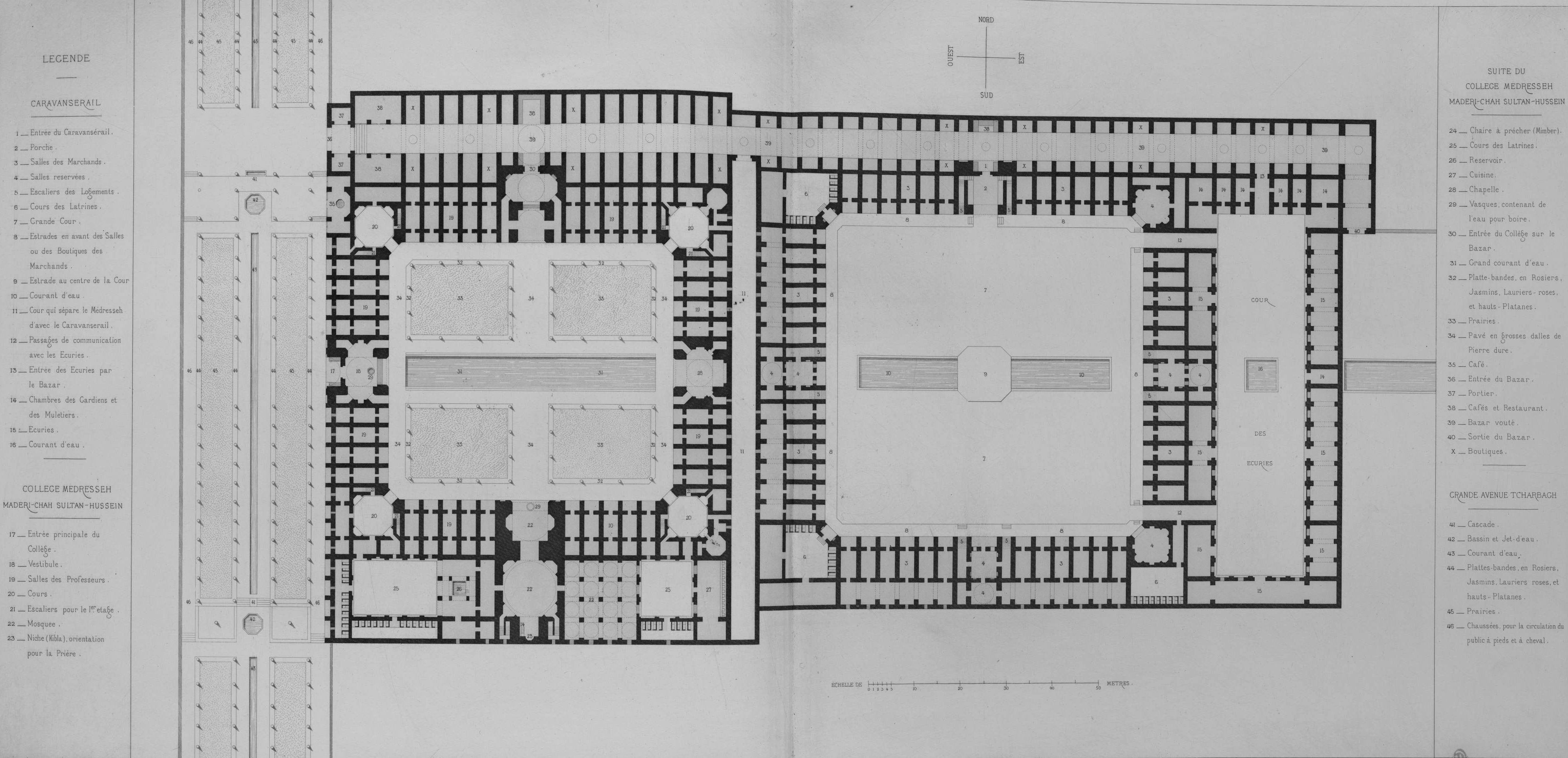
College of mother of Shah Sultan Hussein, Map

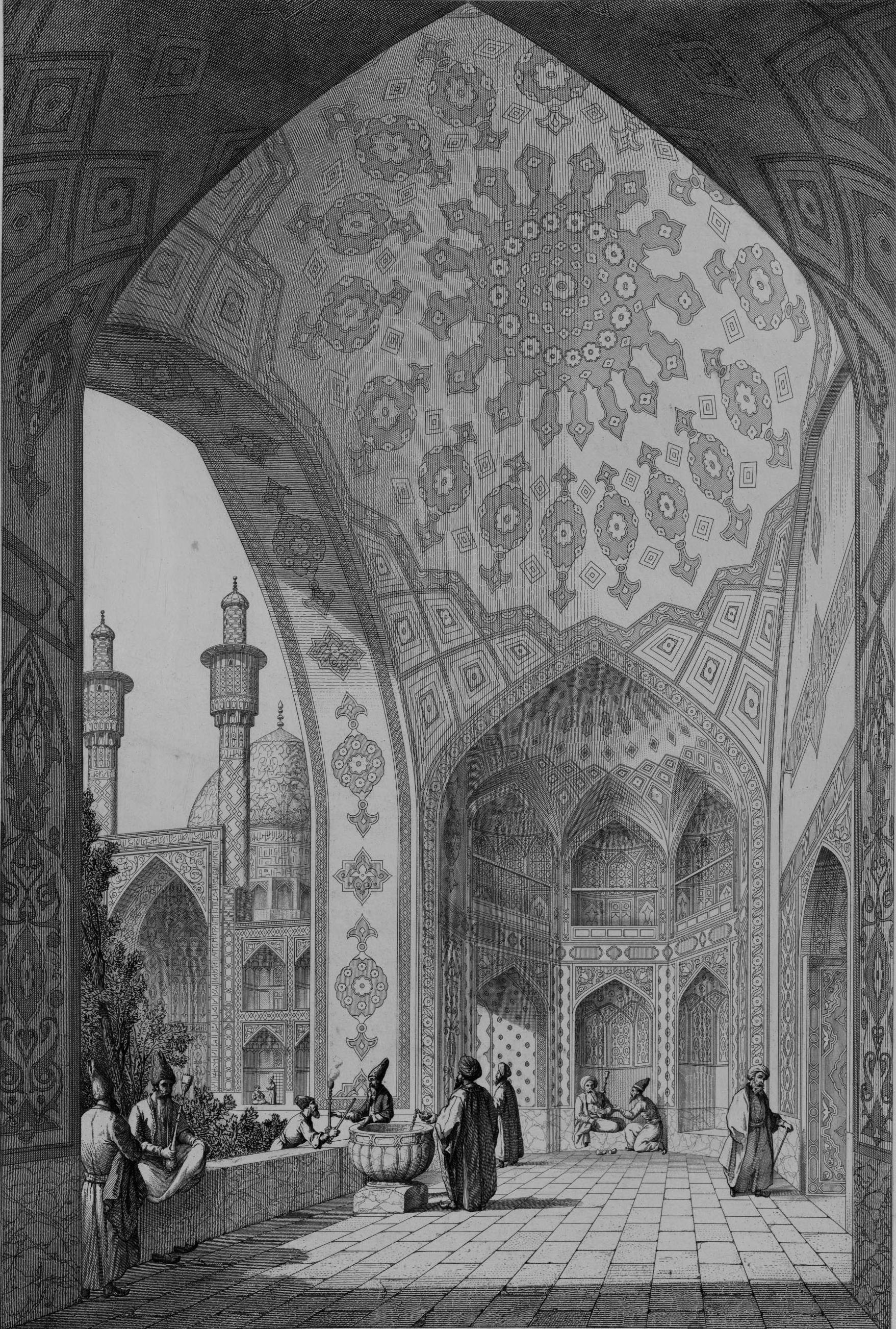
College of mother of Shah Sultan Hussein, Vestibule of the main entrance

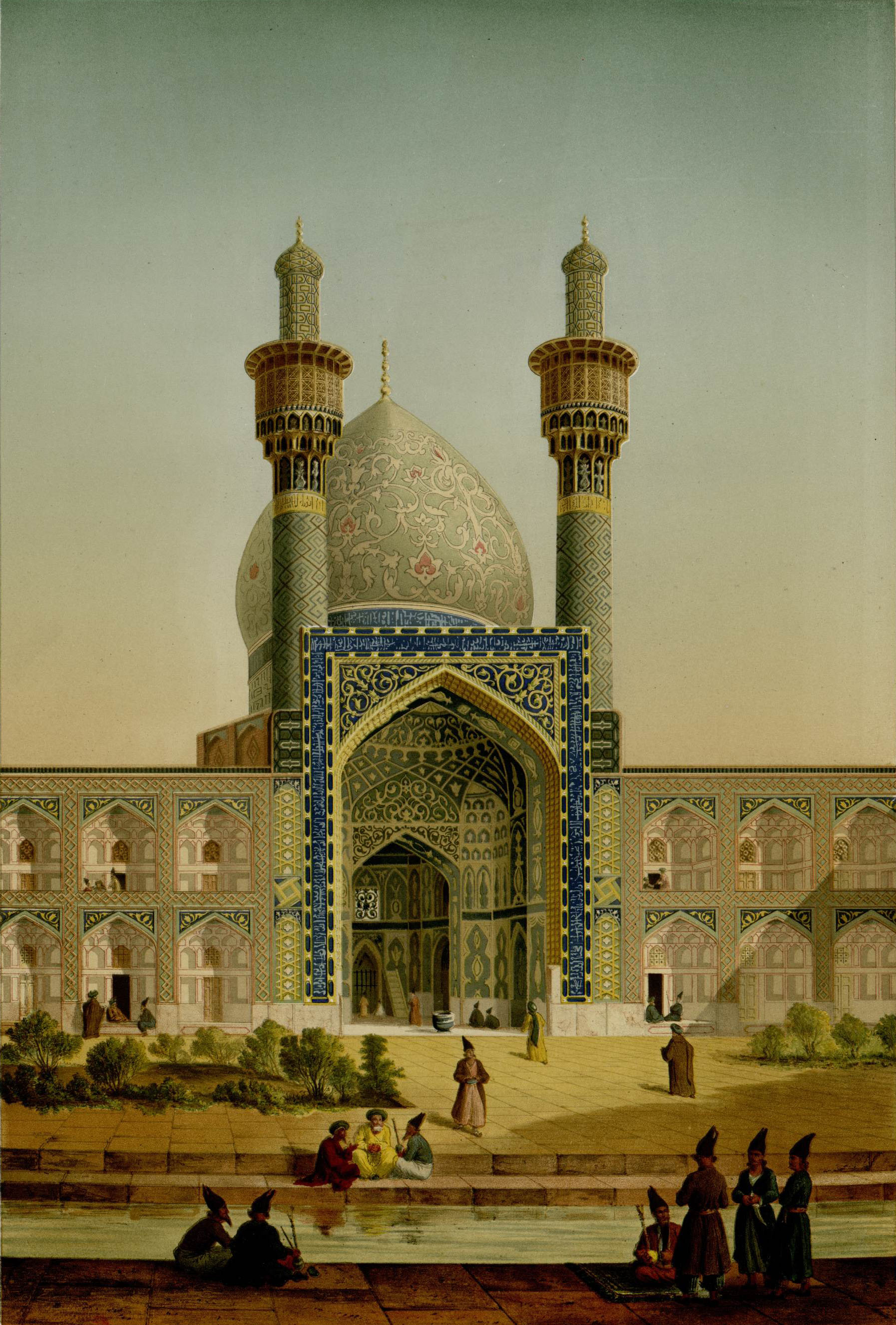
College of mother of Shah Sultan Hussein, Exterior

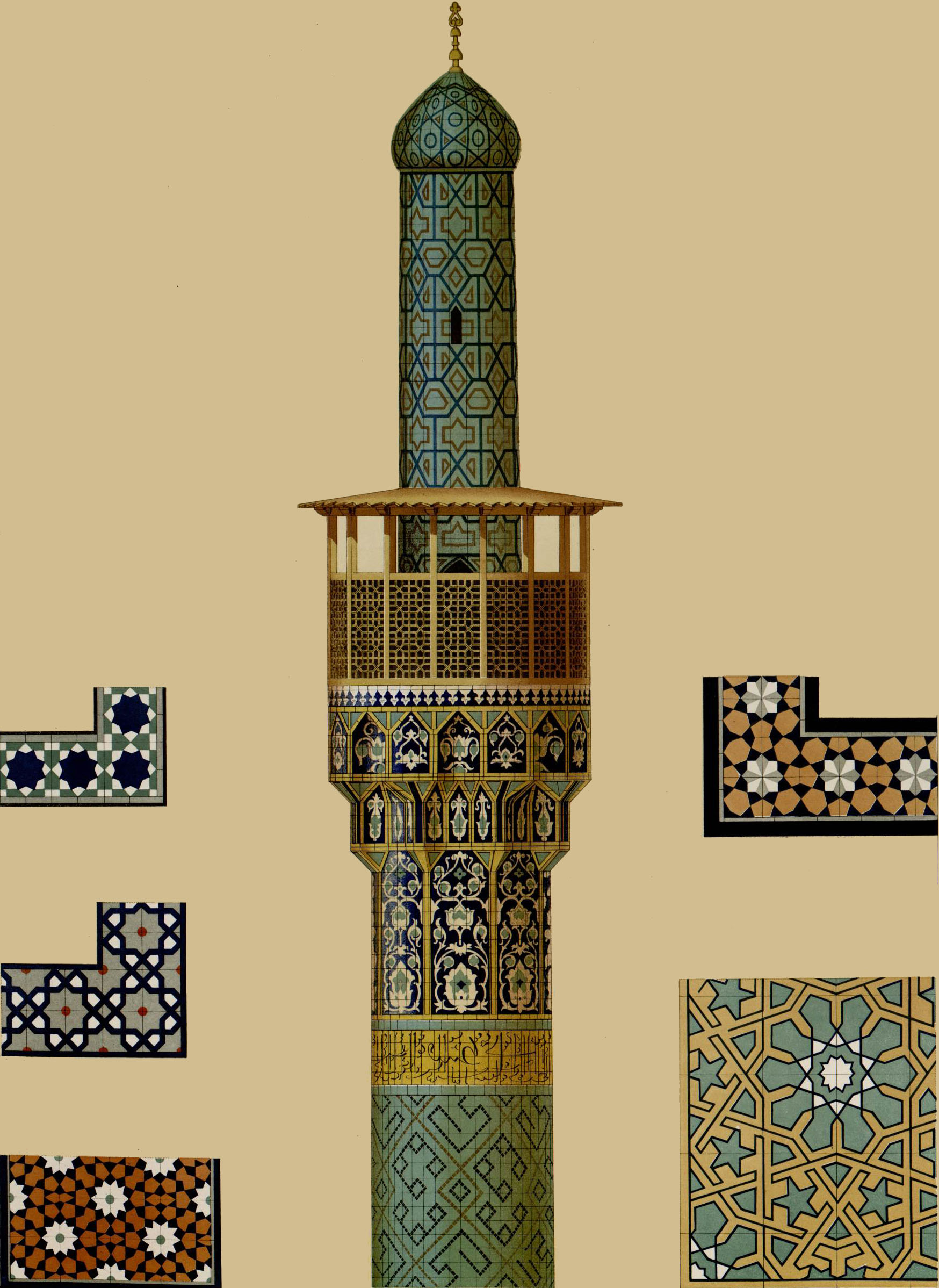
College of mother of Shah Sultan Hussein, minaret and details

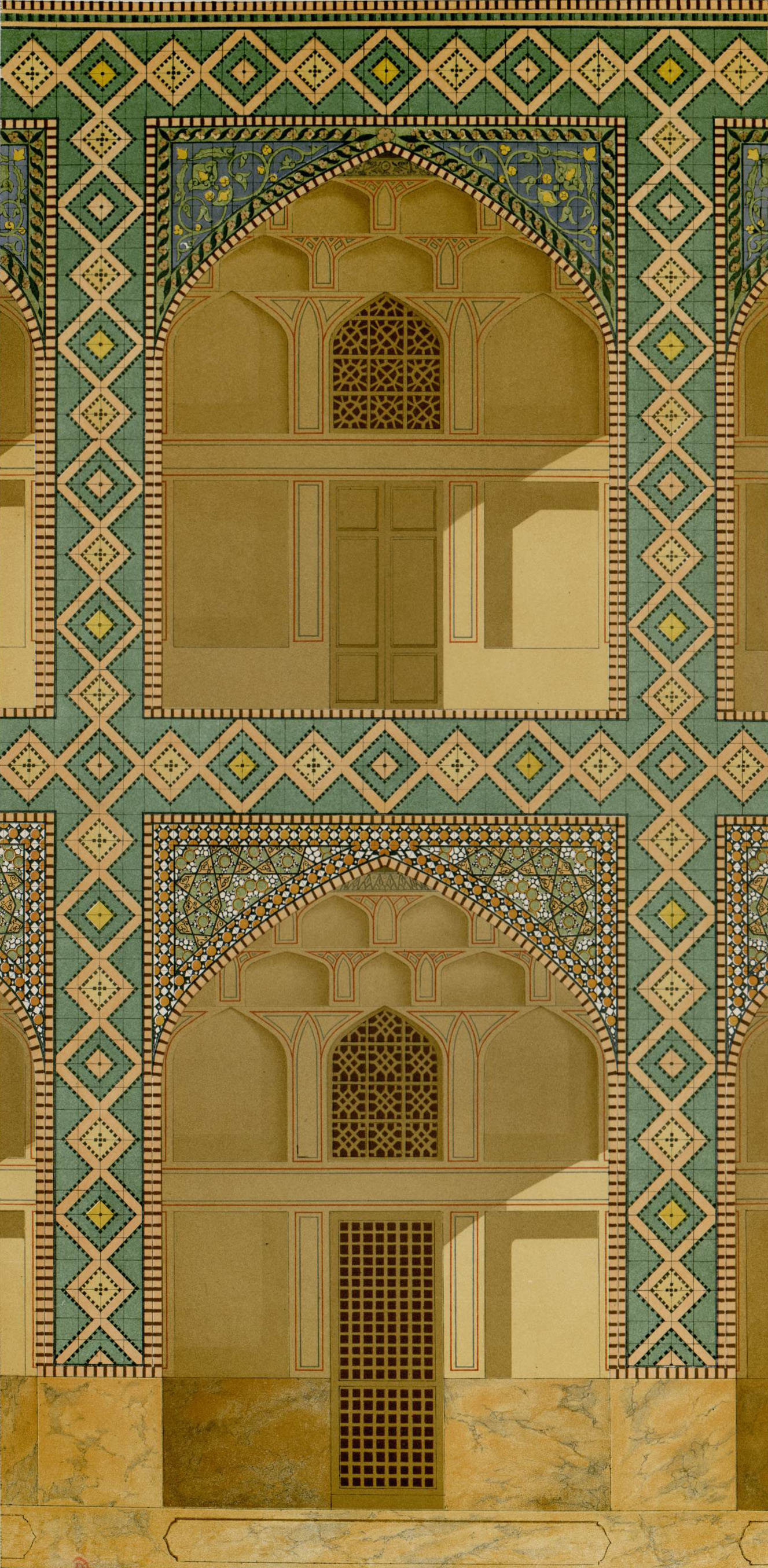
College of mother of Shah Sultan Hussein, Detail of the arches of the courtyard

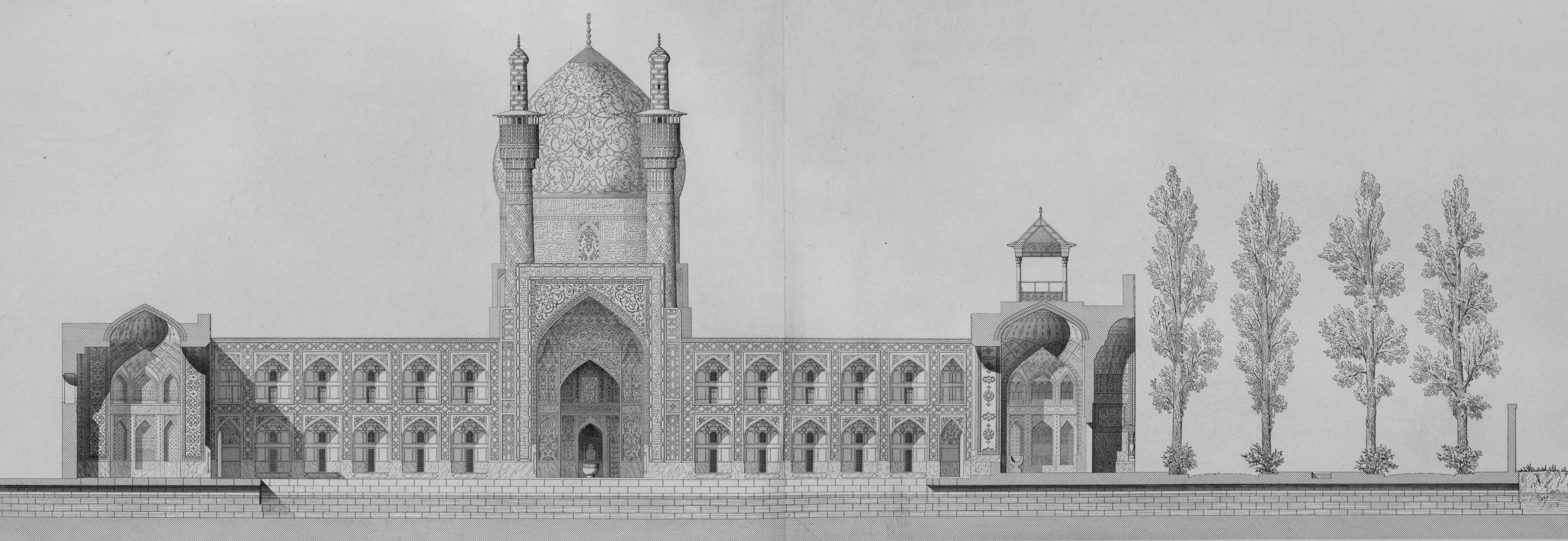
College of mother of Shah Sultan Hussein, Cup

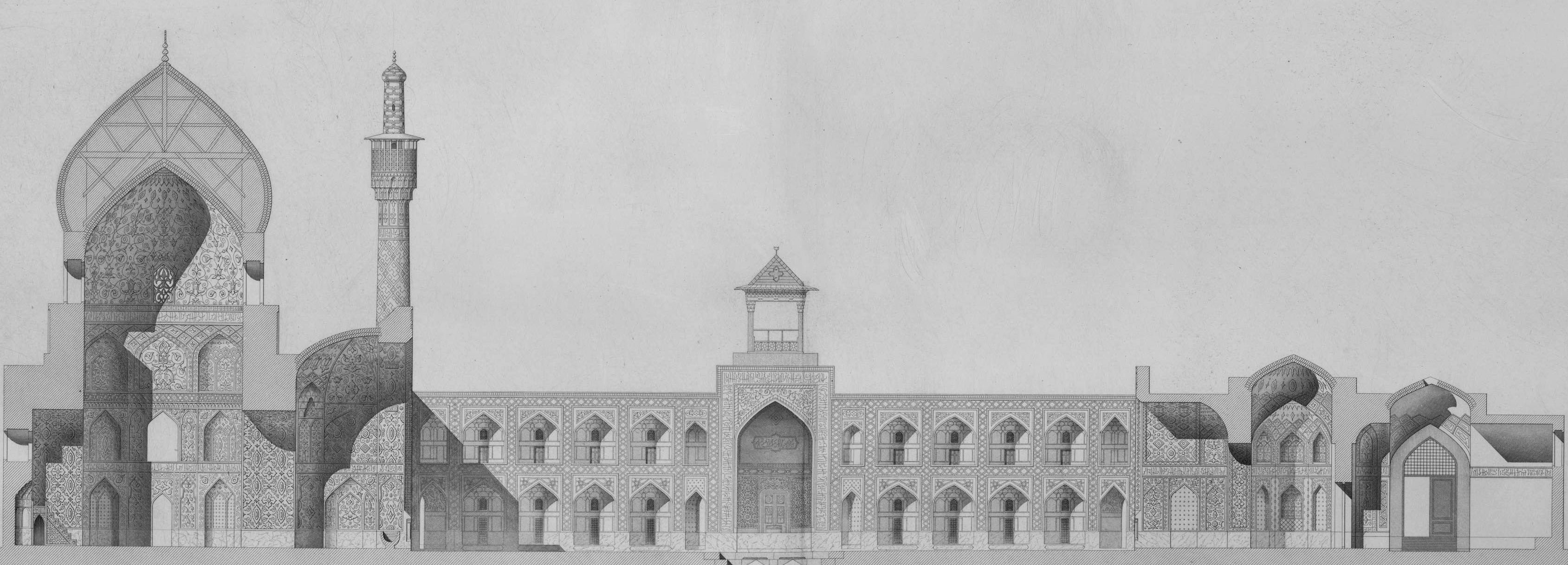
College of mother of Shah Sultan Hussein, Cup

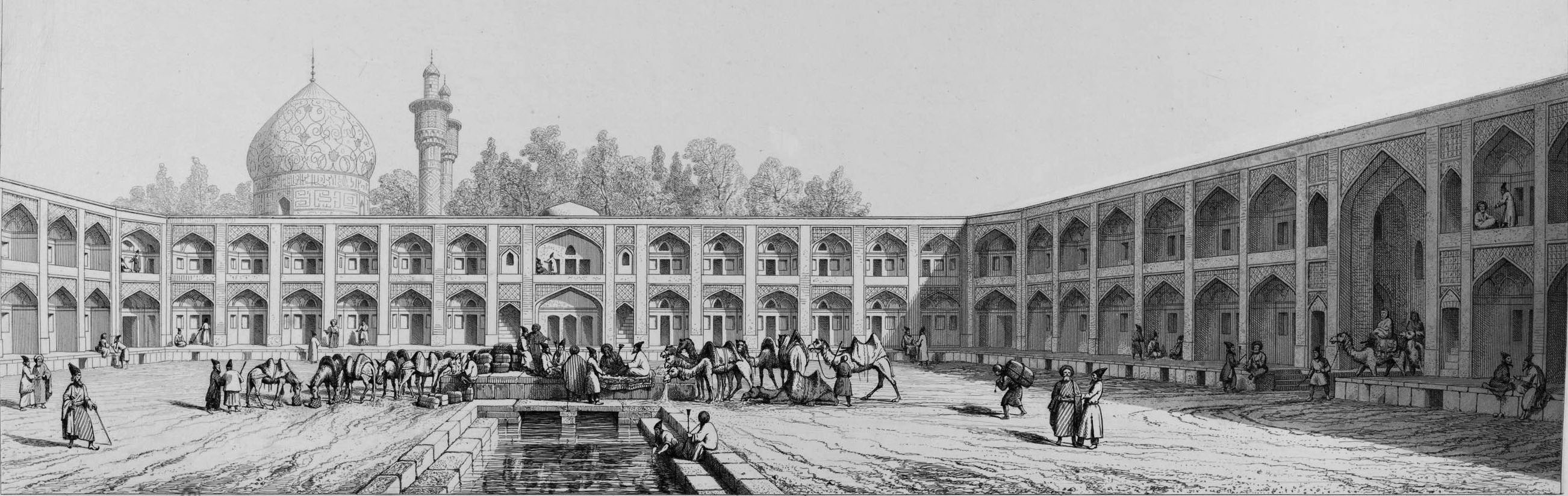
Caravanserai of mother of Shah Sultan Hussein (currently Abbasi Hotel),

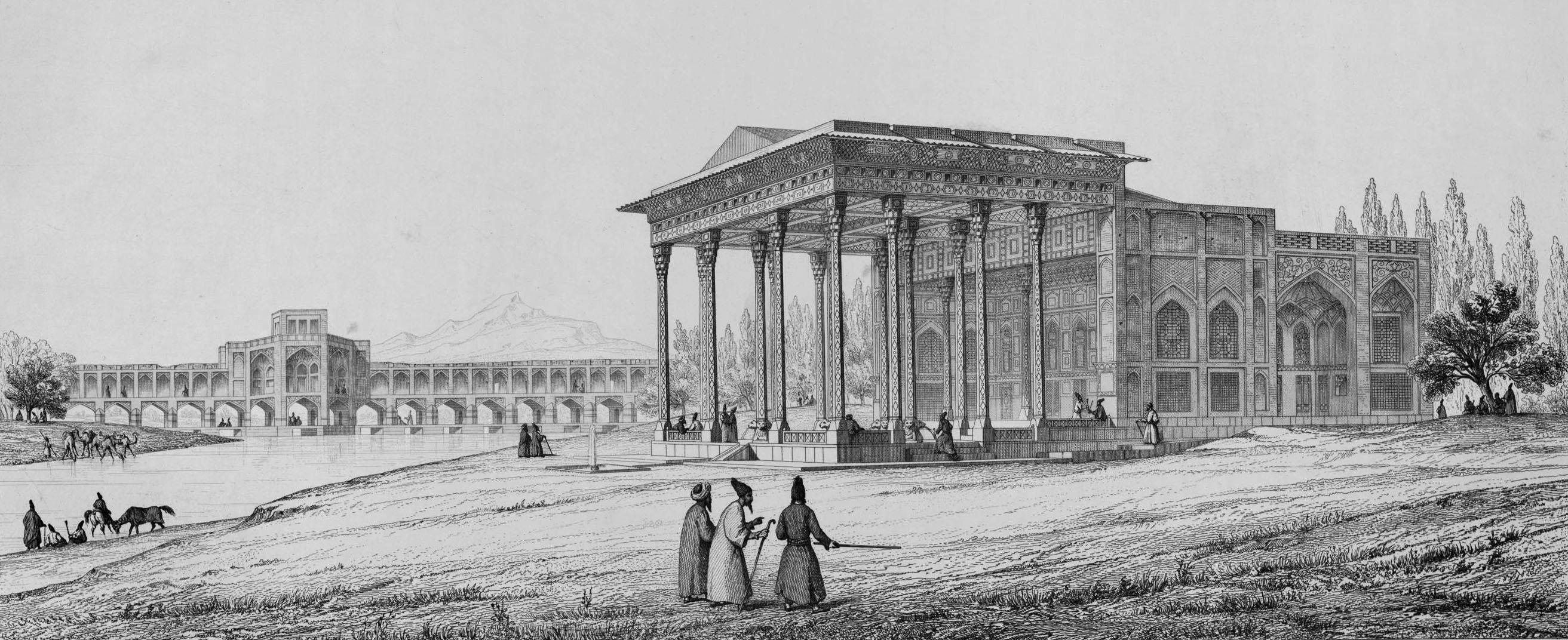
Pavillon of Aynekhane (House of mirrors), outside perspective

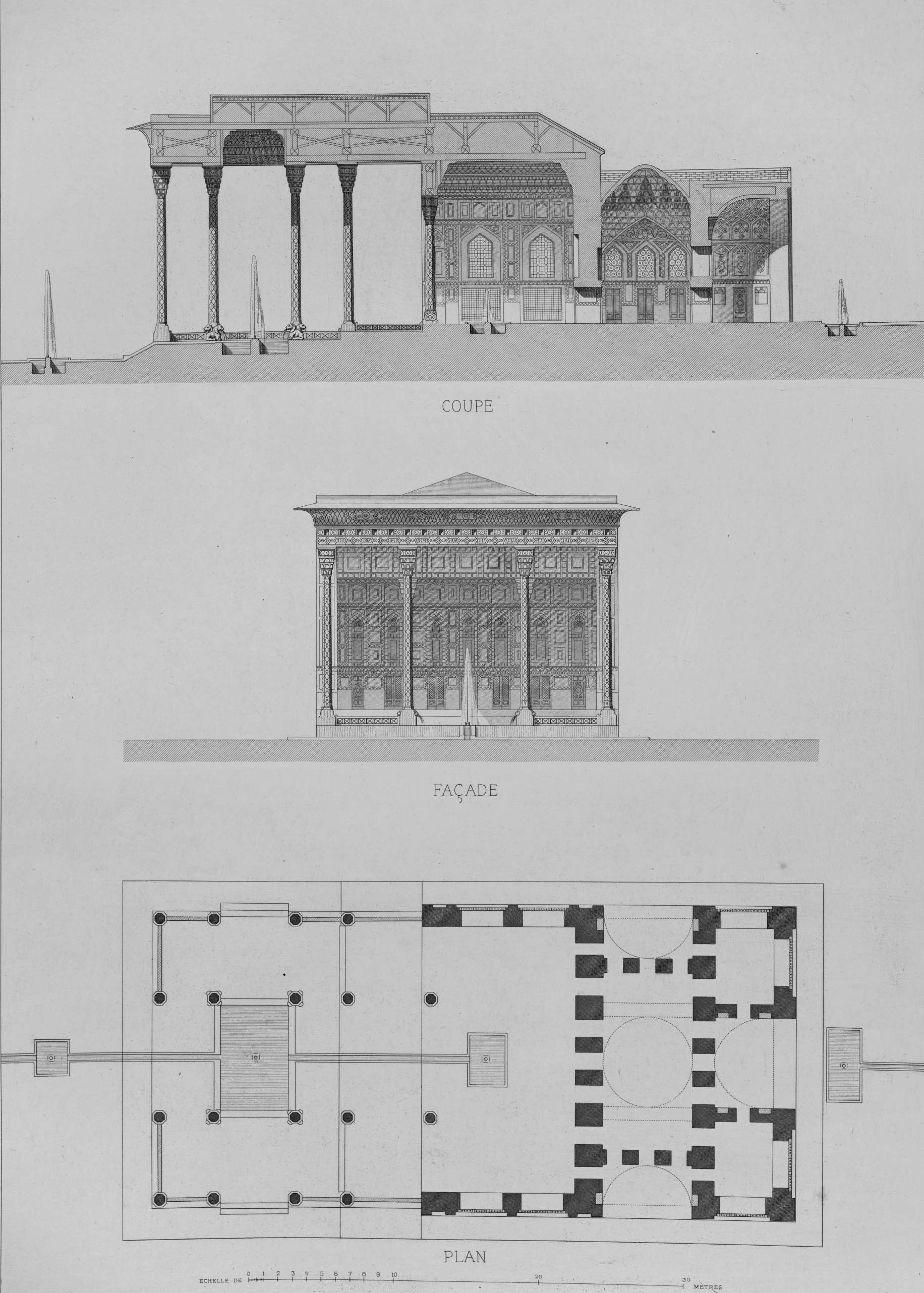
Pavillon of Aynekhane (House of mirrors), Cup ; Bezel ; Plan

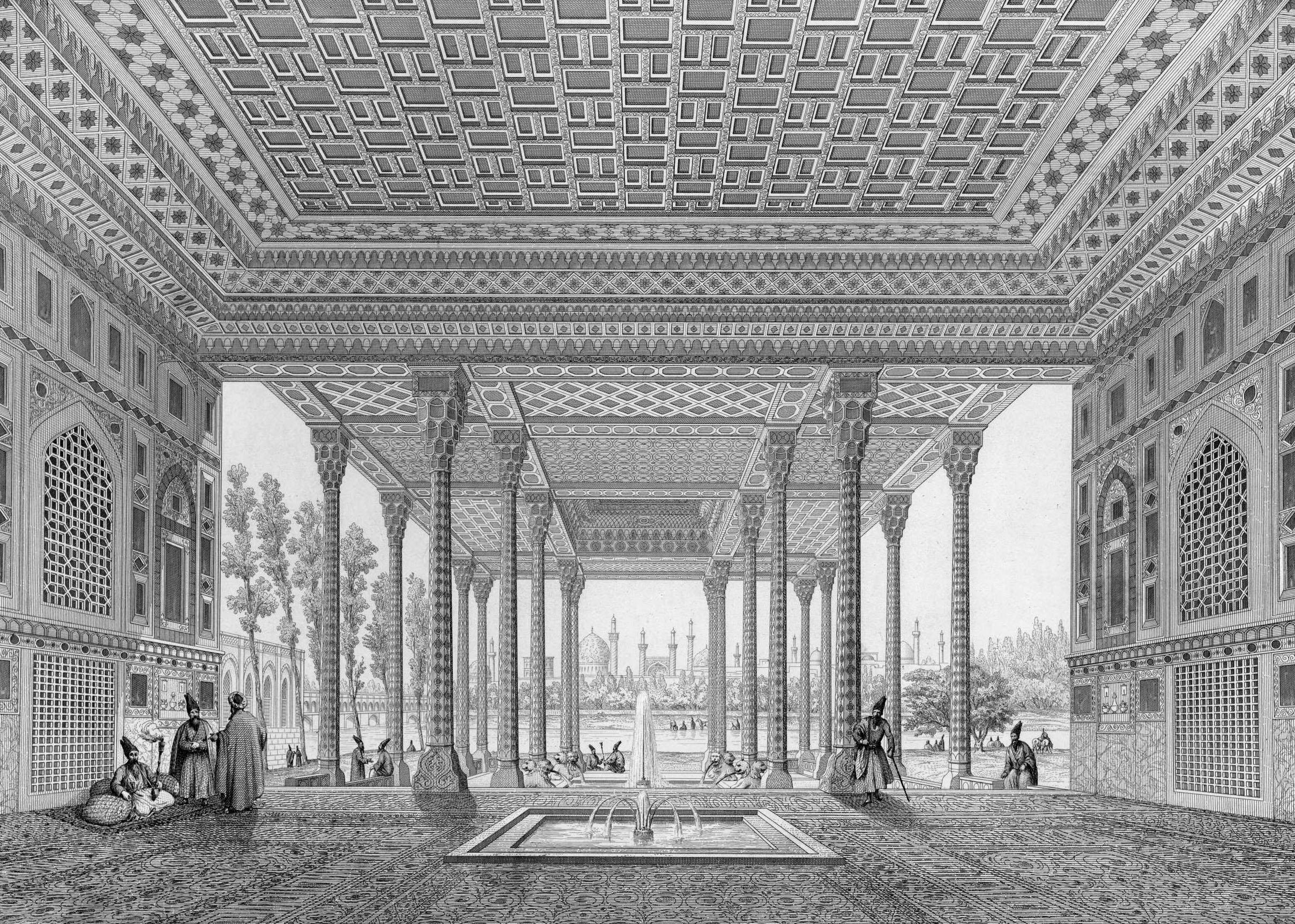
Pavillon of Aynekhane (House of mirrors), interior view perspective

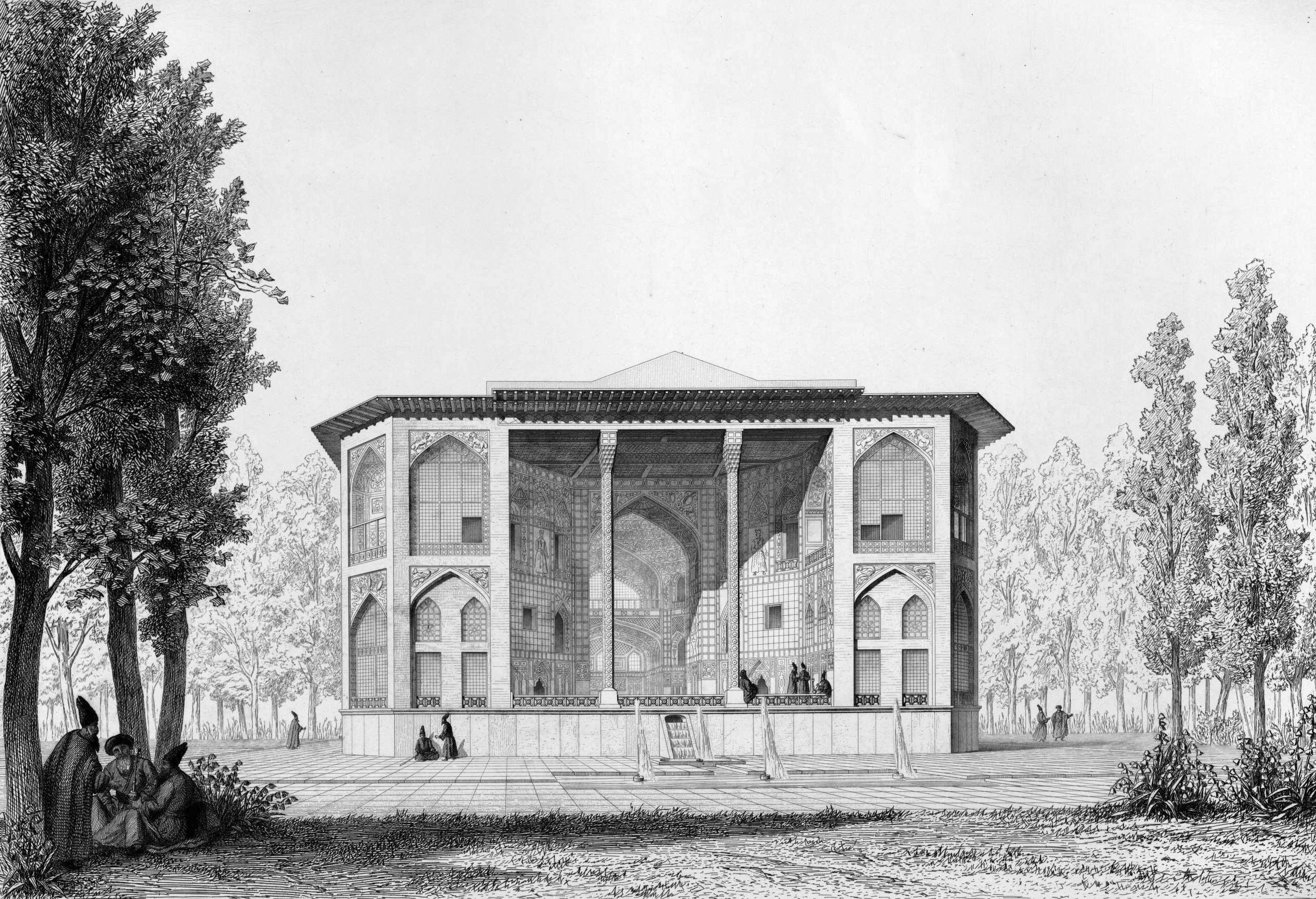
Pavillon of Eight Paradise (Hasht Behesht), Outside perspective

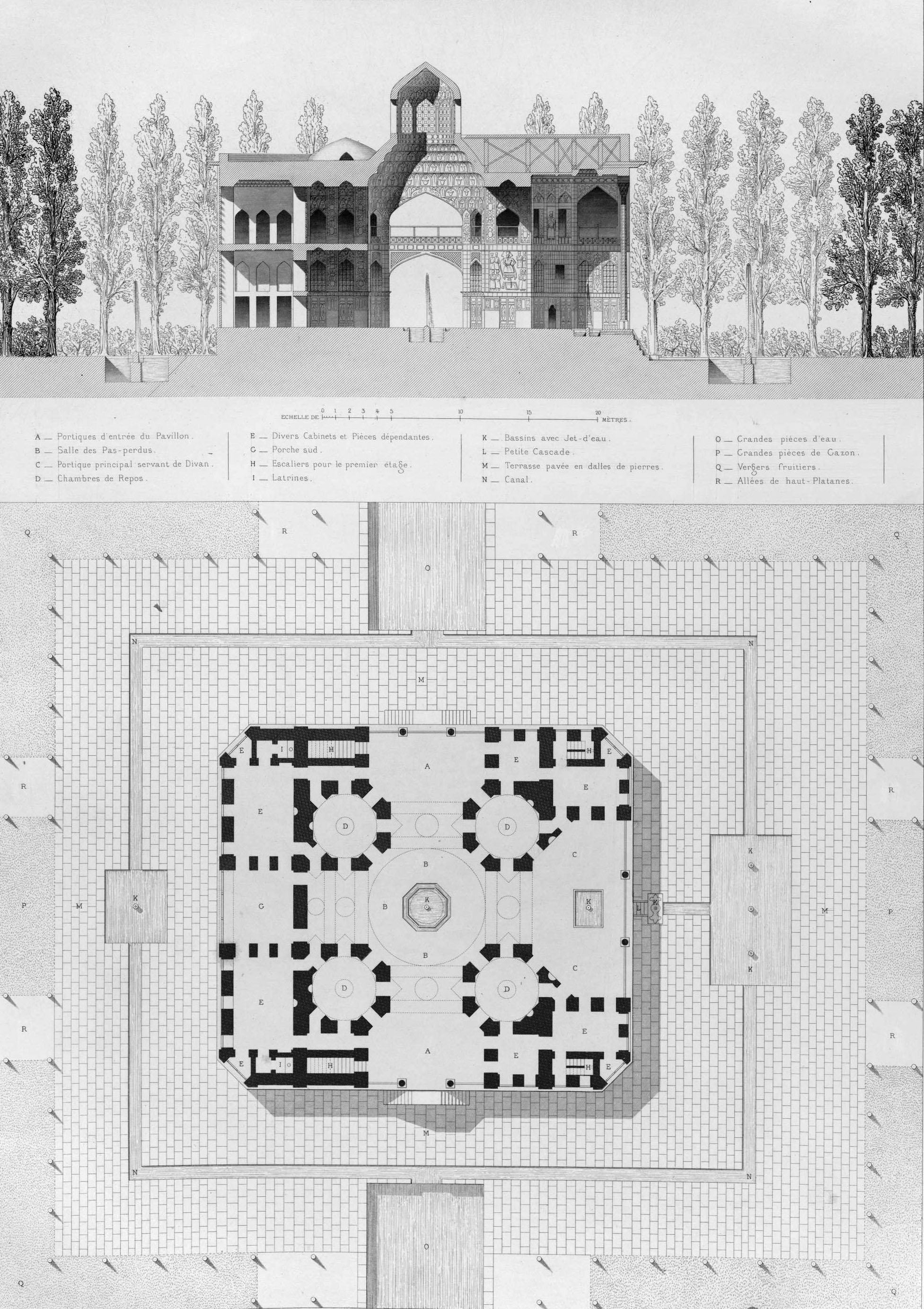
Pavillon of Eight Paradise (Hasht Behesht), Plan and section

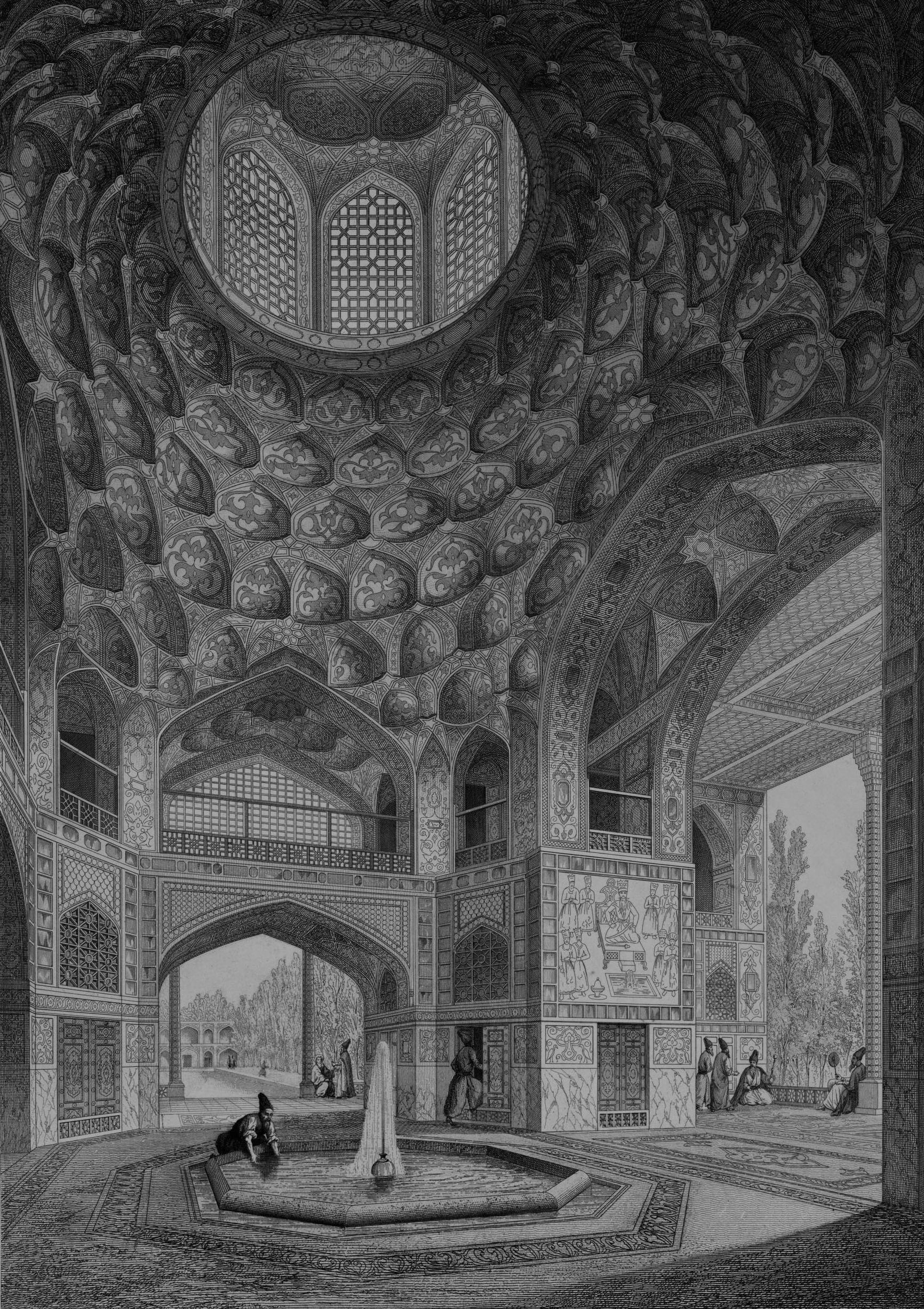
Pavillon of Eight Paradise (Hasht Behesht), Interior Perspective

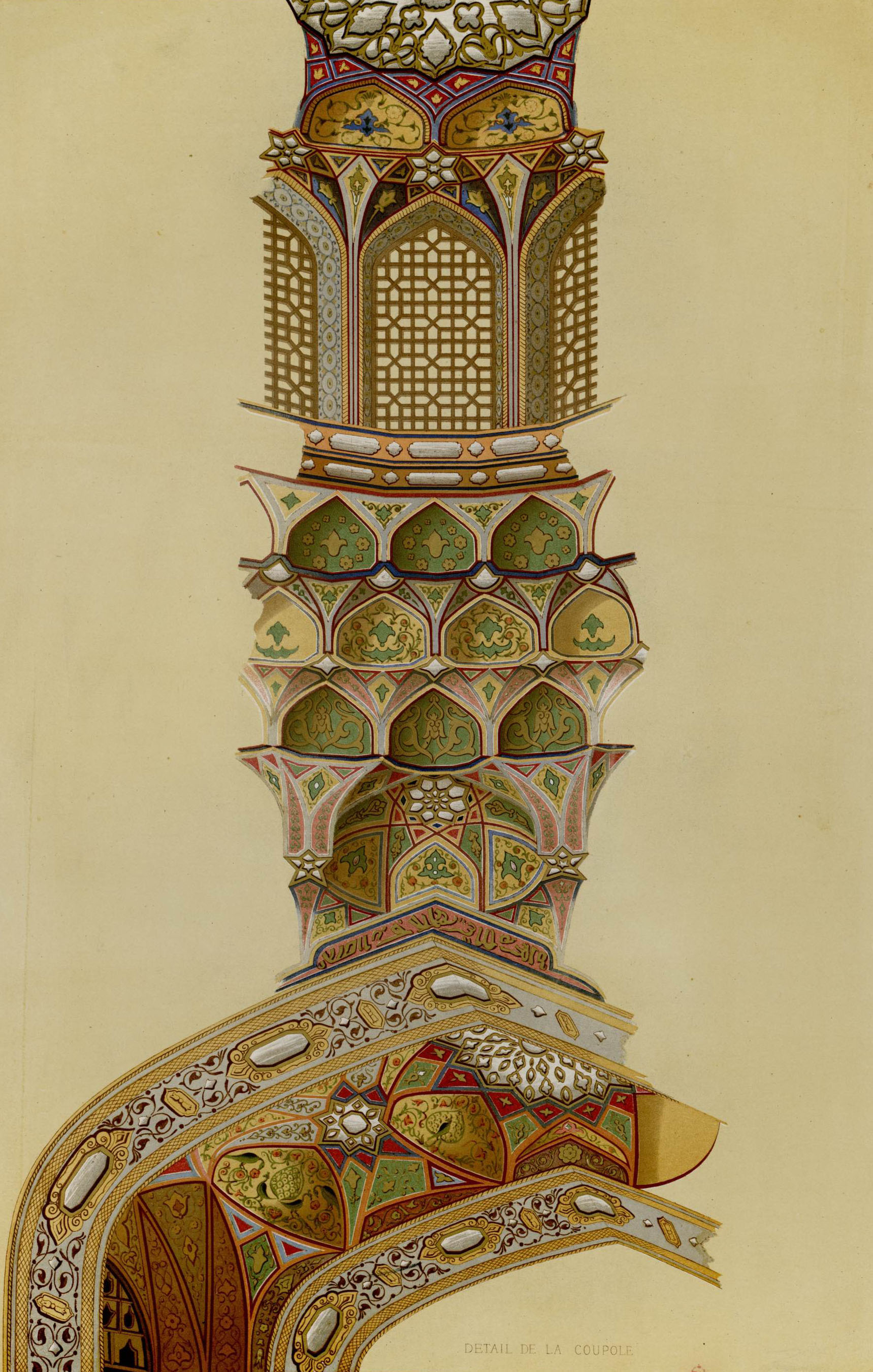
Pavillon of Eight Paradise (Hasht Behesht), Detail of the dome

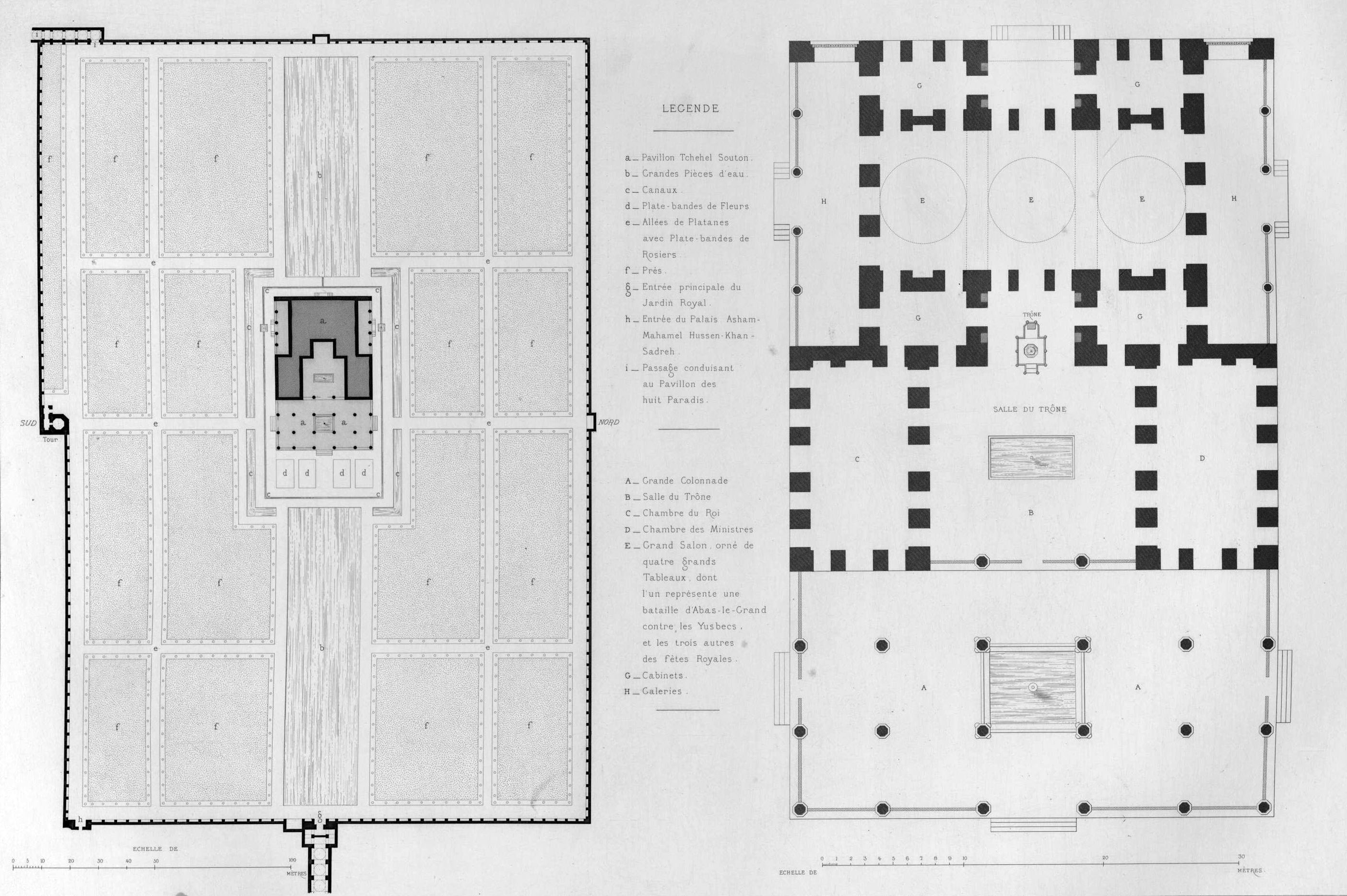
Garden and pavilion Chehel Sotoun (40 columns), map

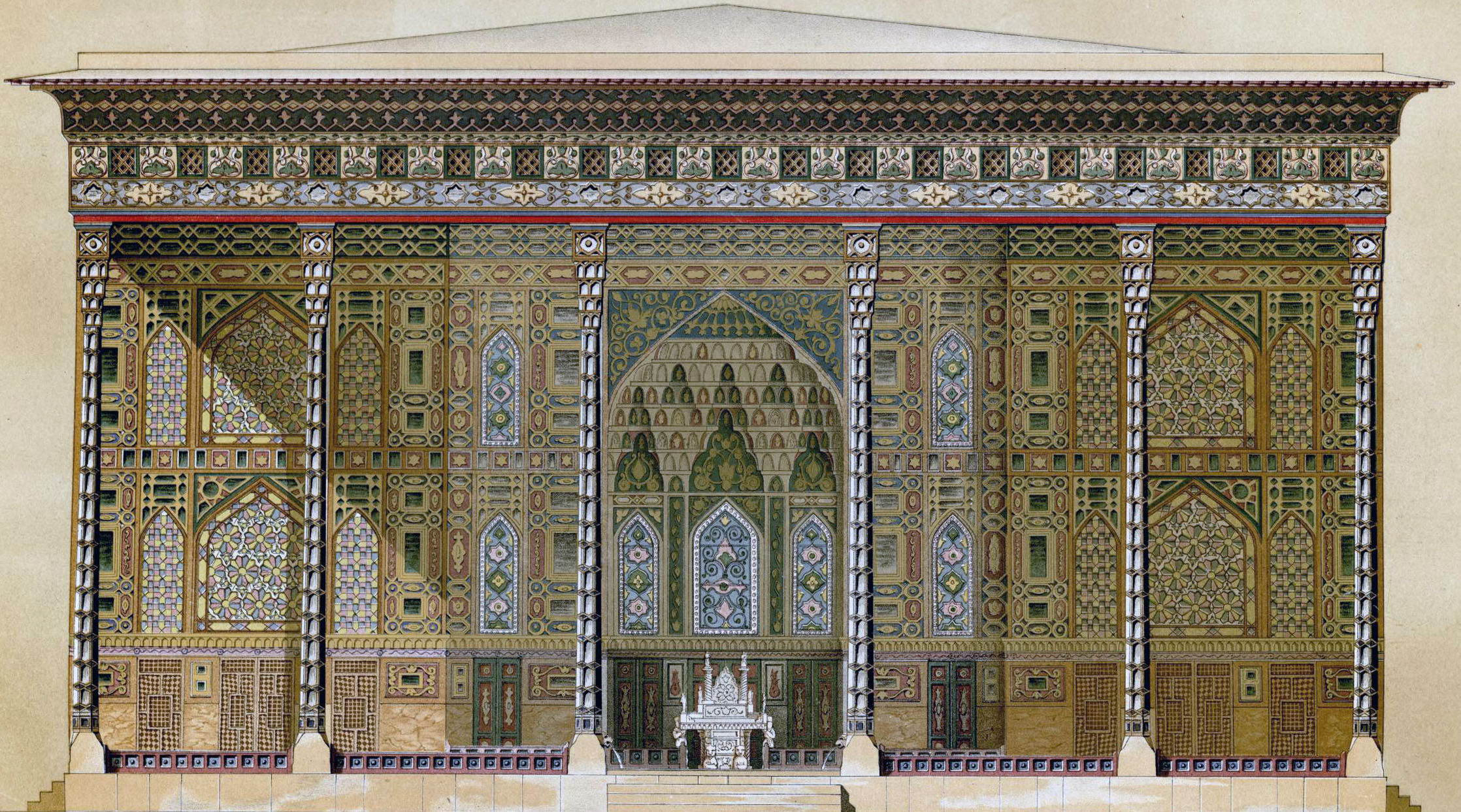
Garden and pavilion Chehel Sotoun (40 columns), Facade

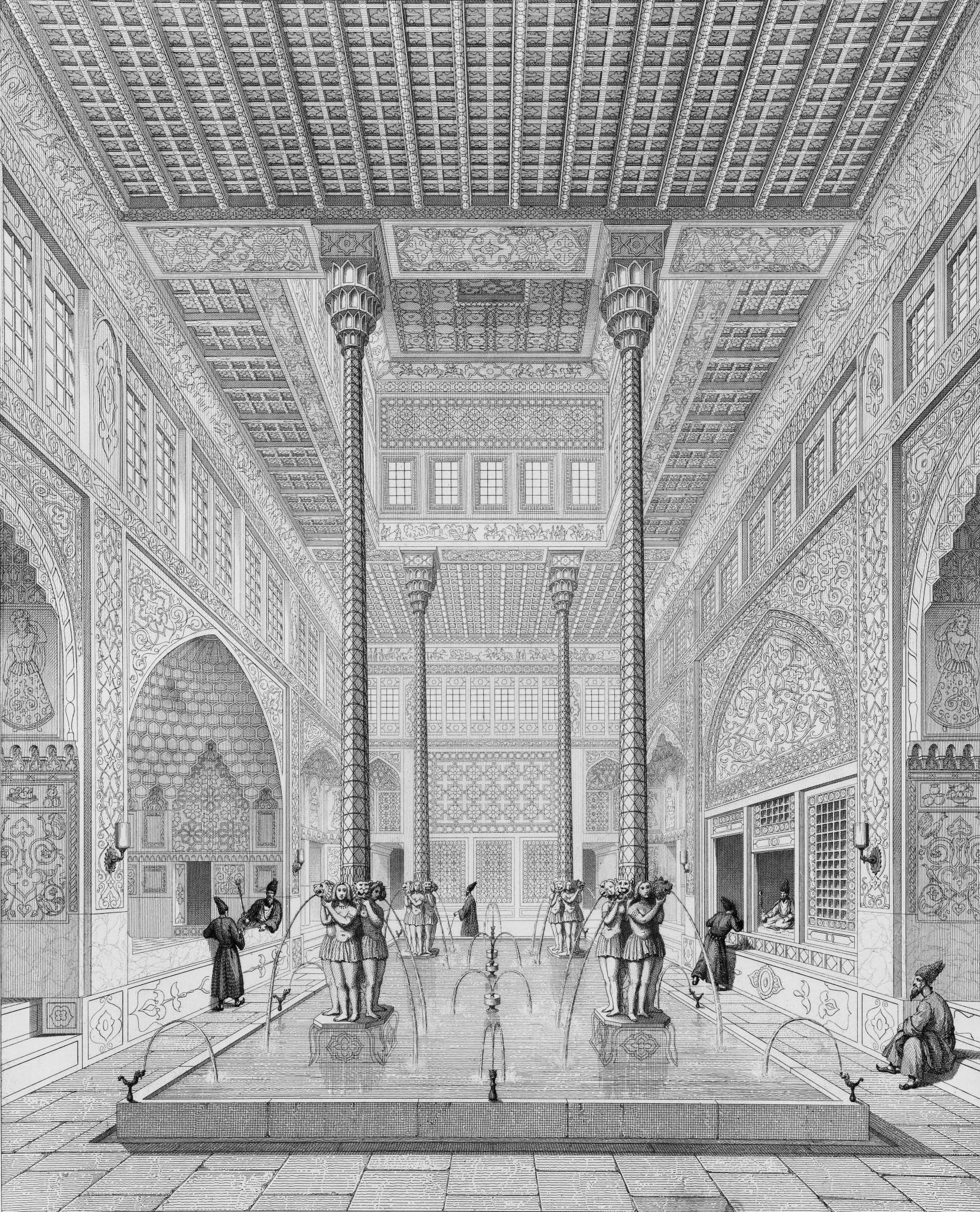
Inside the palace Char Bagh (Chehel Sotoun area)

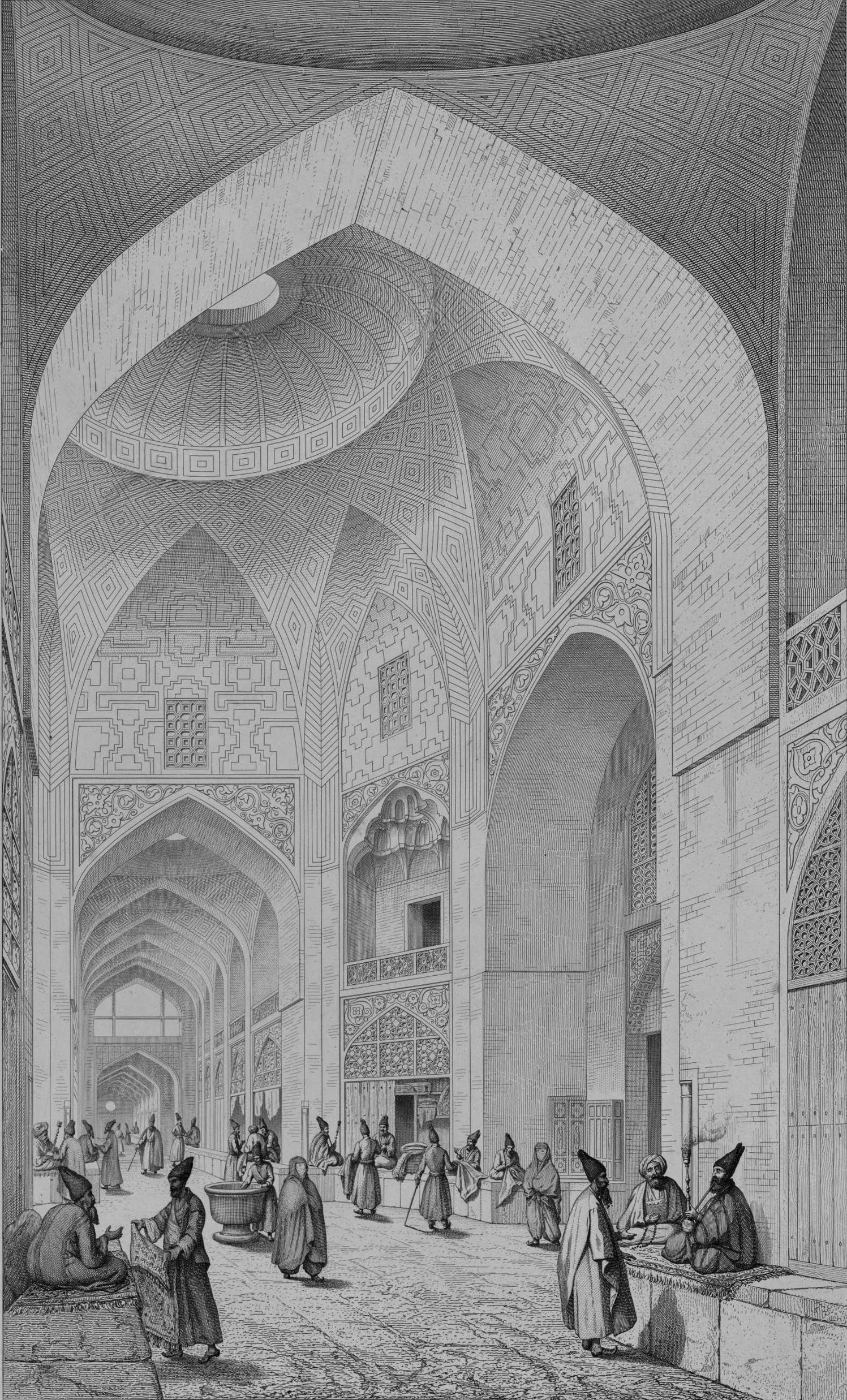
Bazar tailors (Chehel Sotoun area)

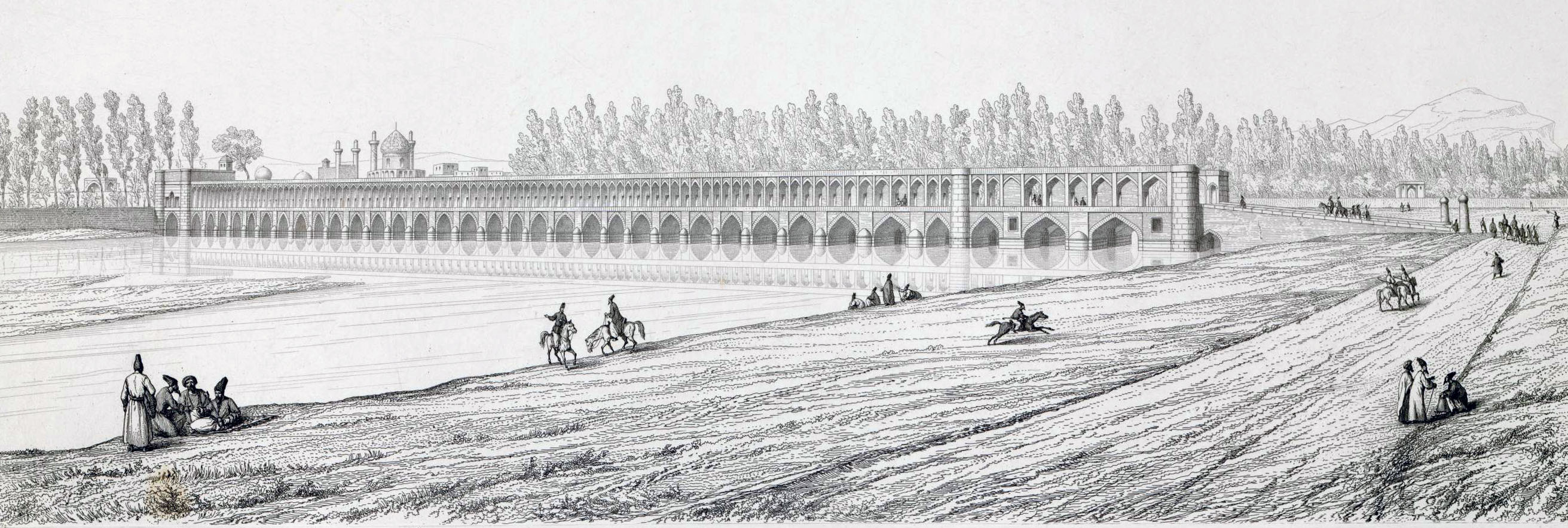
Allahverdi Khan Bridge, great perspective view

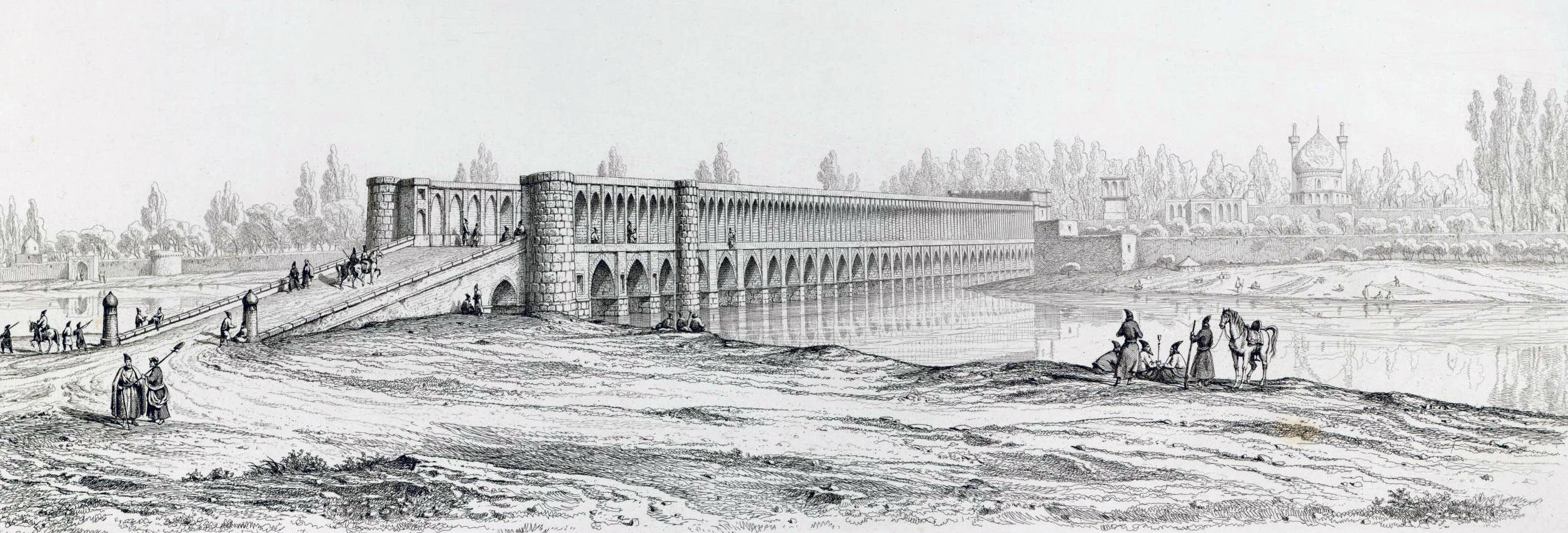
Allahverdi Khan Bridge, great perspective view 2

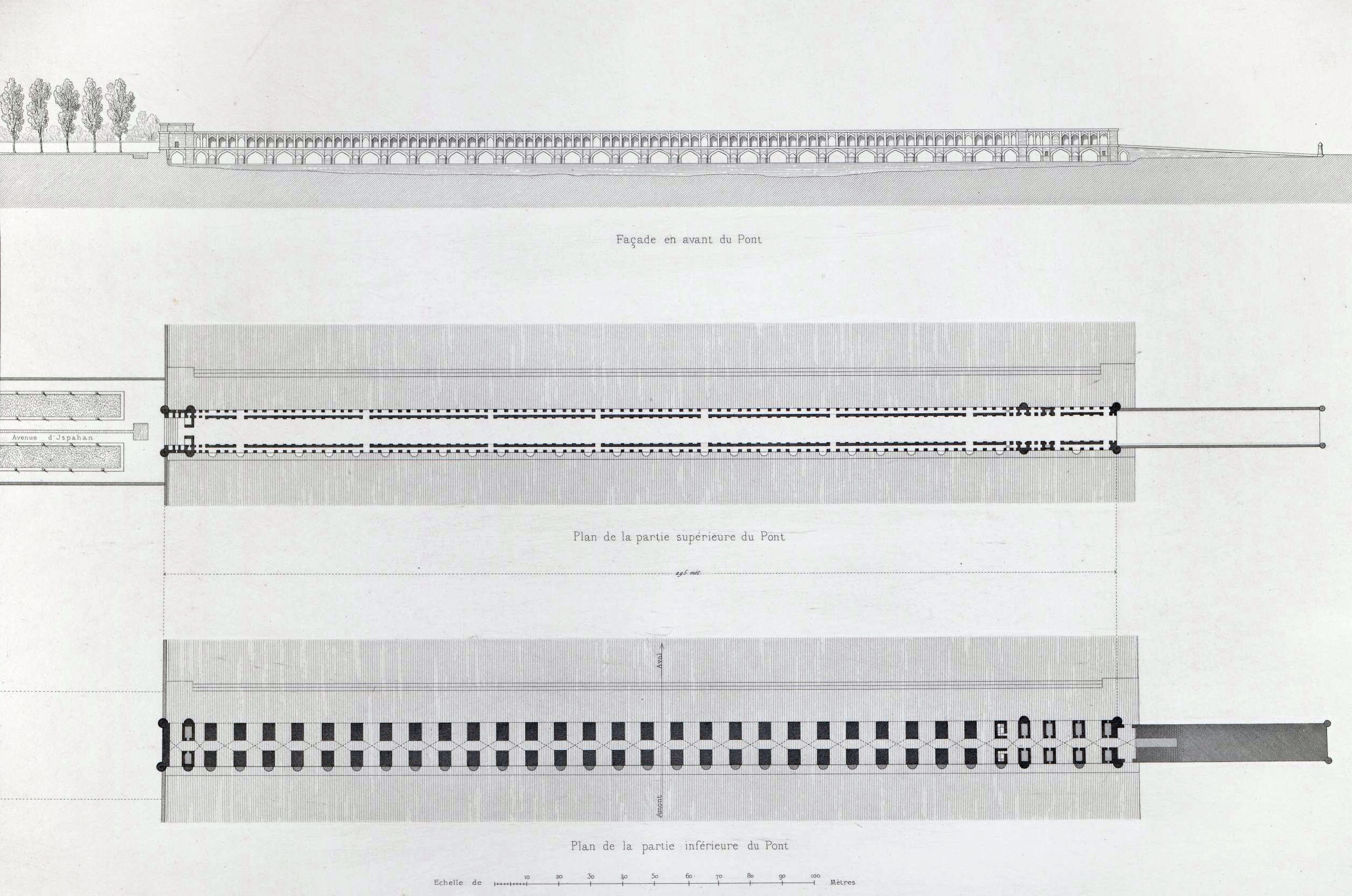
Allahverdi Khan Bridge, Plans

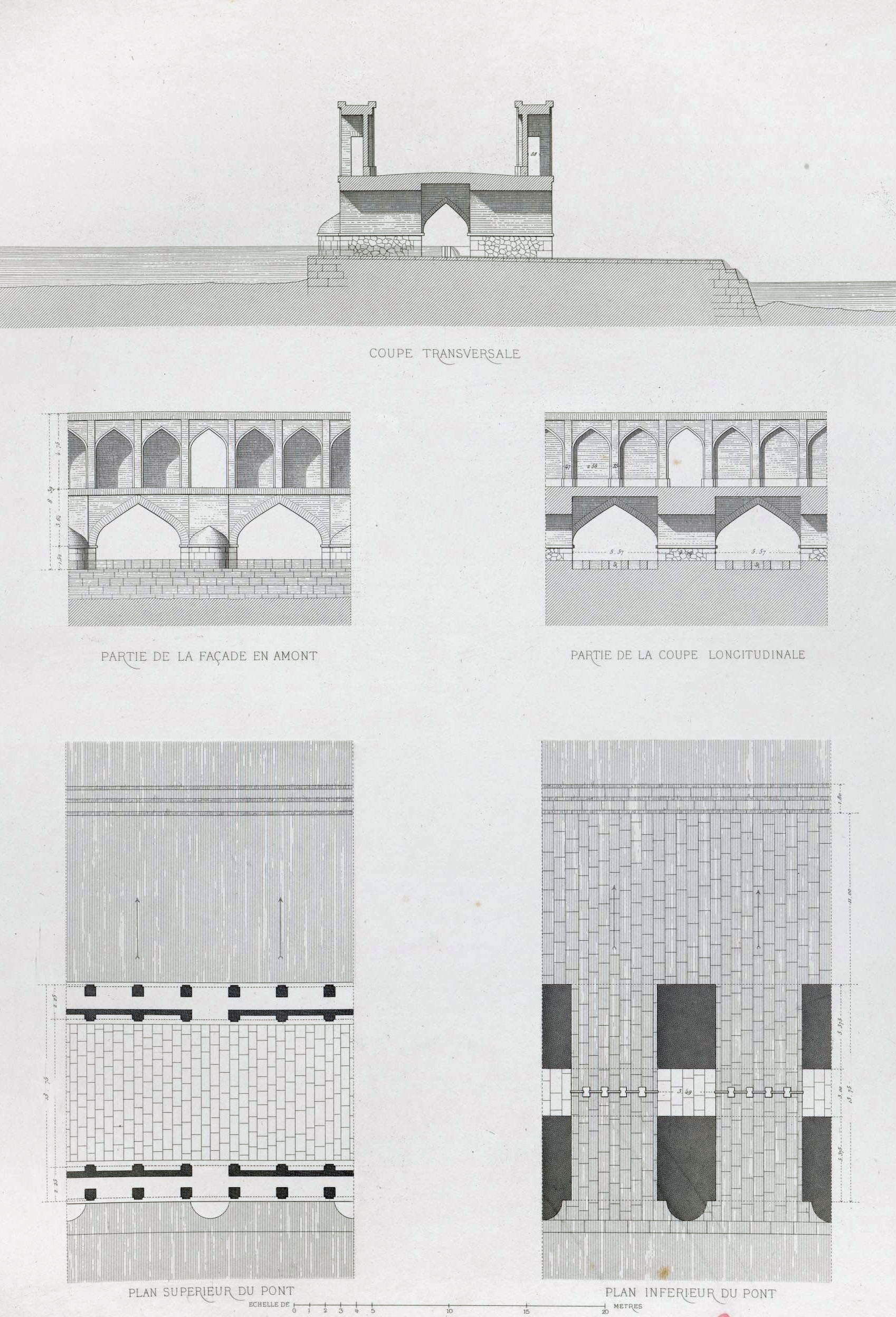
Allahverdi Khan Bridge, cup, various details

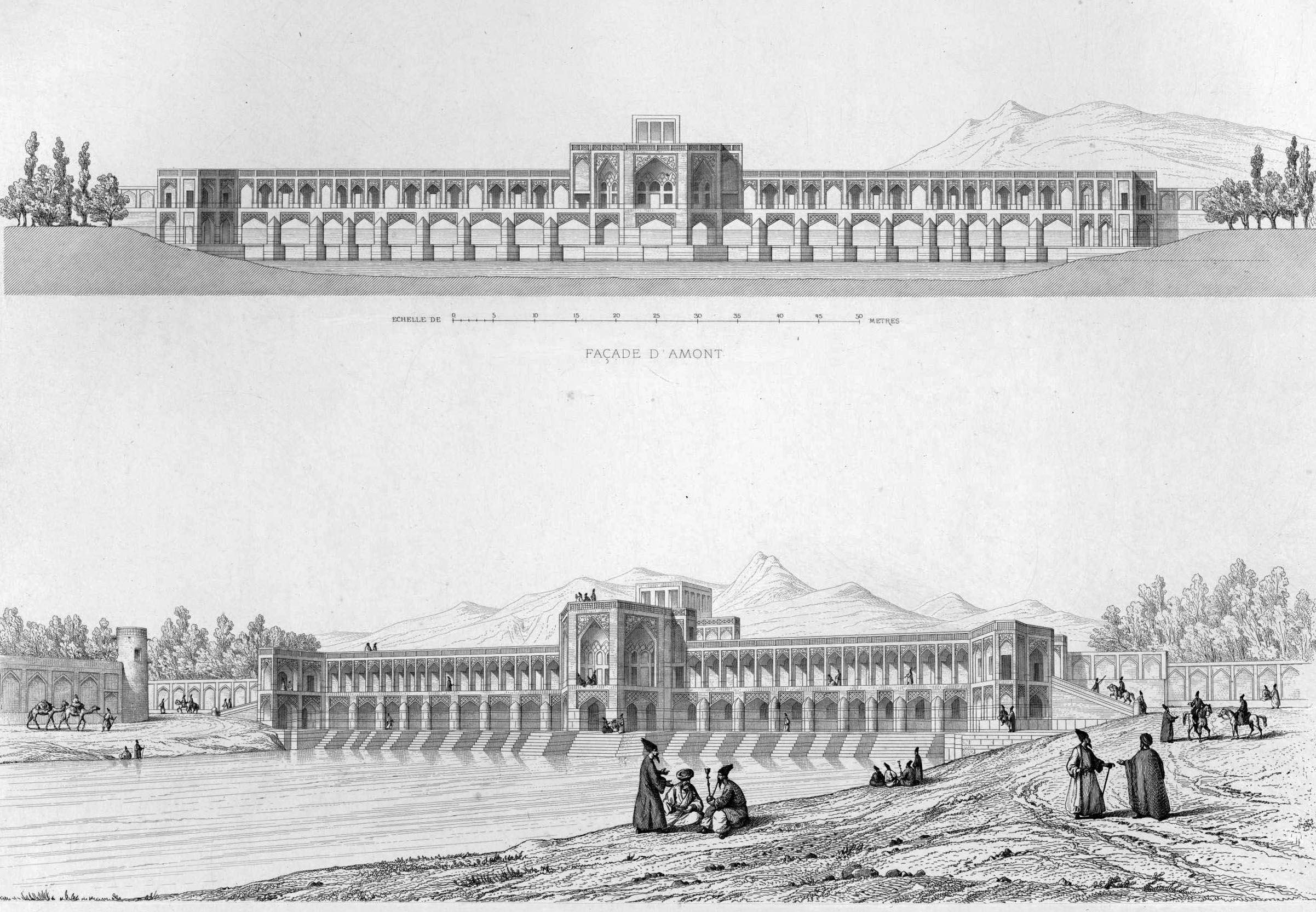
Hassan Beik (Khaju) bridge, Facades

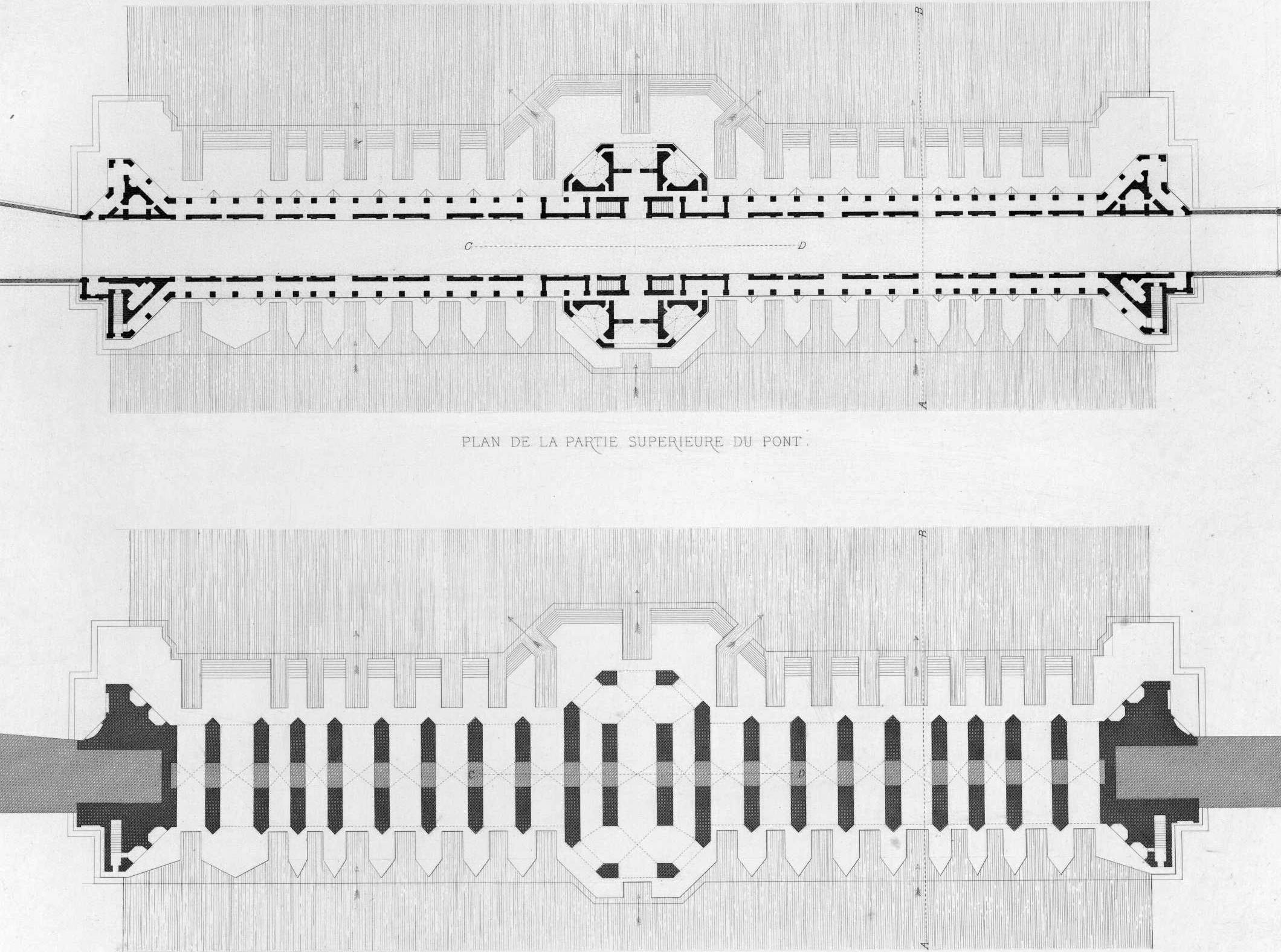
Planes of the upper and lower portions of Hassan Beik (Khaju)

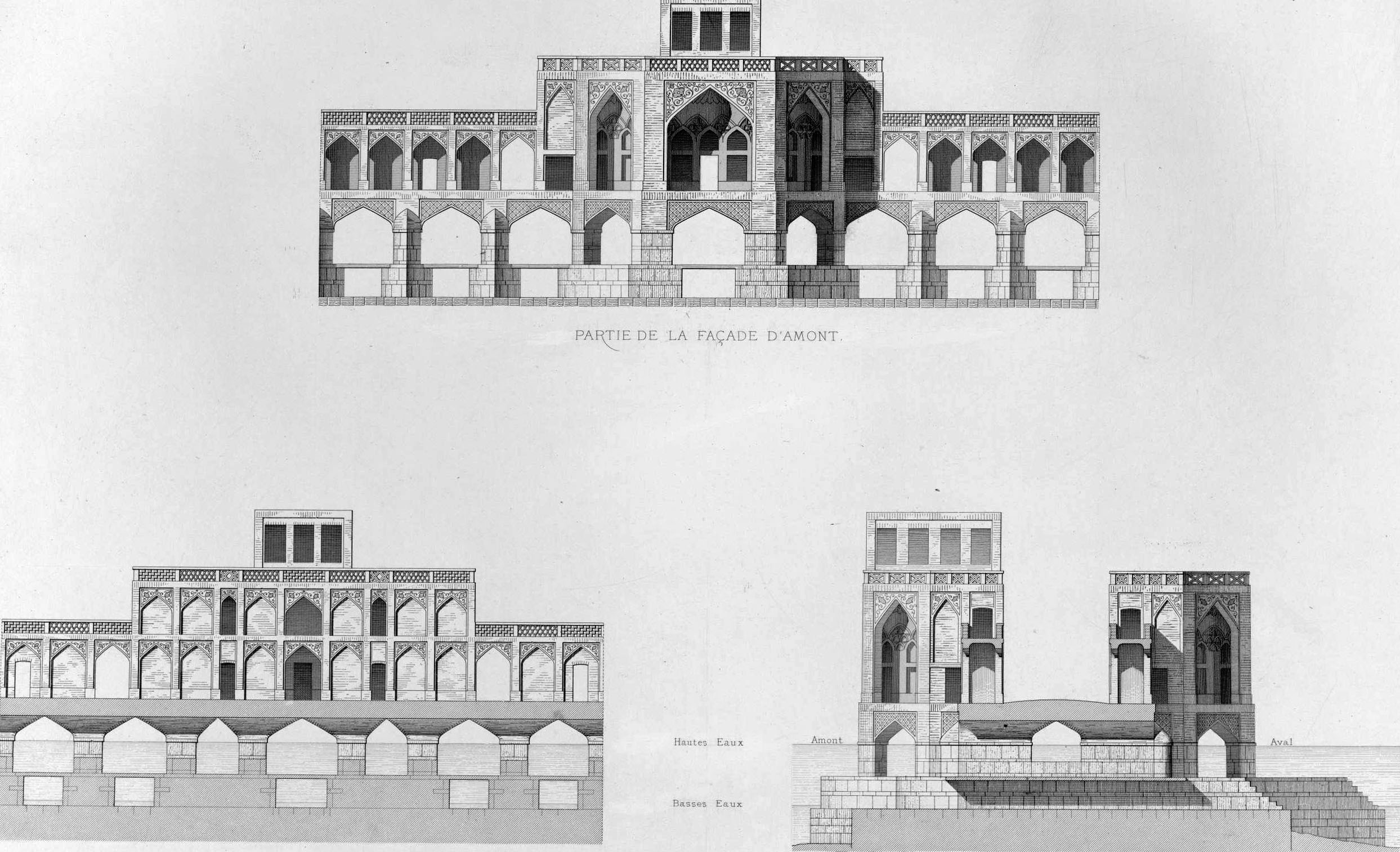
Hassan Beik (Khaju), Part of the facade of upstream ; Cups

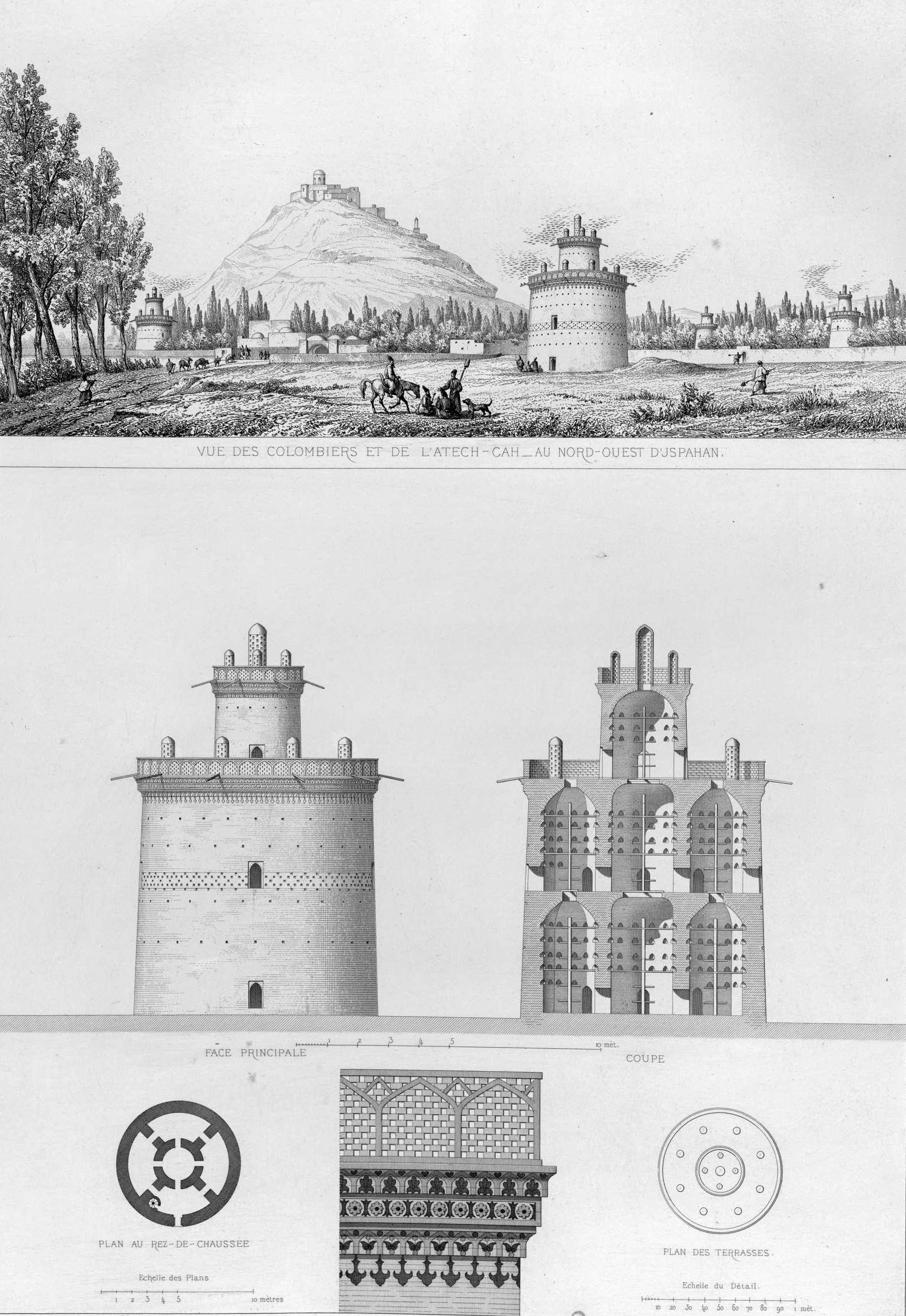
Details of a dovecote, Isfahan

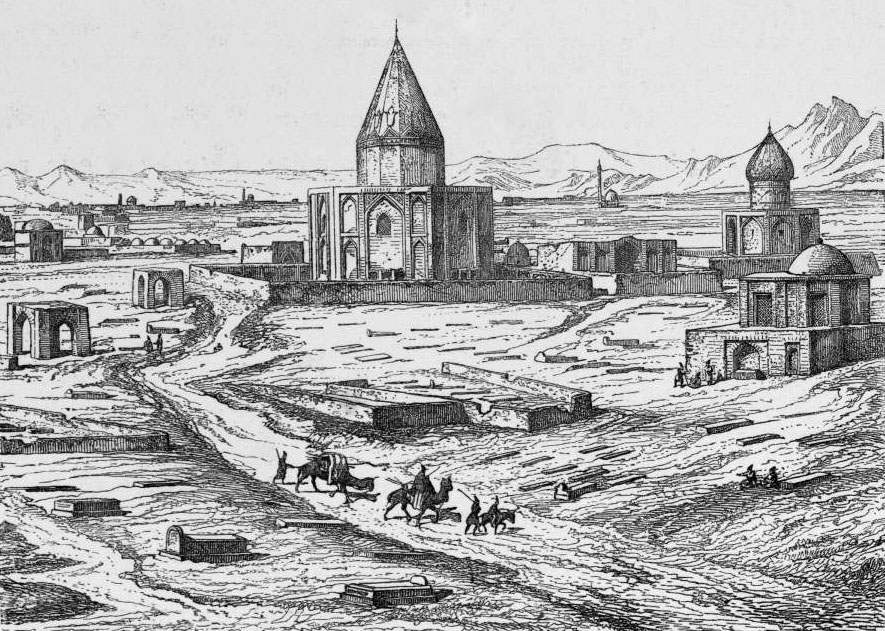
Dervishes Khanqah (Tomb of Baba Roknedin), Isfahan

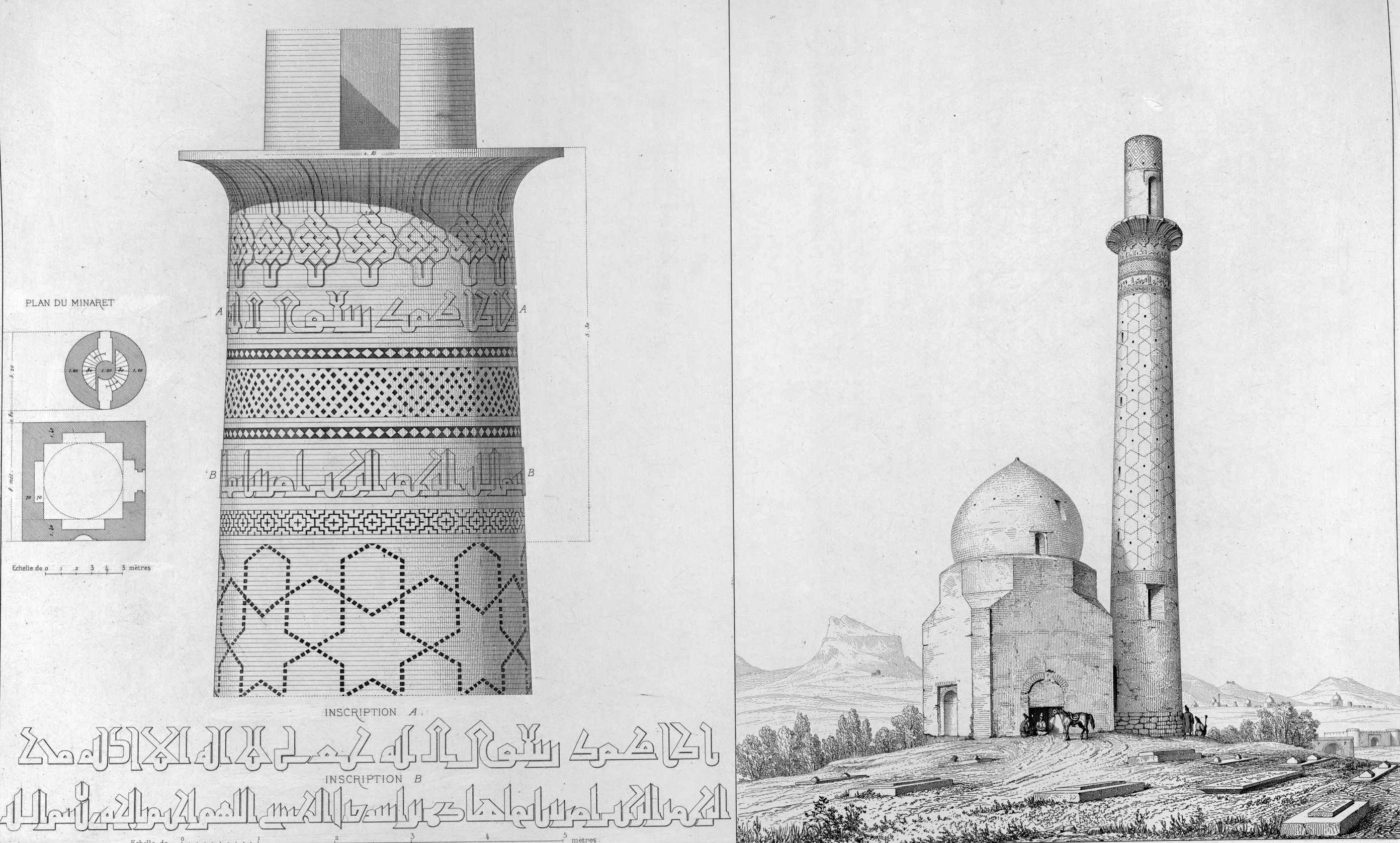
View details and minaret of Shahrestan

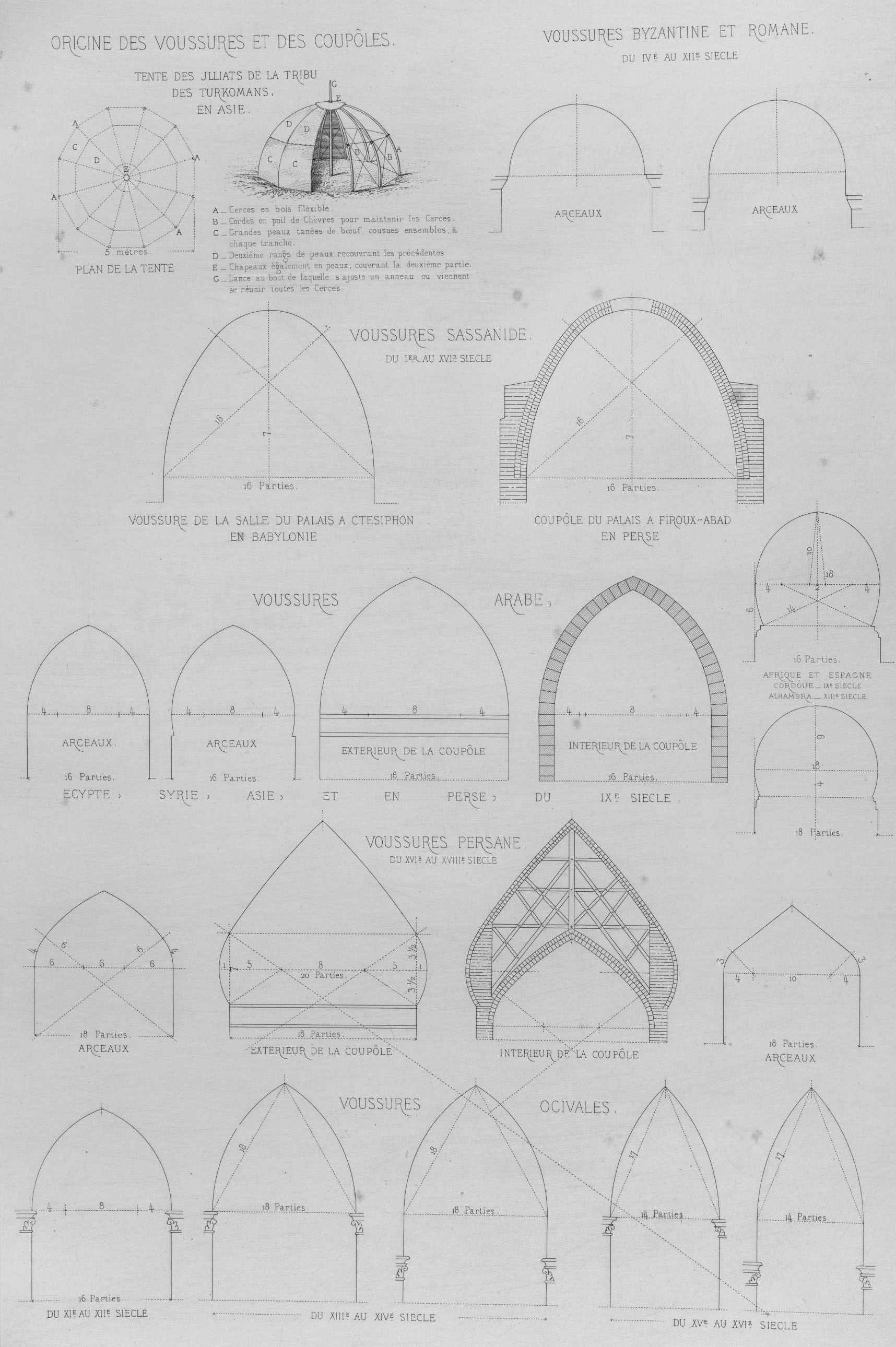
Domes comparison

== Komijan; Hamedan; Nahavand; Kangavar ==
=== Eugène Flandin ===
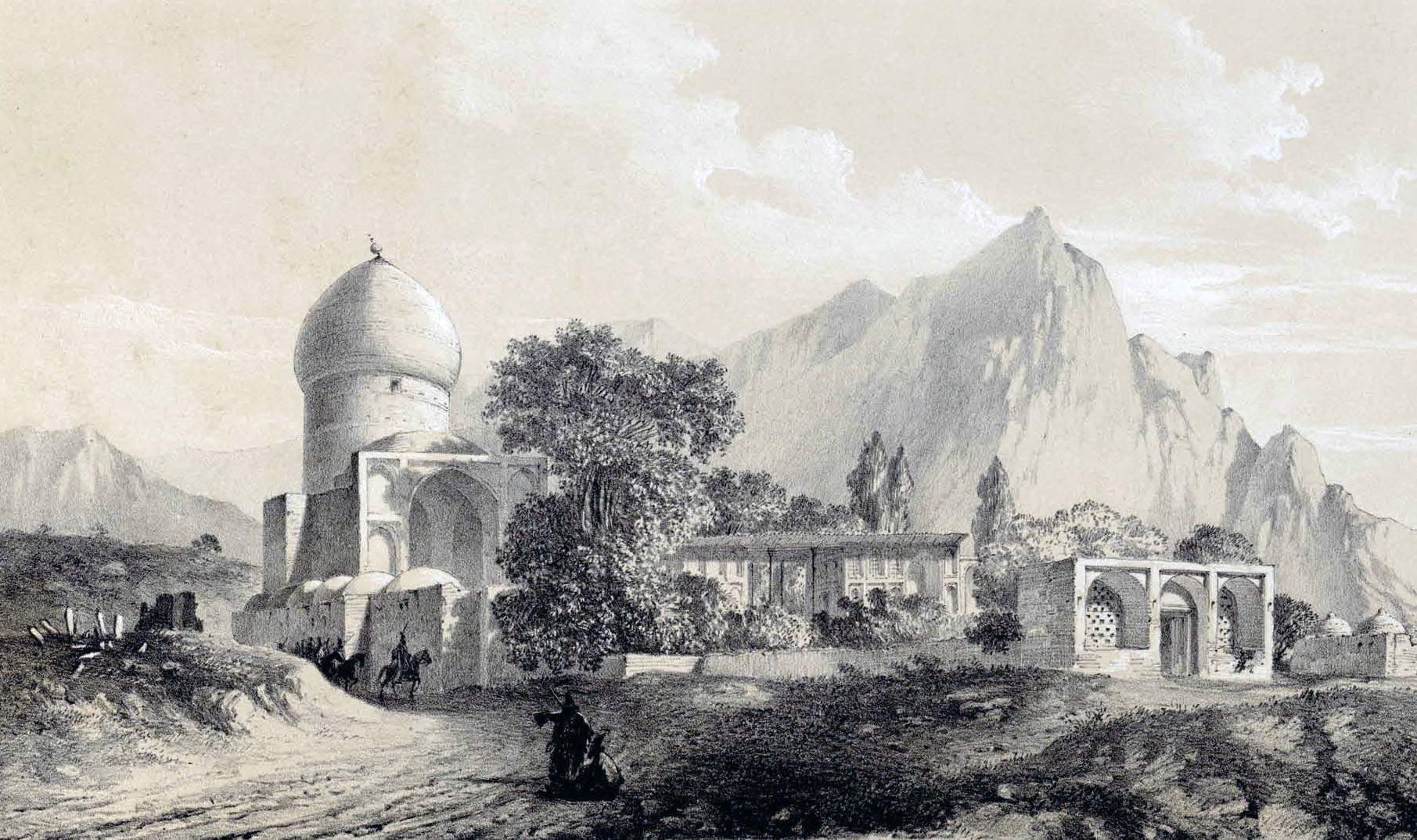
Imam Zadeh Komijan, Iraq Ajami

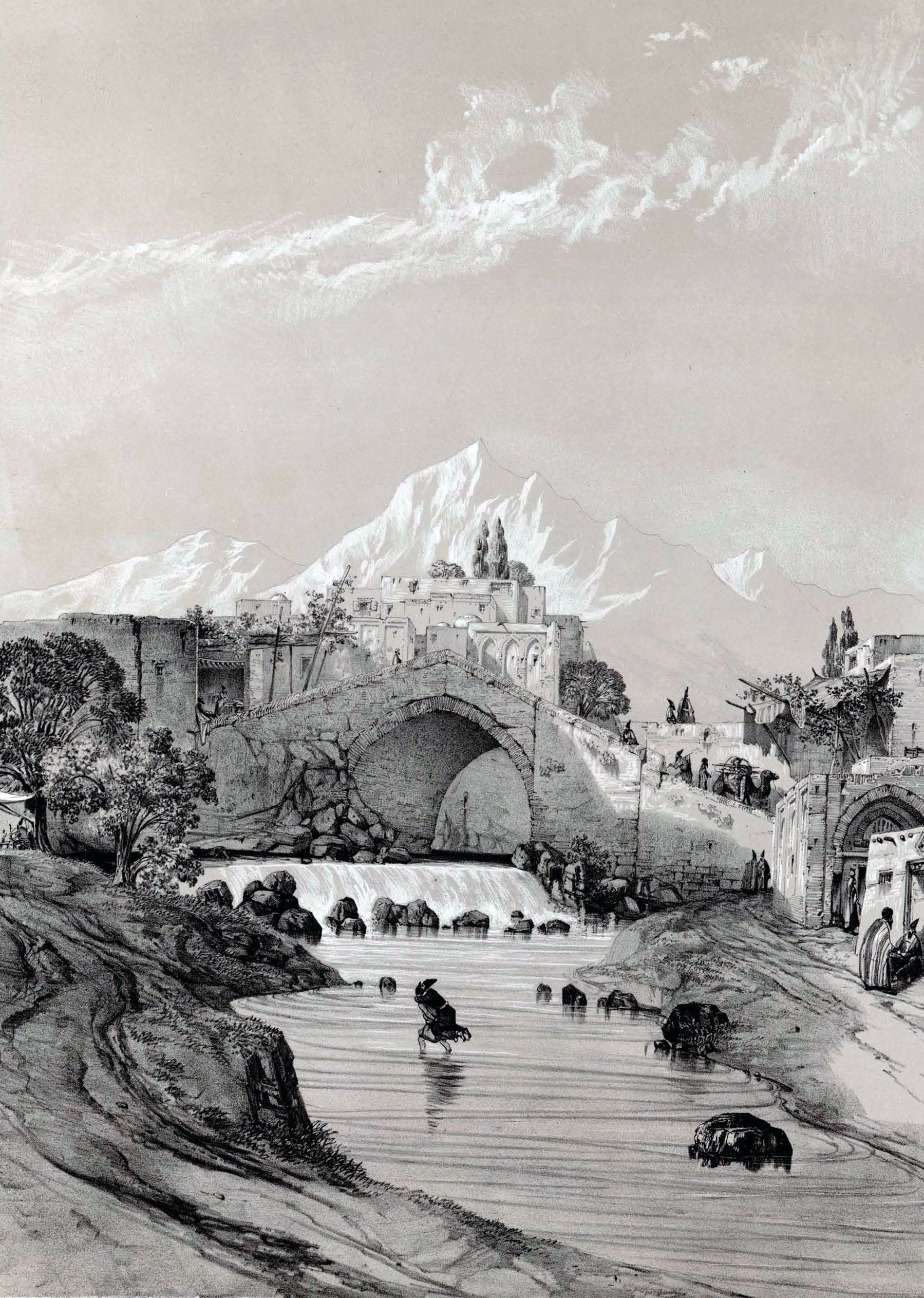
Hamedan

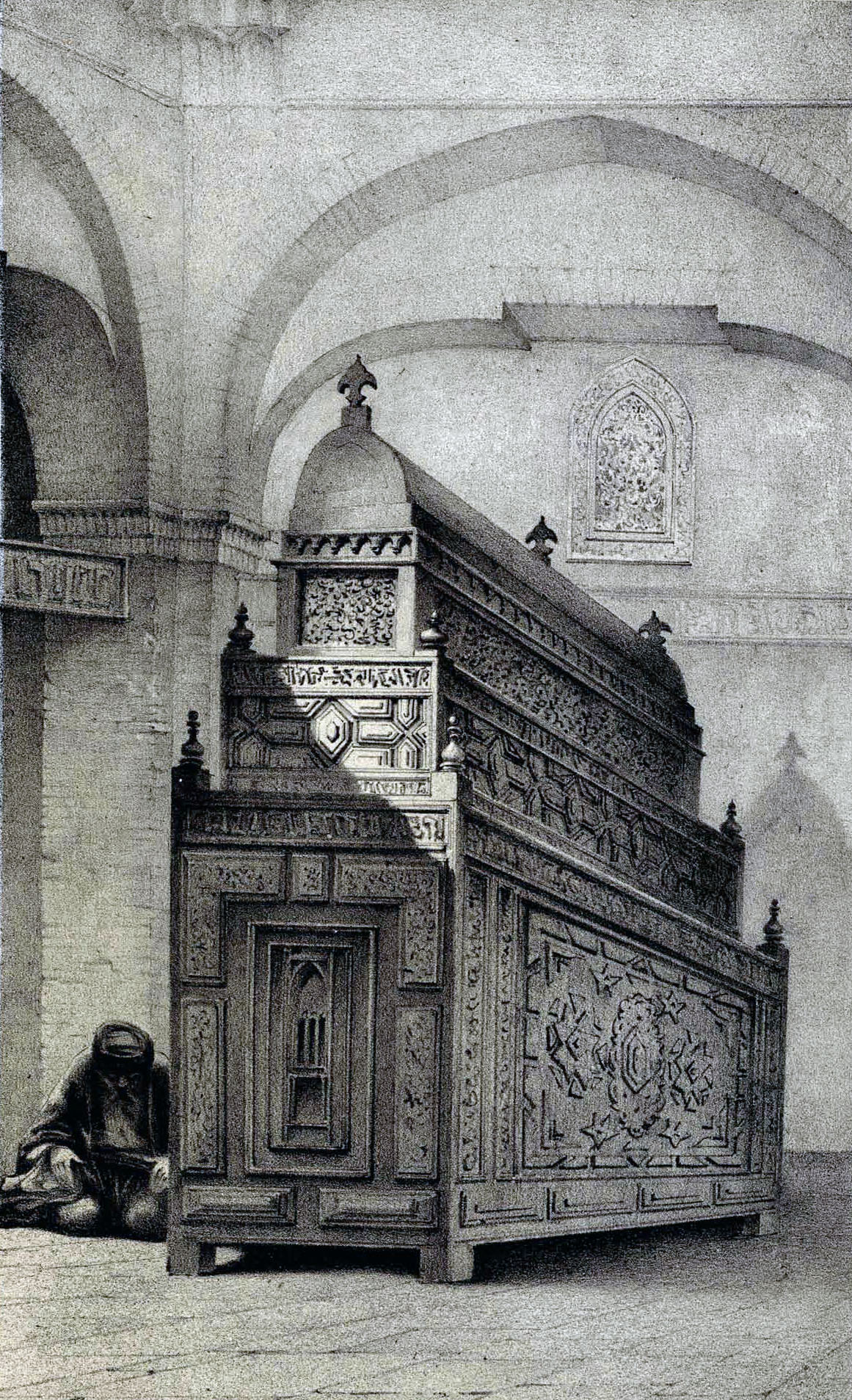
Cenotaph Esther

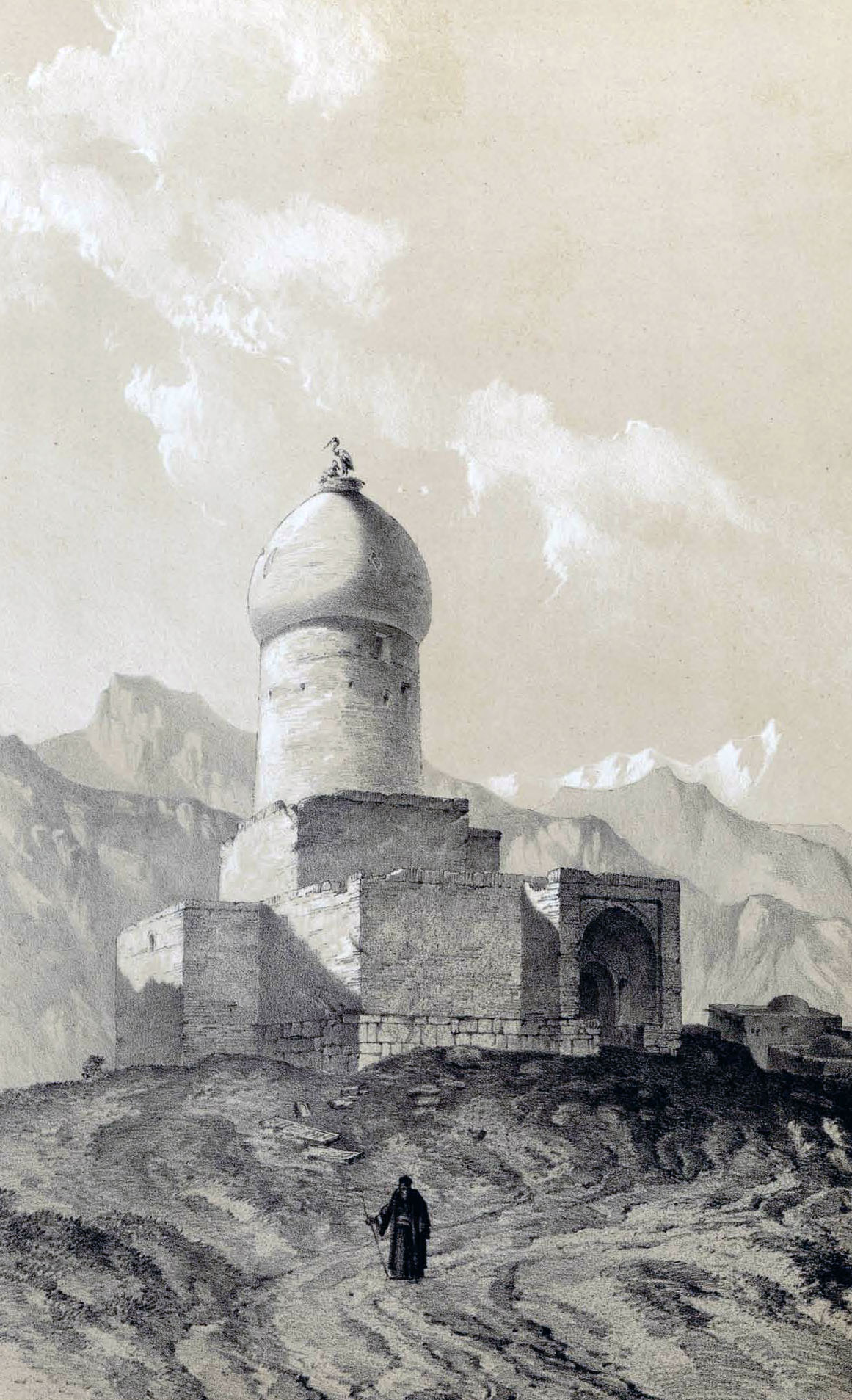
Monument erected to the memory of Esther and Mordecai, Hamadan

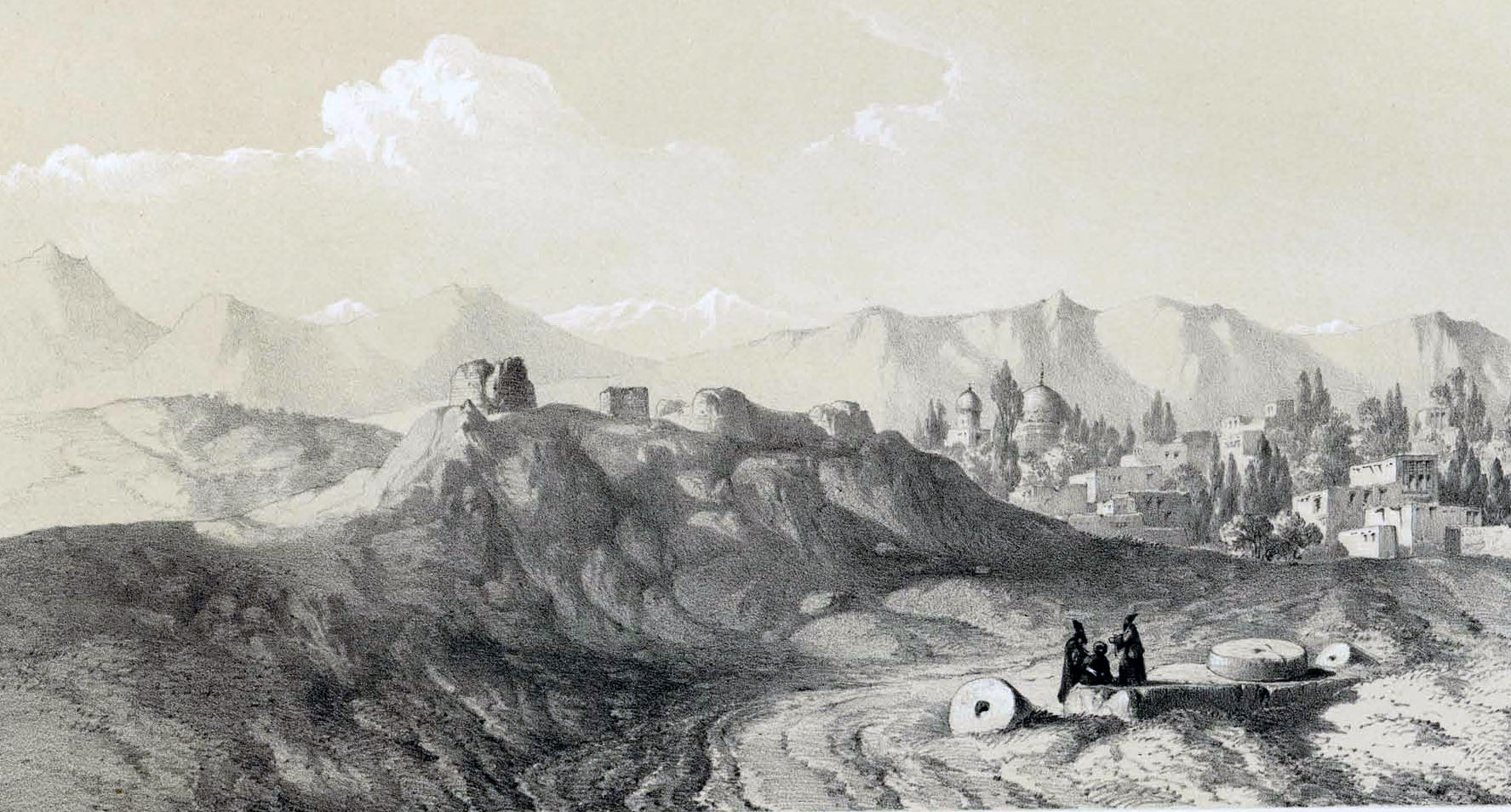
Hamadan

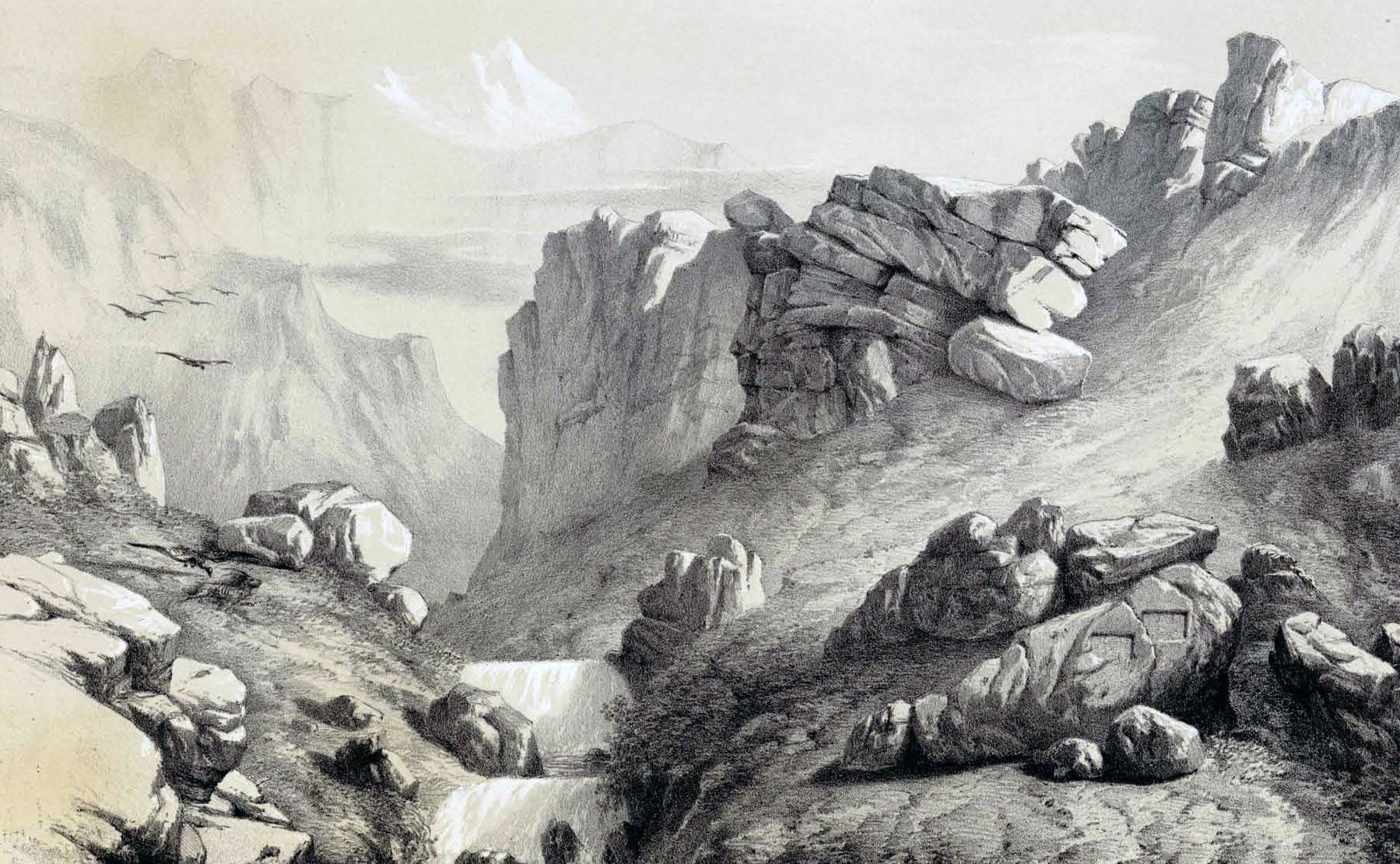
Mount Alvend, throat where cuneiform tablets near Hamadan (Ganjnameh)

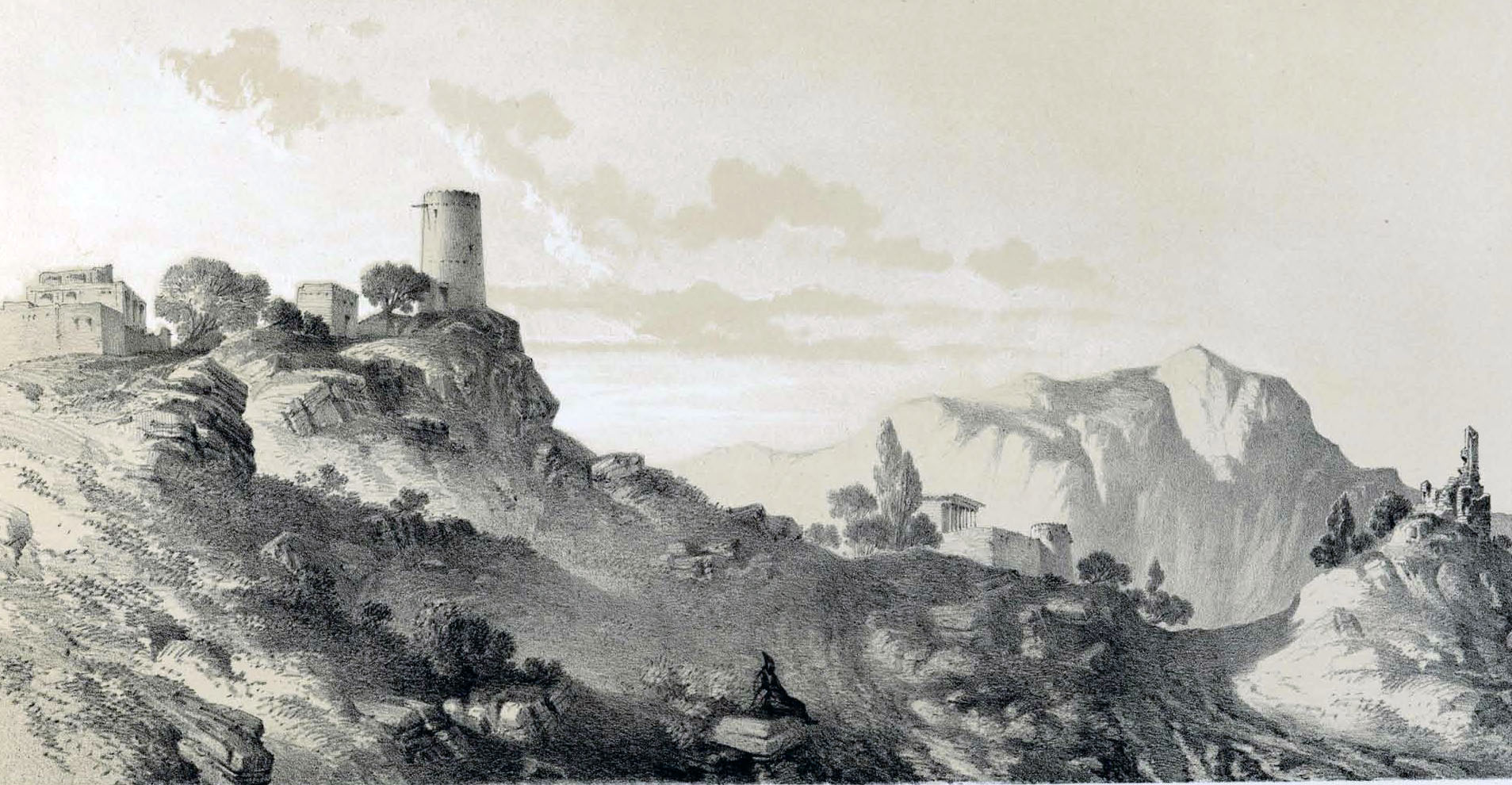
Around Kangavar

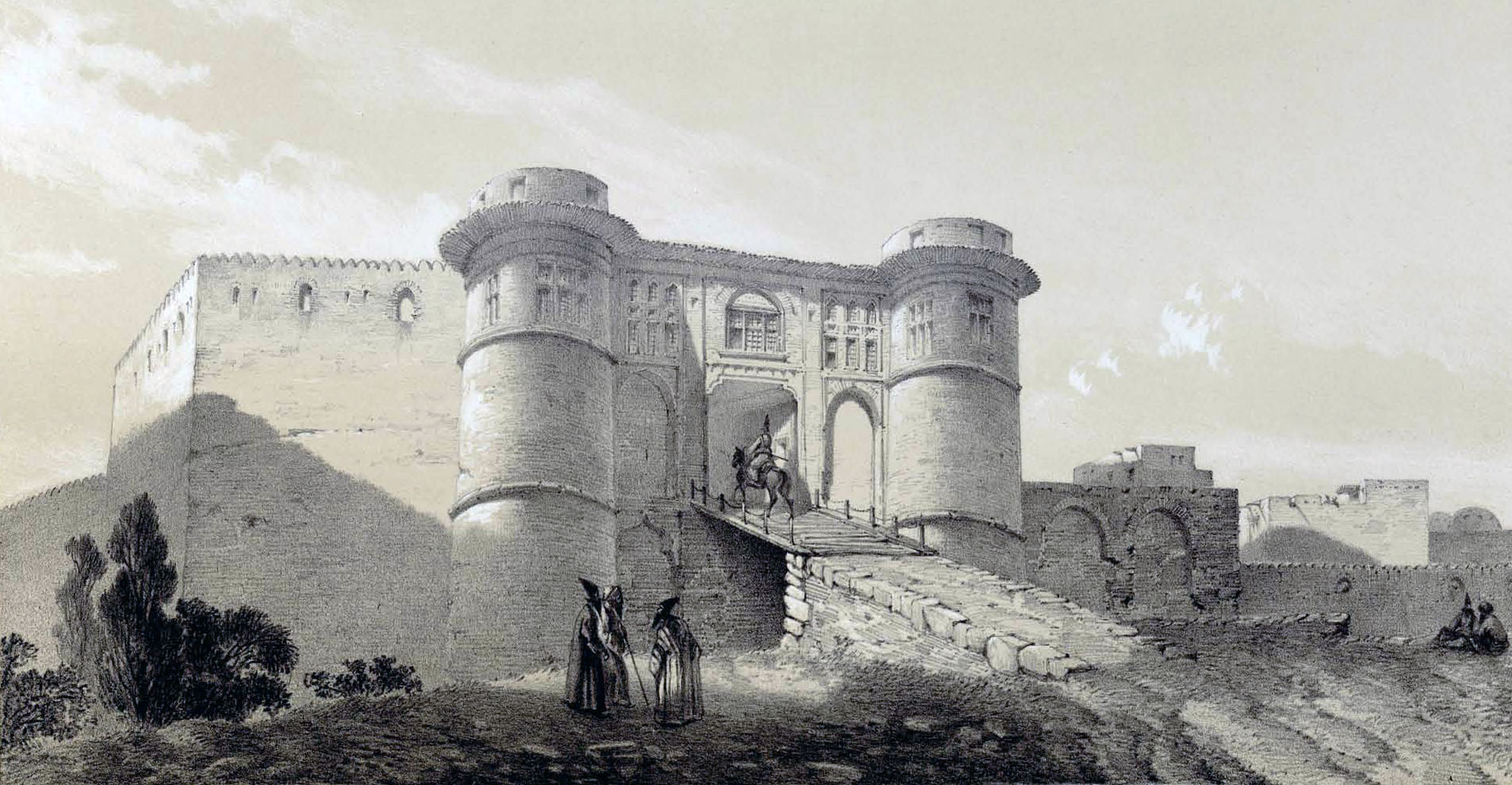
Castle Nahavend

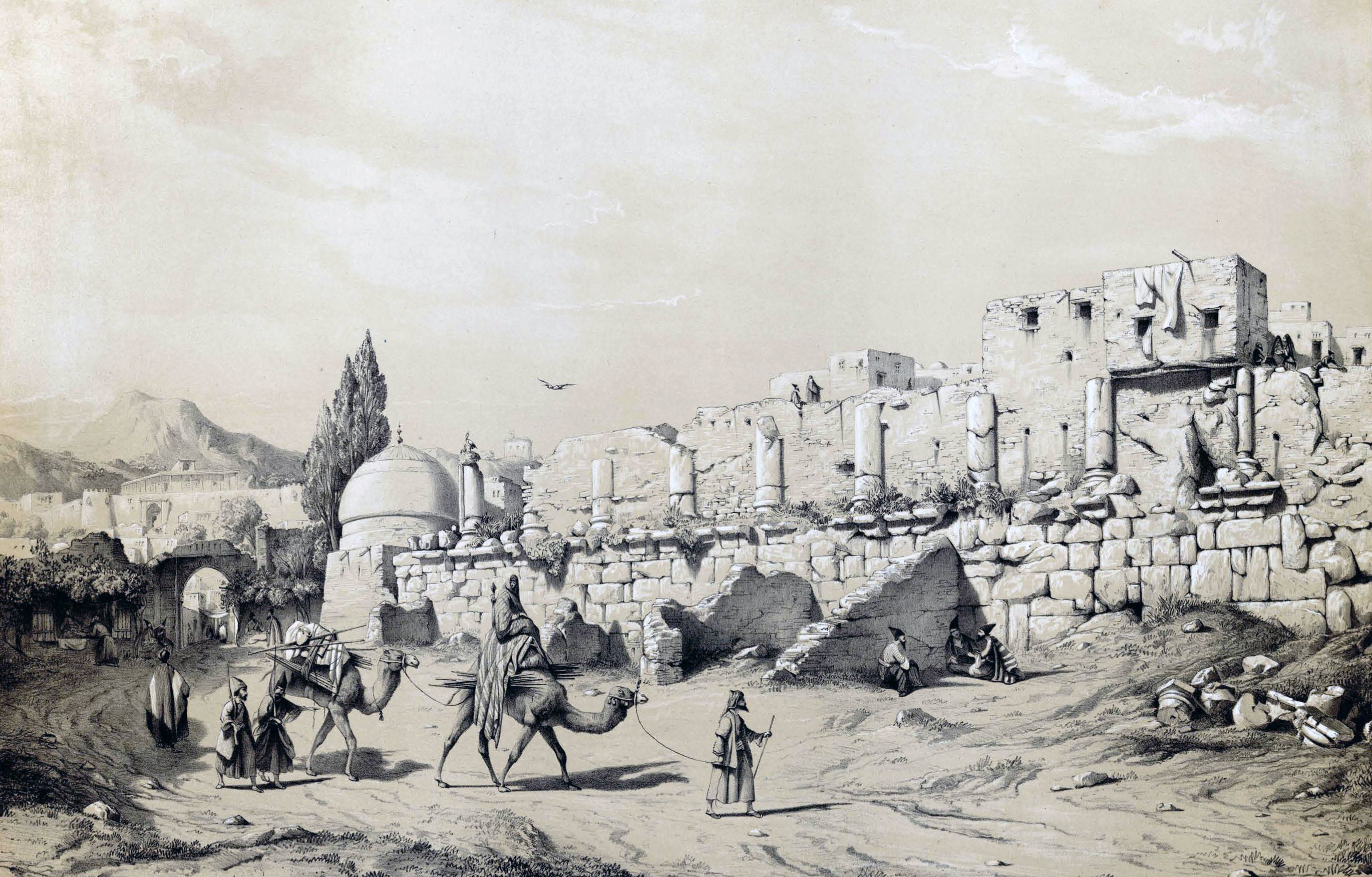
Ruins of a Greek temple, Kingavar (Temple of Anahita)

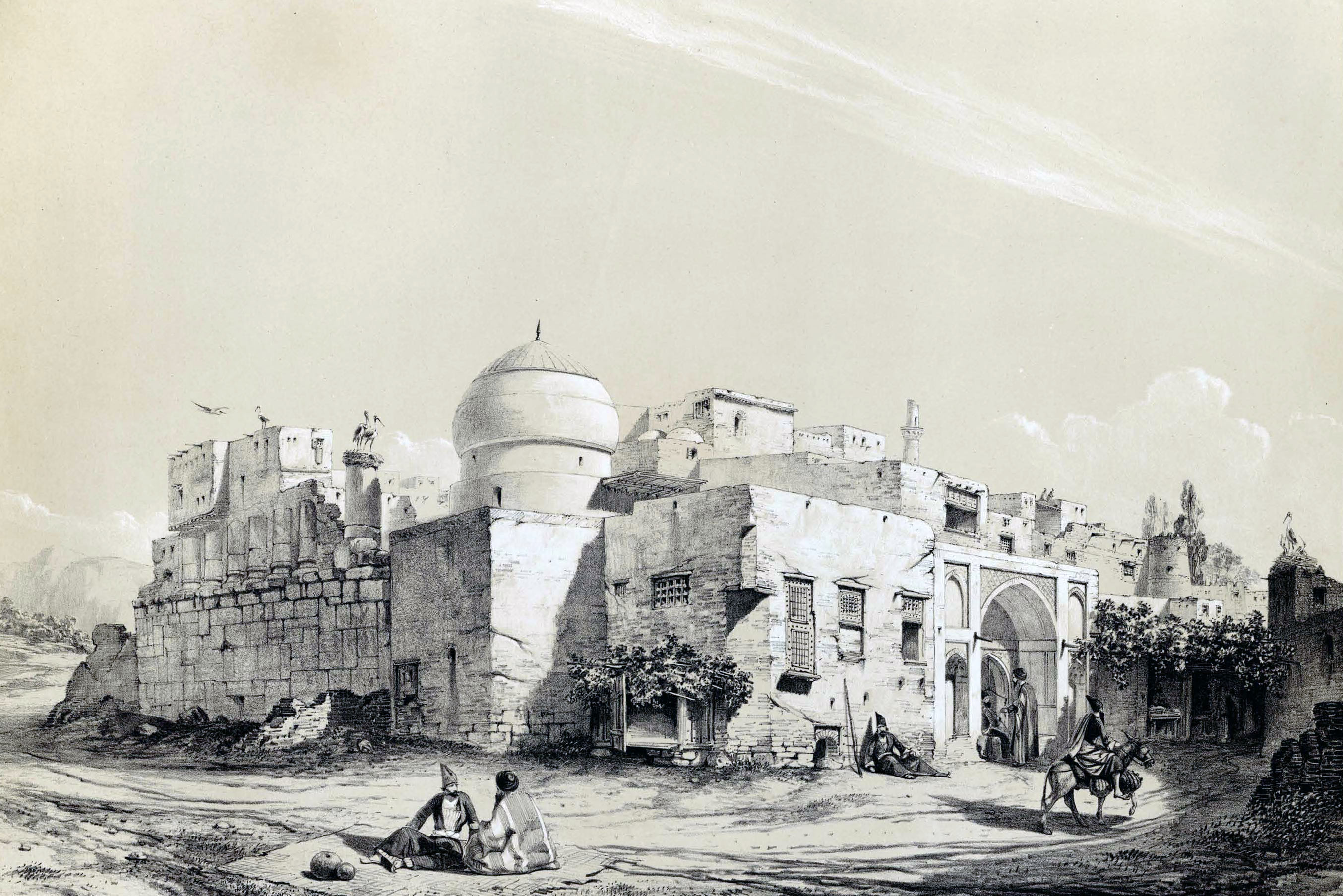
Kangavar

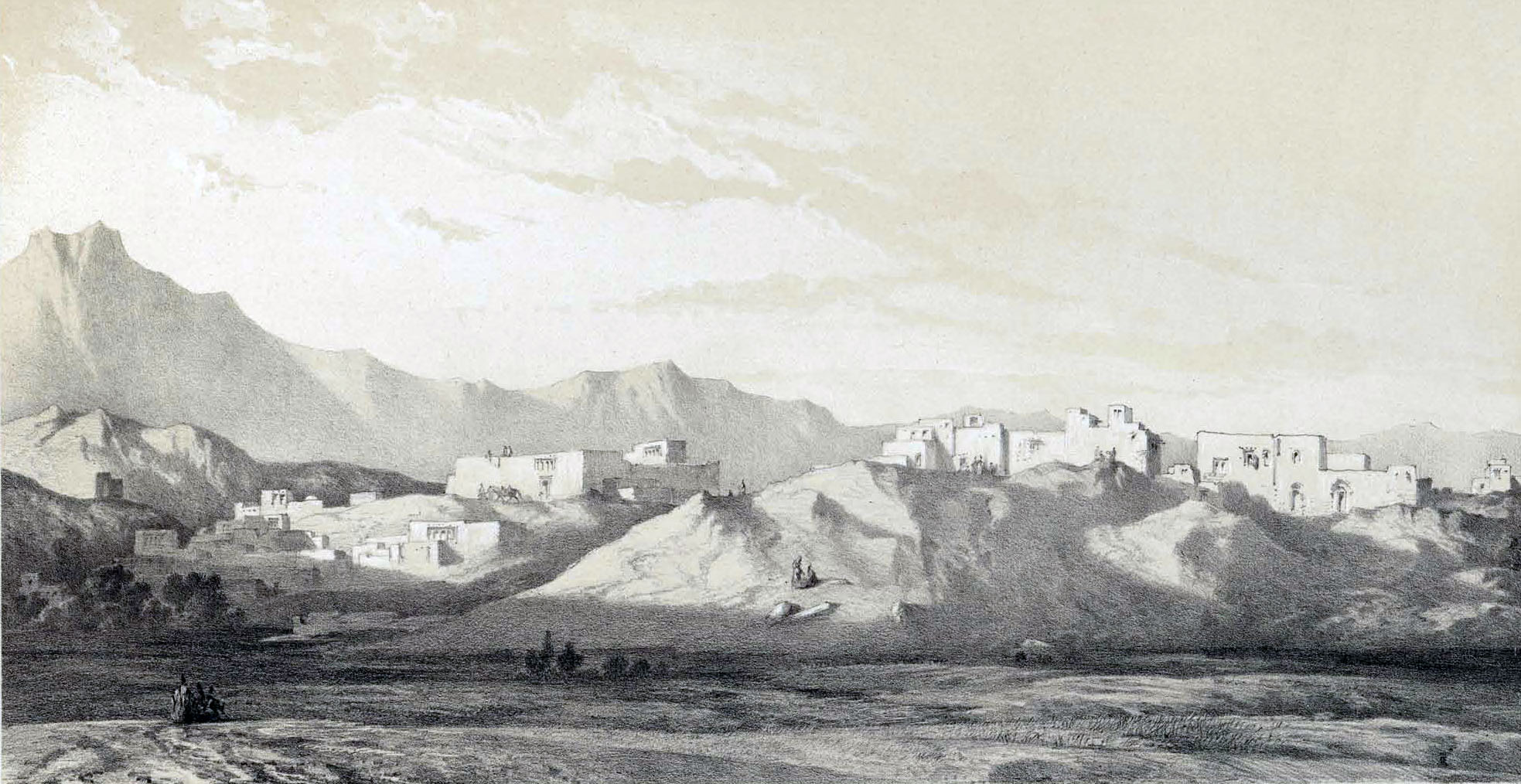
Kangavar

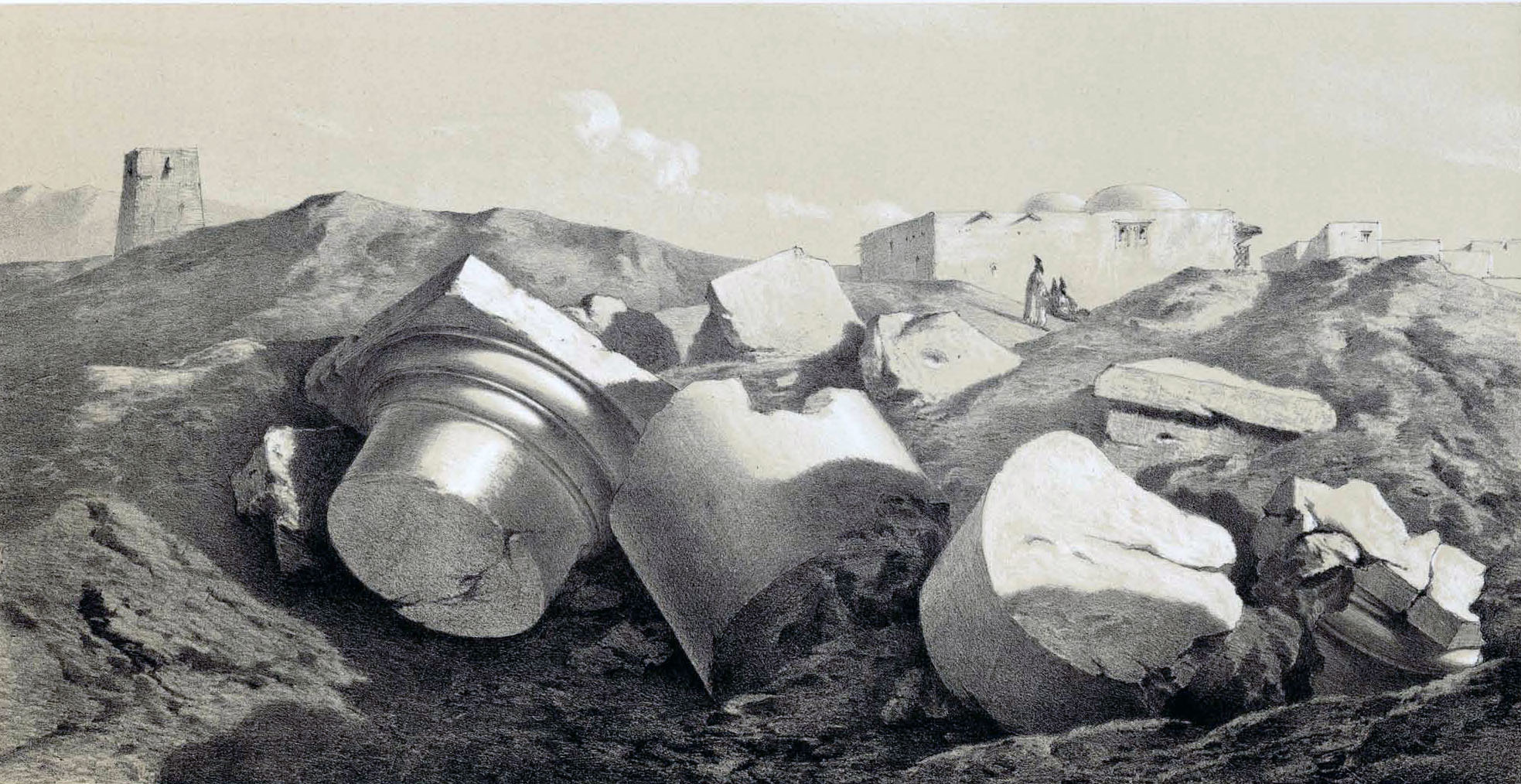
Fragments of columns Kangavar

=== Pascal Coste ===
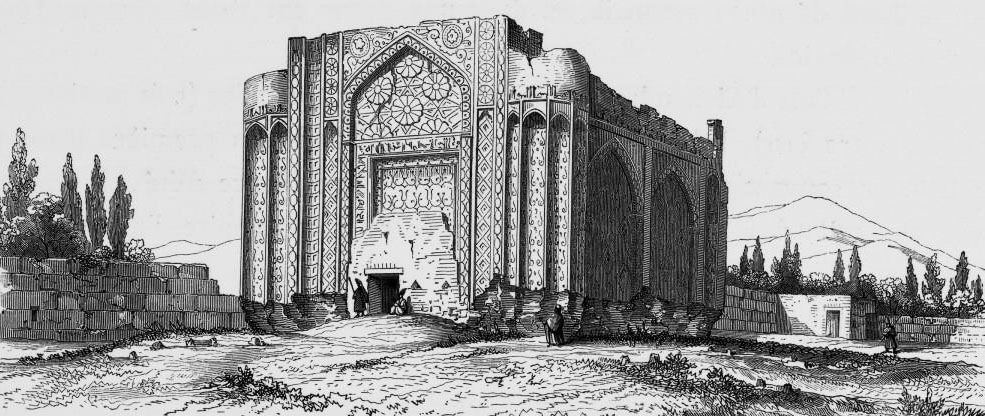
Ruined Mosque (Alavian dome) Hamedan

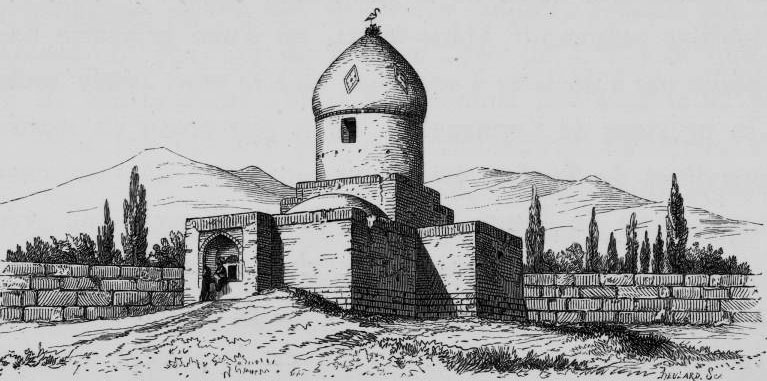
Tomb of Esther and Mordechai

== Bisotun; Sahneh; Taq-e Bostan; Borujerd; Yezd-e-Kast; Mahyar ==
=== Eugène Flandin ===
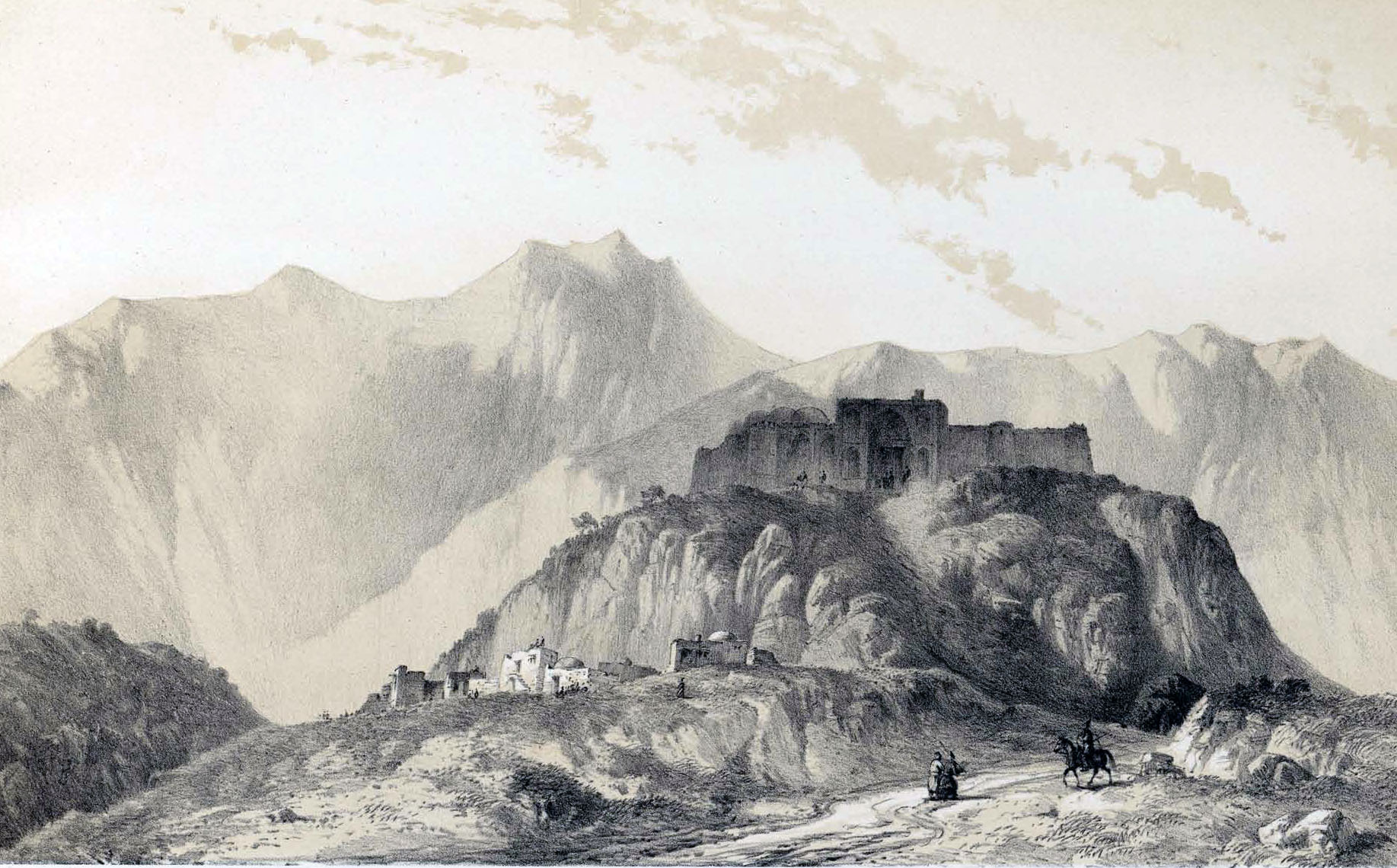
Caravanserai Hambari the foot of Mount Bisotun

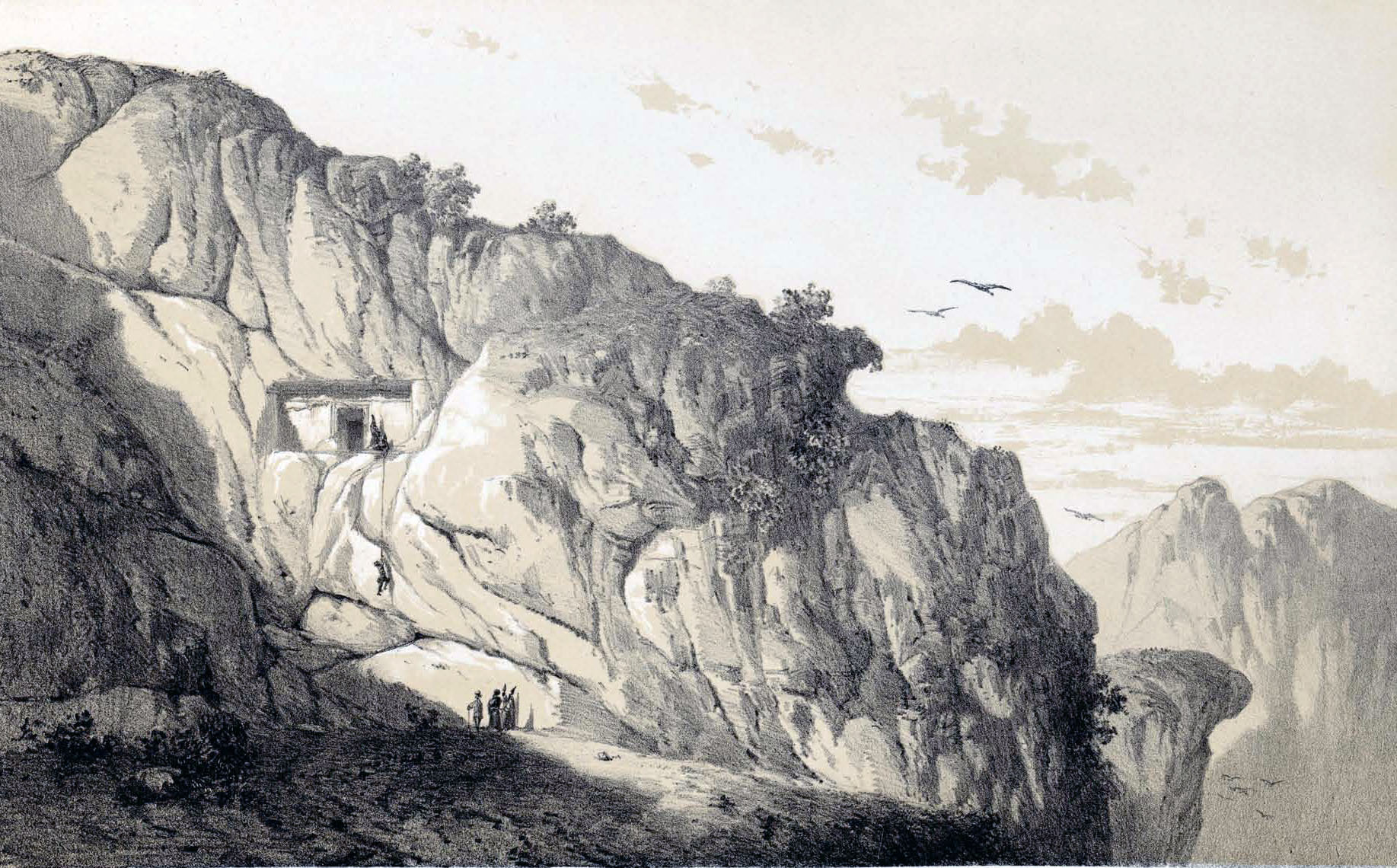
Tomb carved into the rock (Catacombs), Sahneh

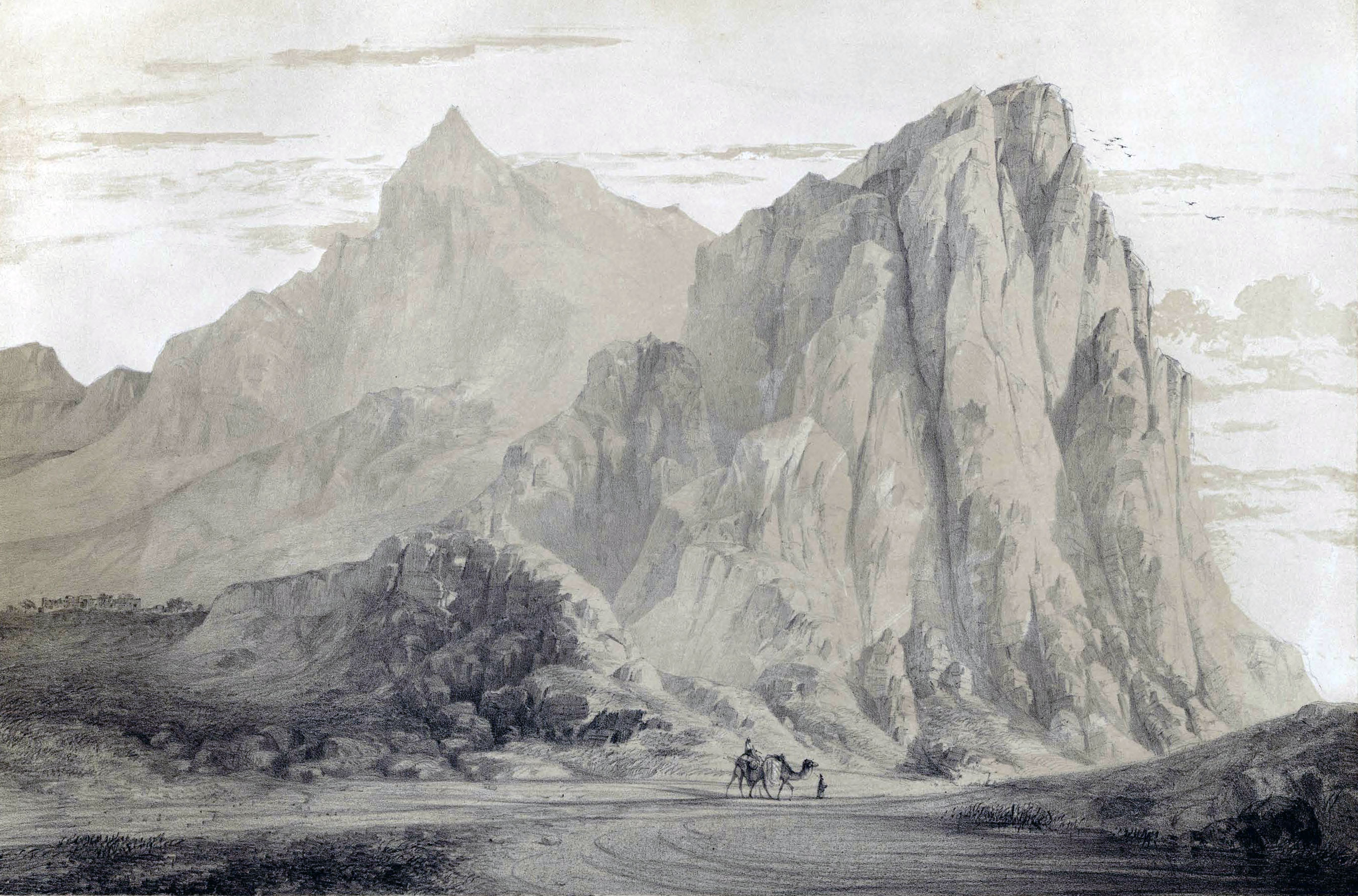
Mount Bisotun

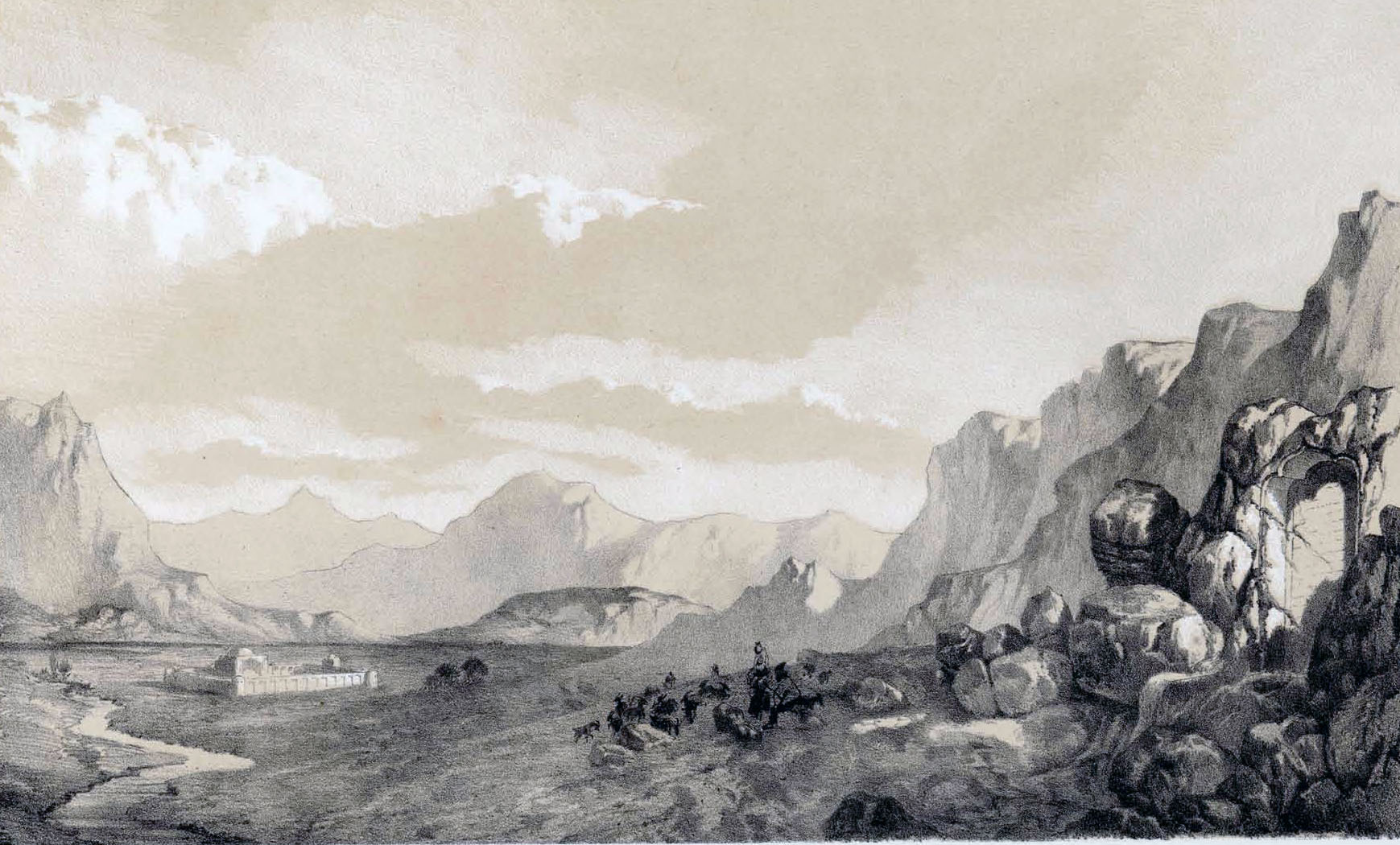
Caravanserai Bisotun

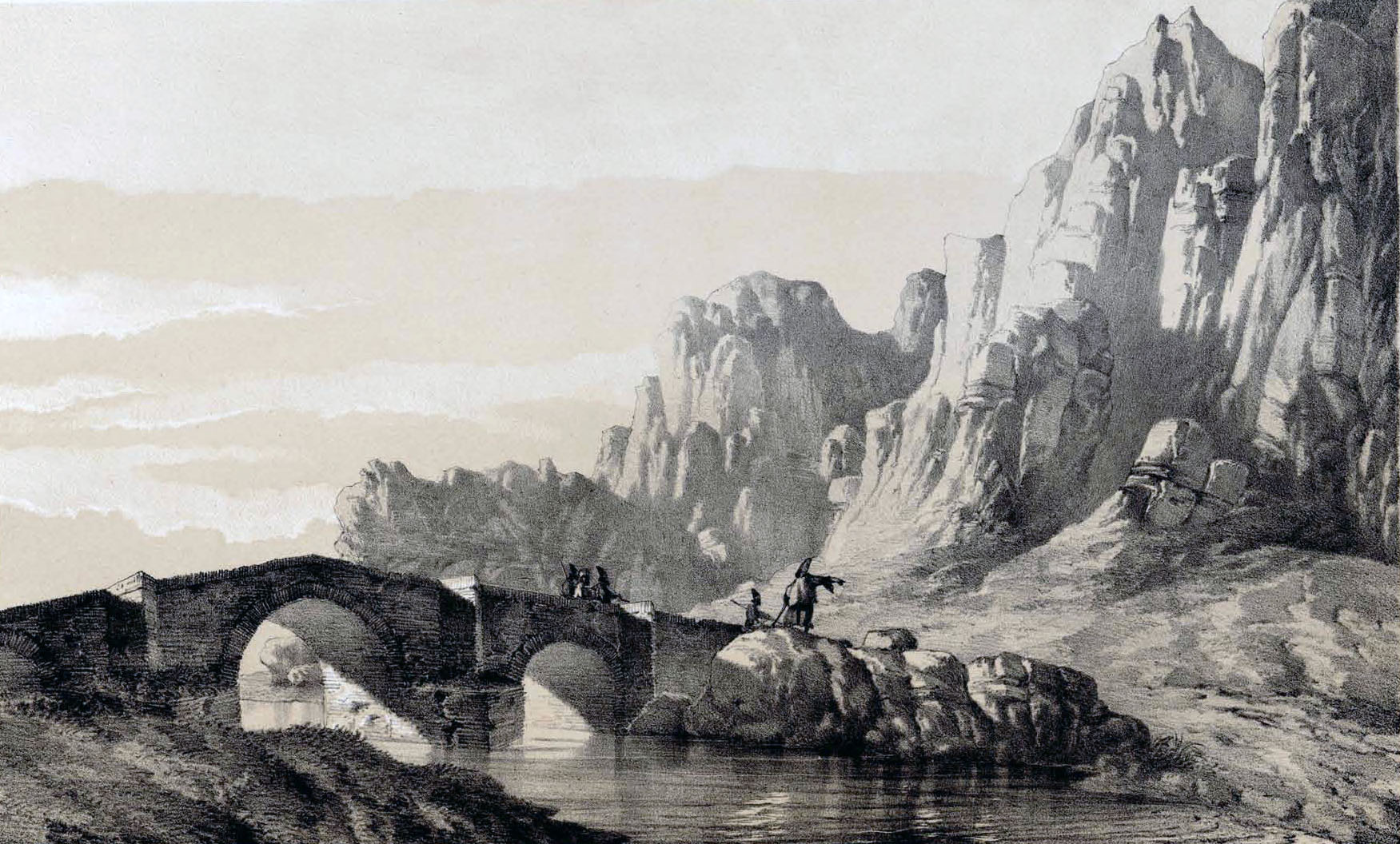
Cave and village Tagh i Bustan, near Kermanshah

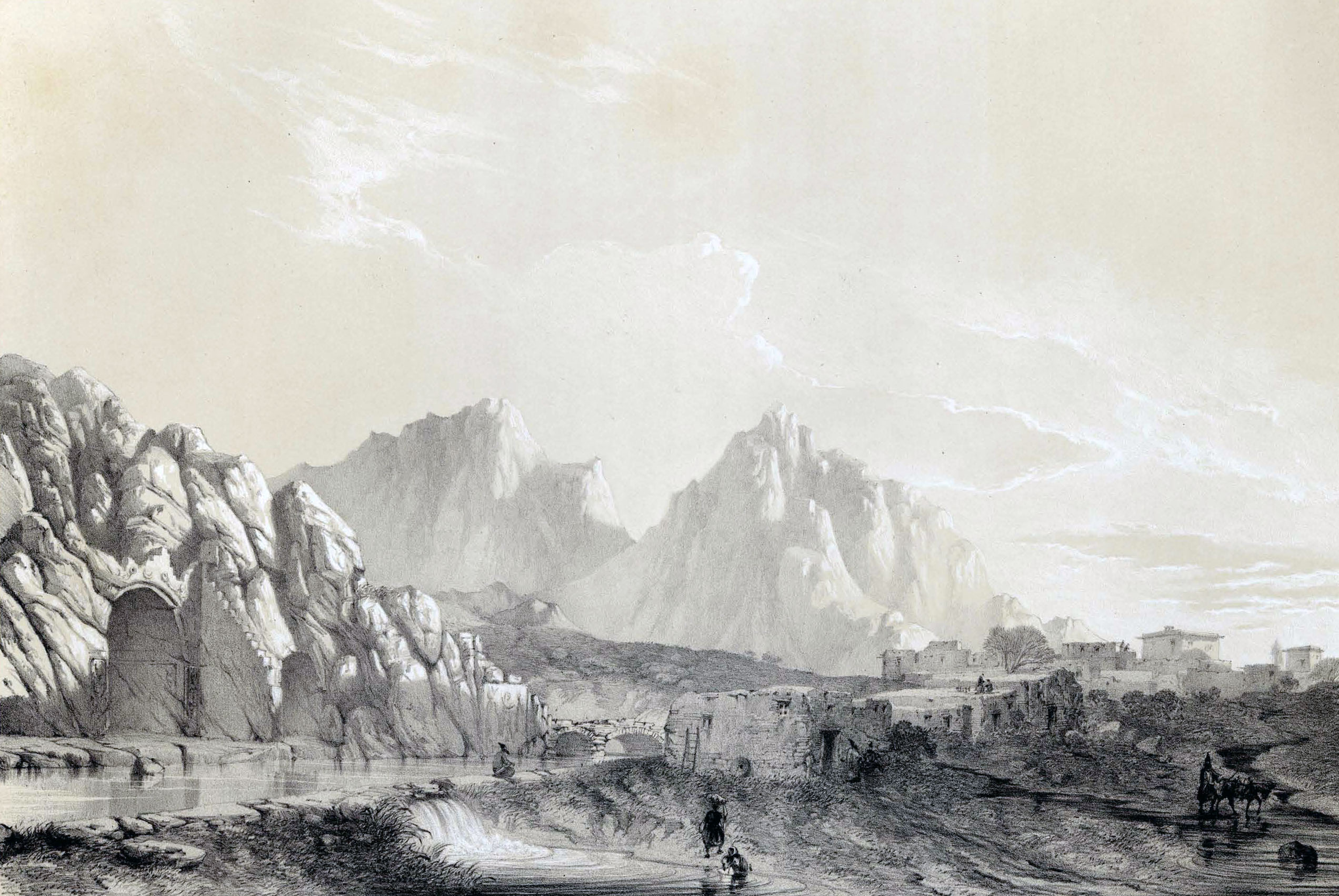
Cave and village Tagh i Bustan, near Kermanshah

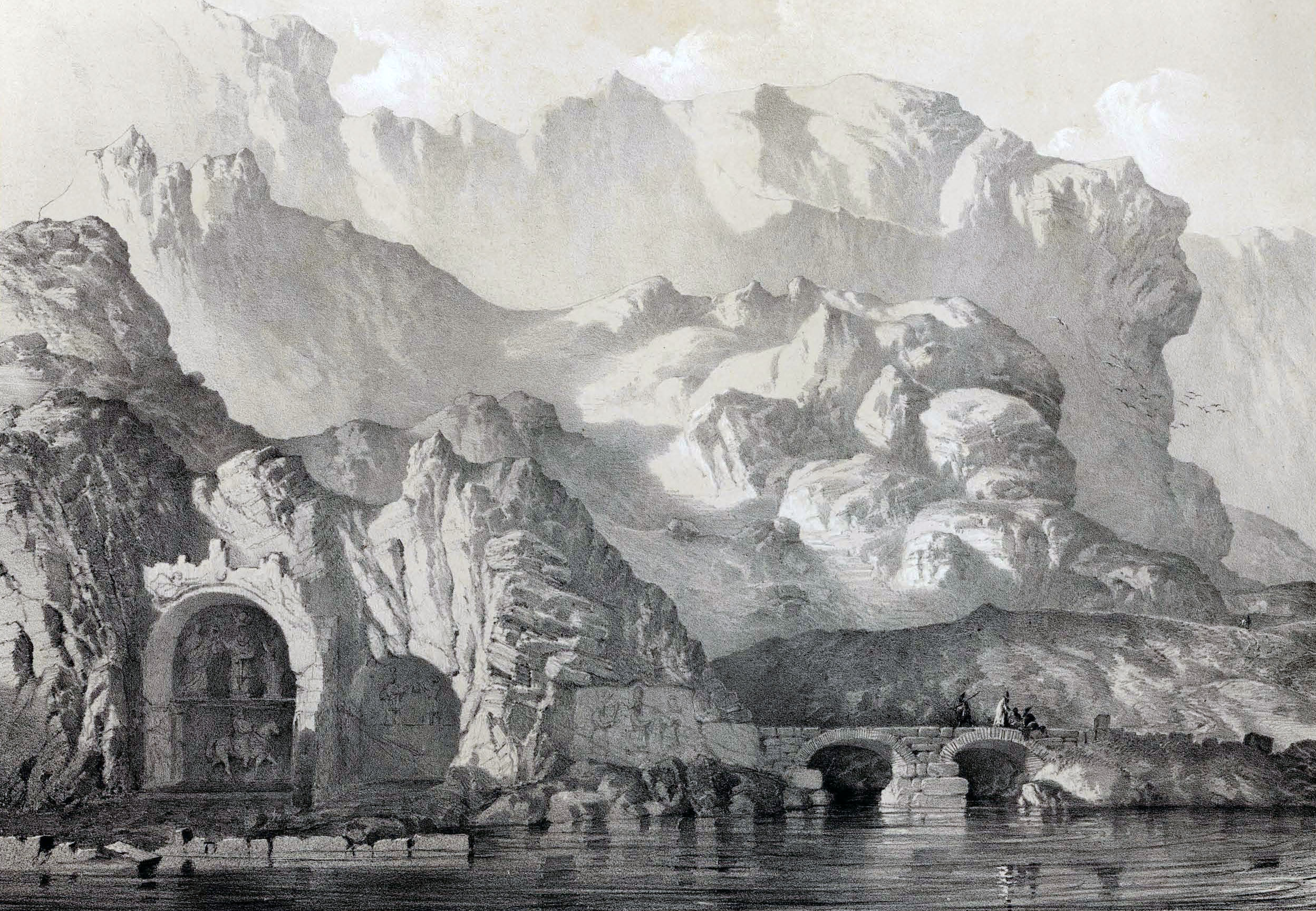
Cave and village Tagh i Bustan, near Kermanshah

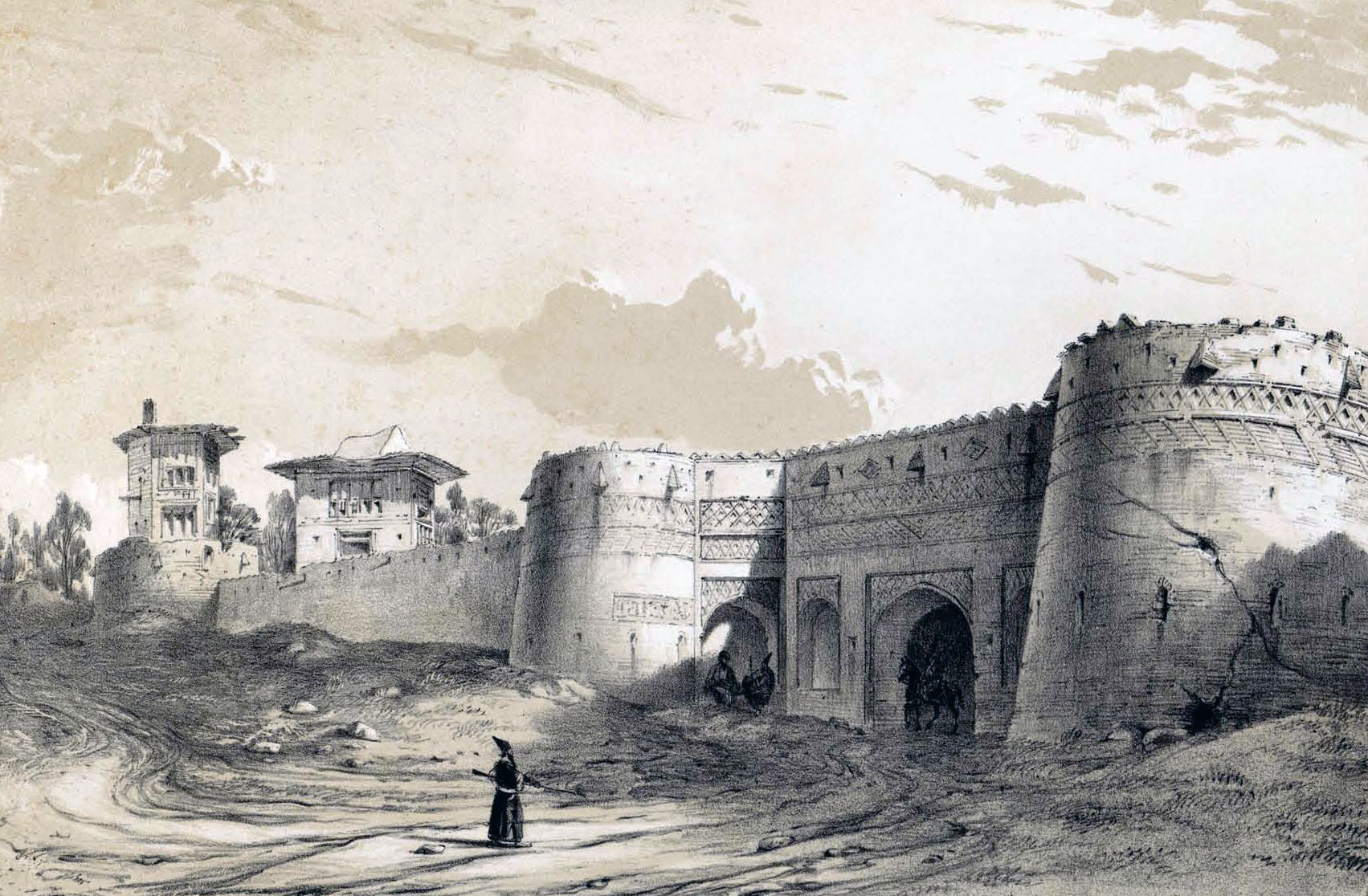
City Gate, Borujerd (Soltani Mosque)

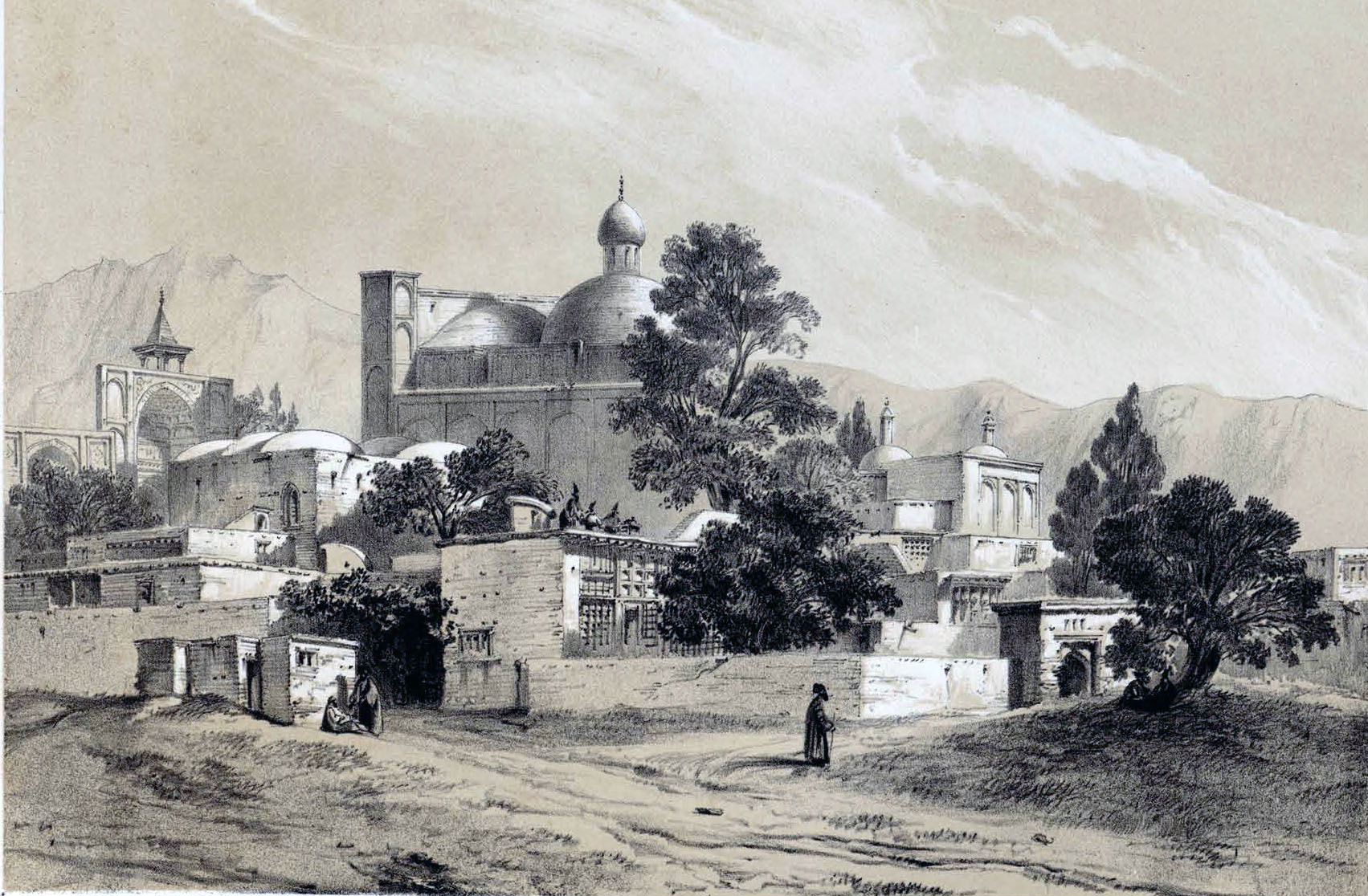
Boroujerd

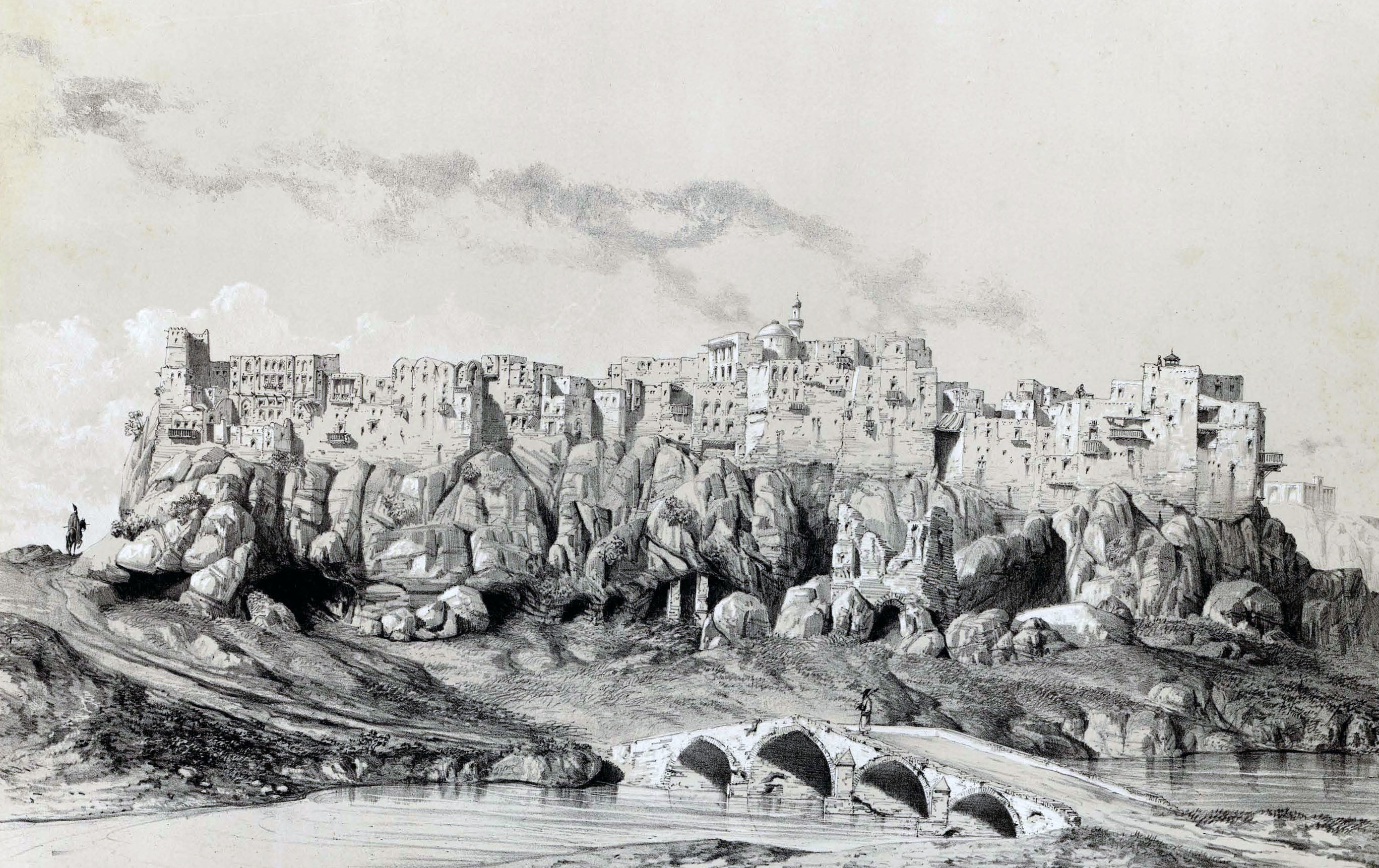
Castle, Yezd-i-Kast

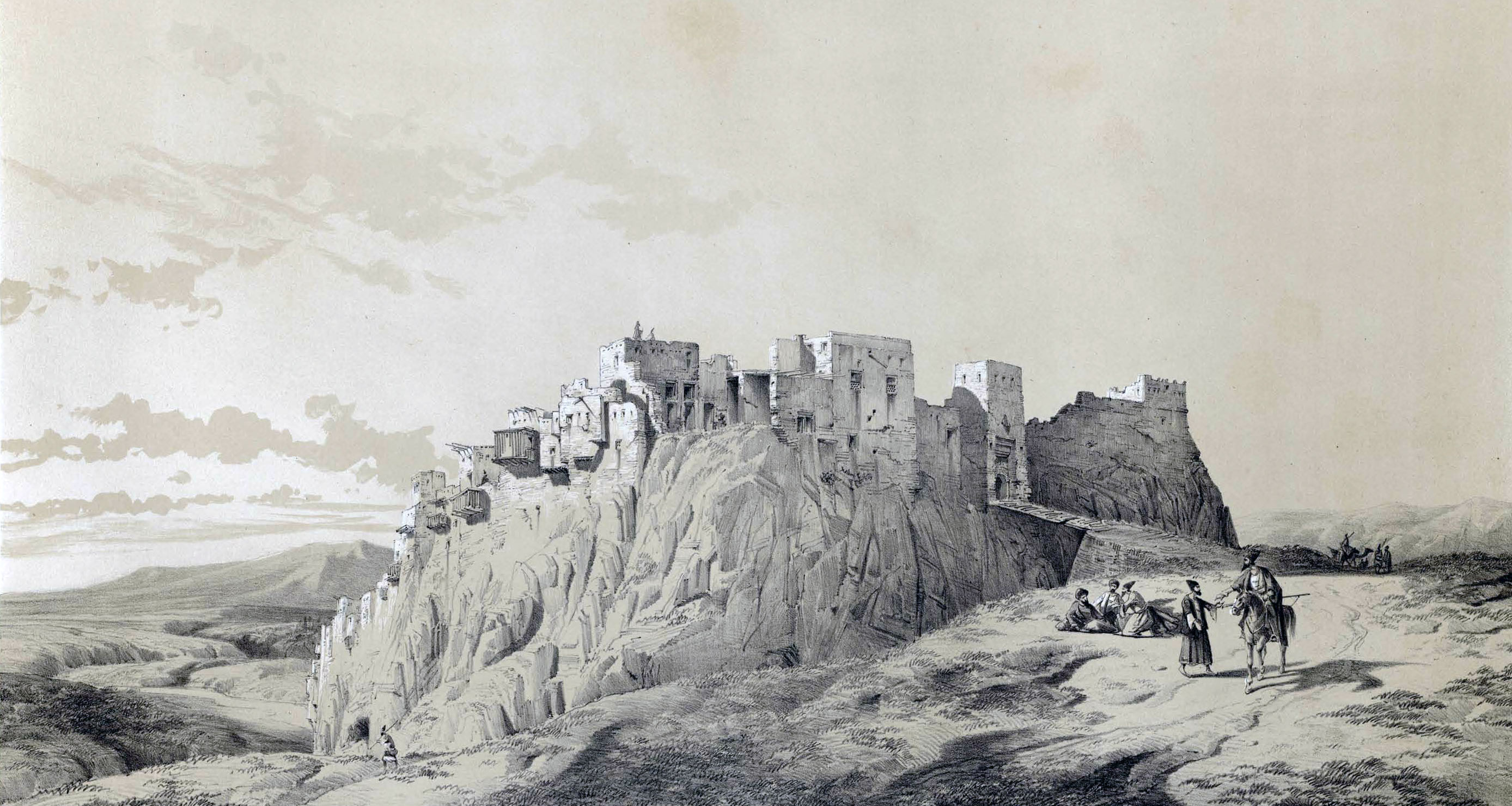
Castle, Yezd-i-Kast

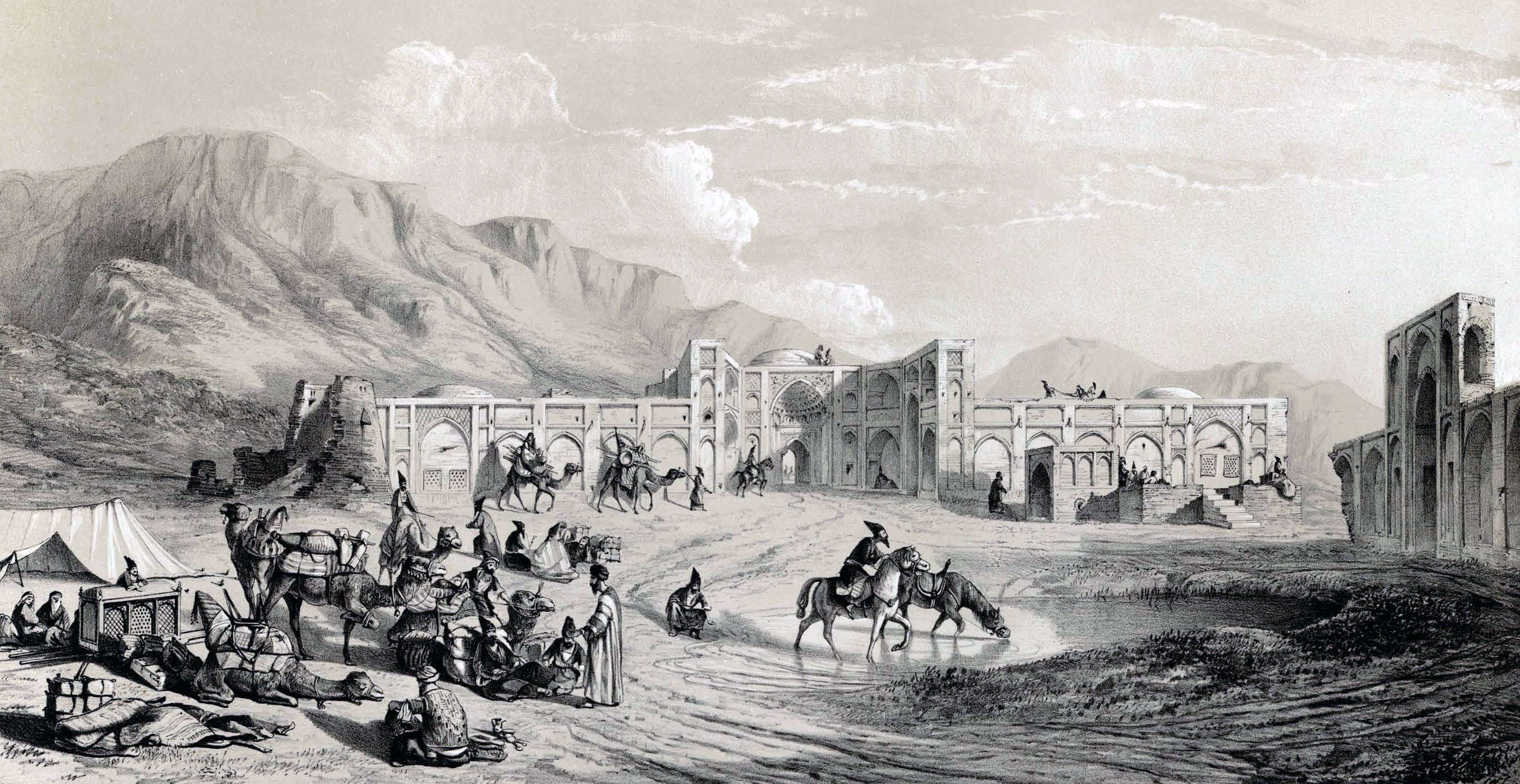
Caravanserai Mahyar, exterior view

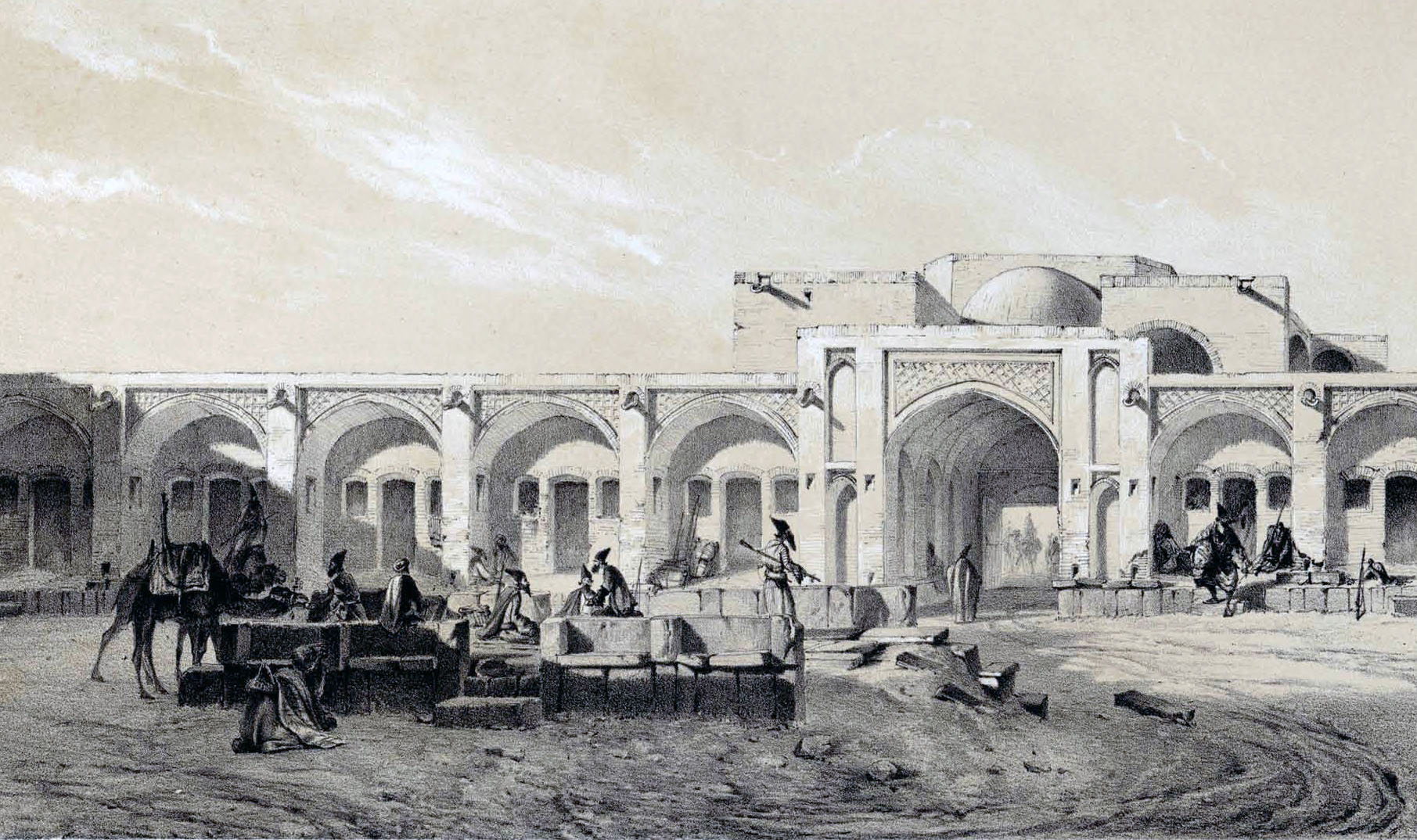
Courtyard of the caravanserai Mahyar, Road Isfahan Shiraz

=== Pascal Coste ===
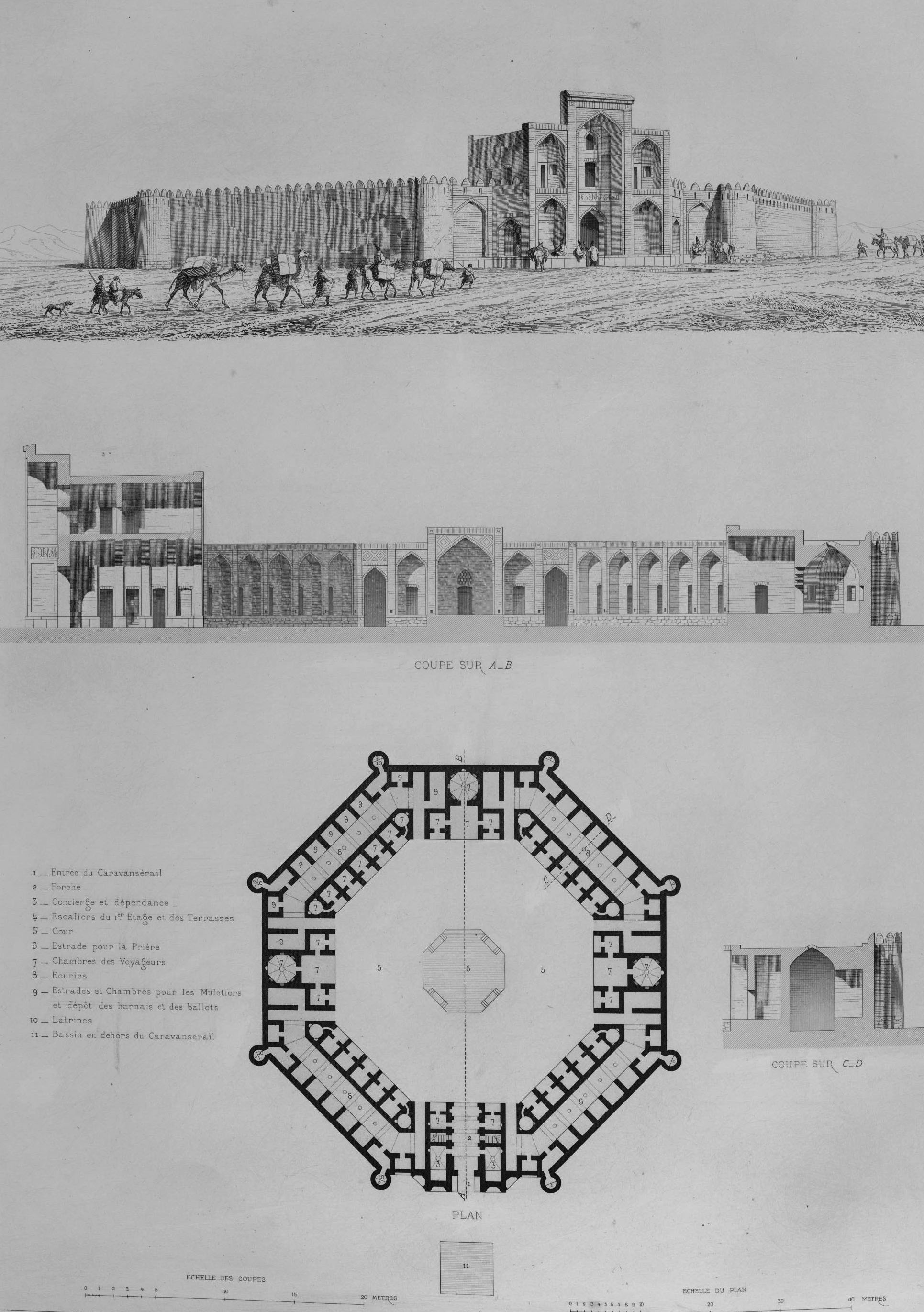
Amin Abad caravanserai on the road to Isfahan Shiraz

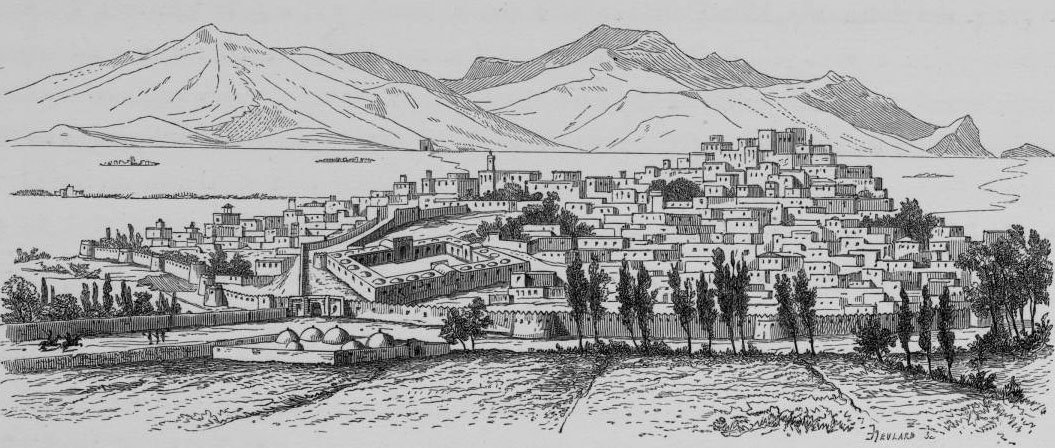
Kermanshah

== Shiraz ==
=== Eugène Flandin ===
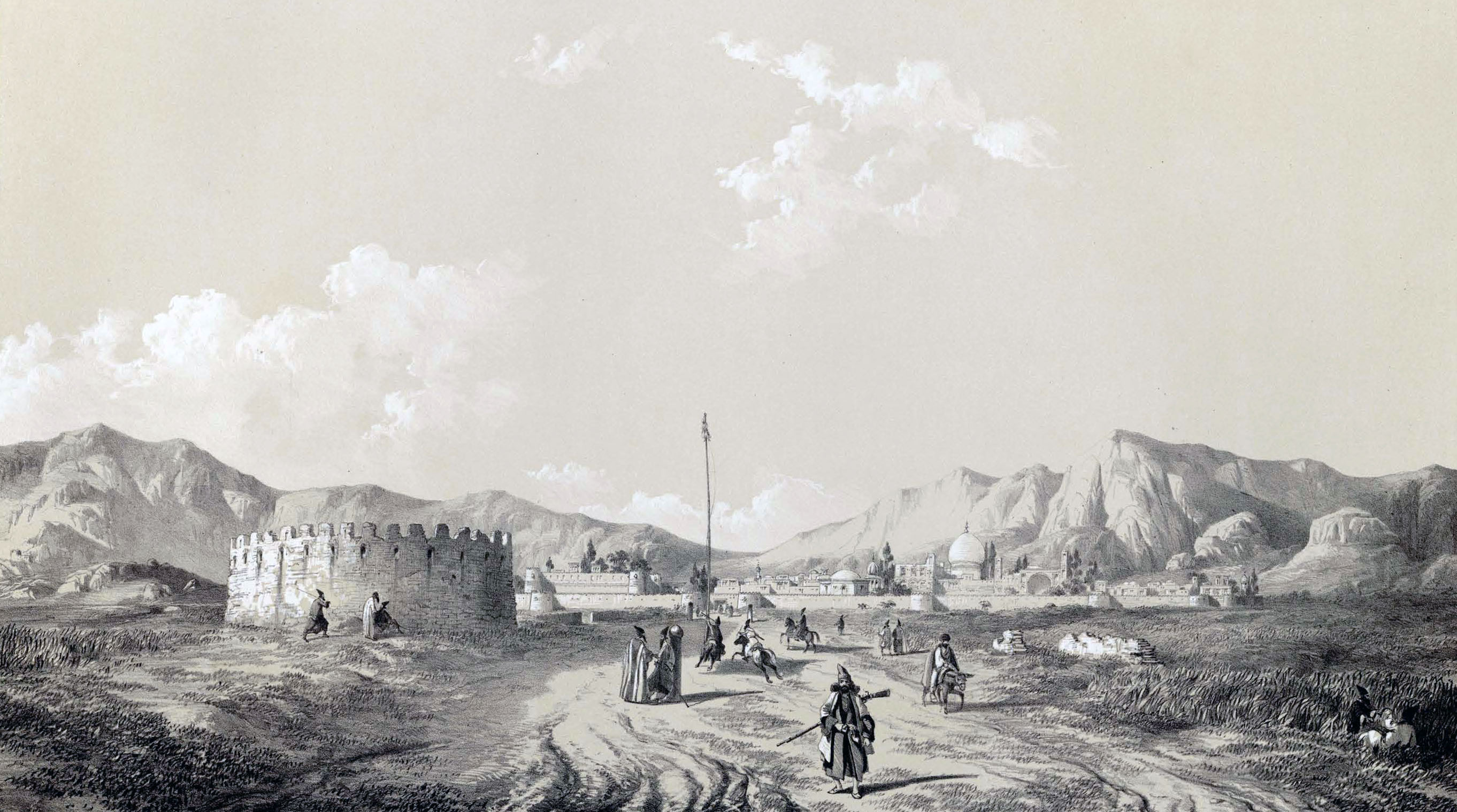
Mamasanis tower

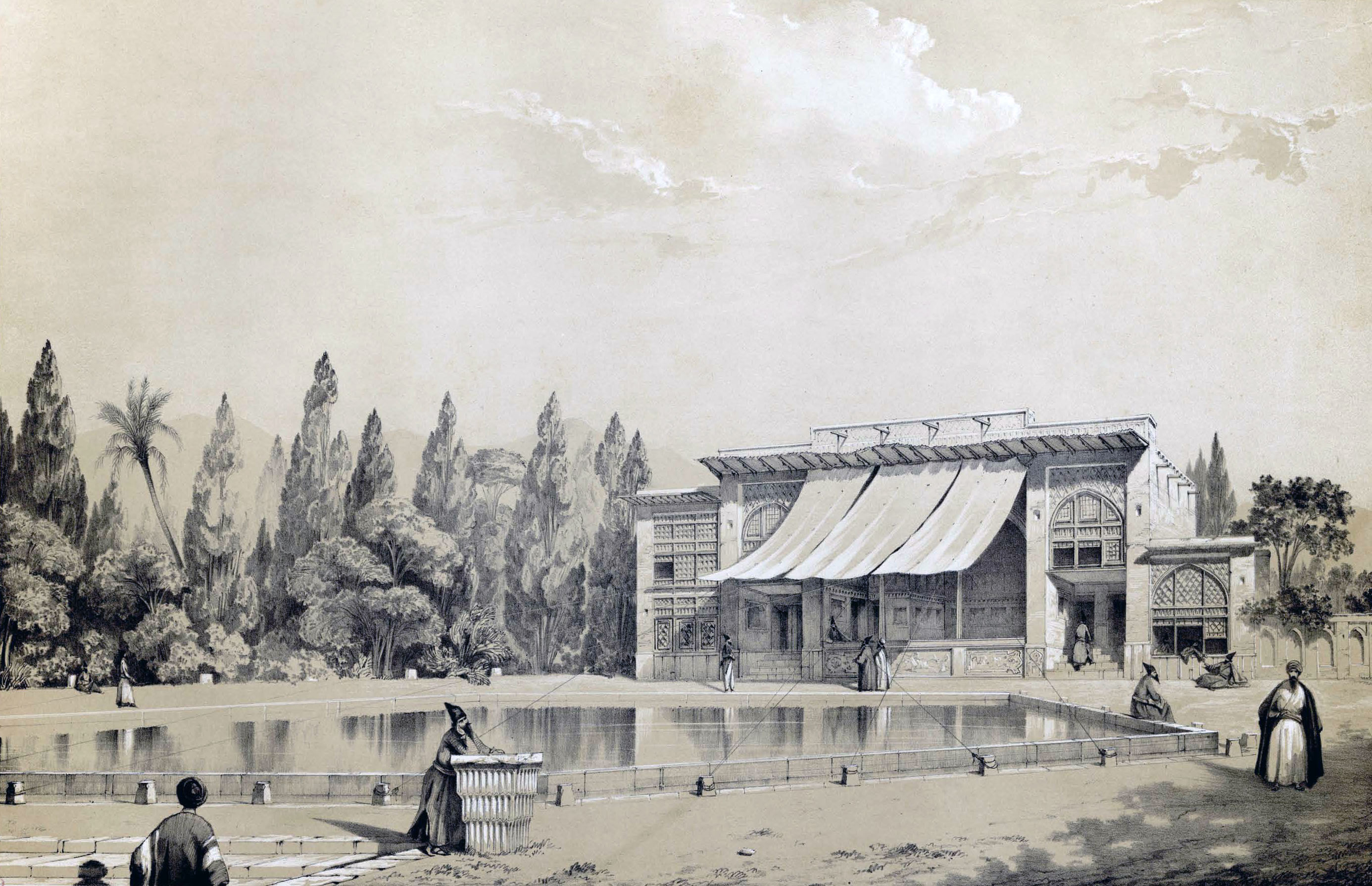
Nou Bagh Palace, Shiraz

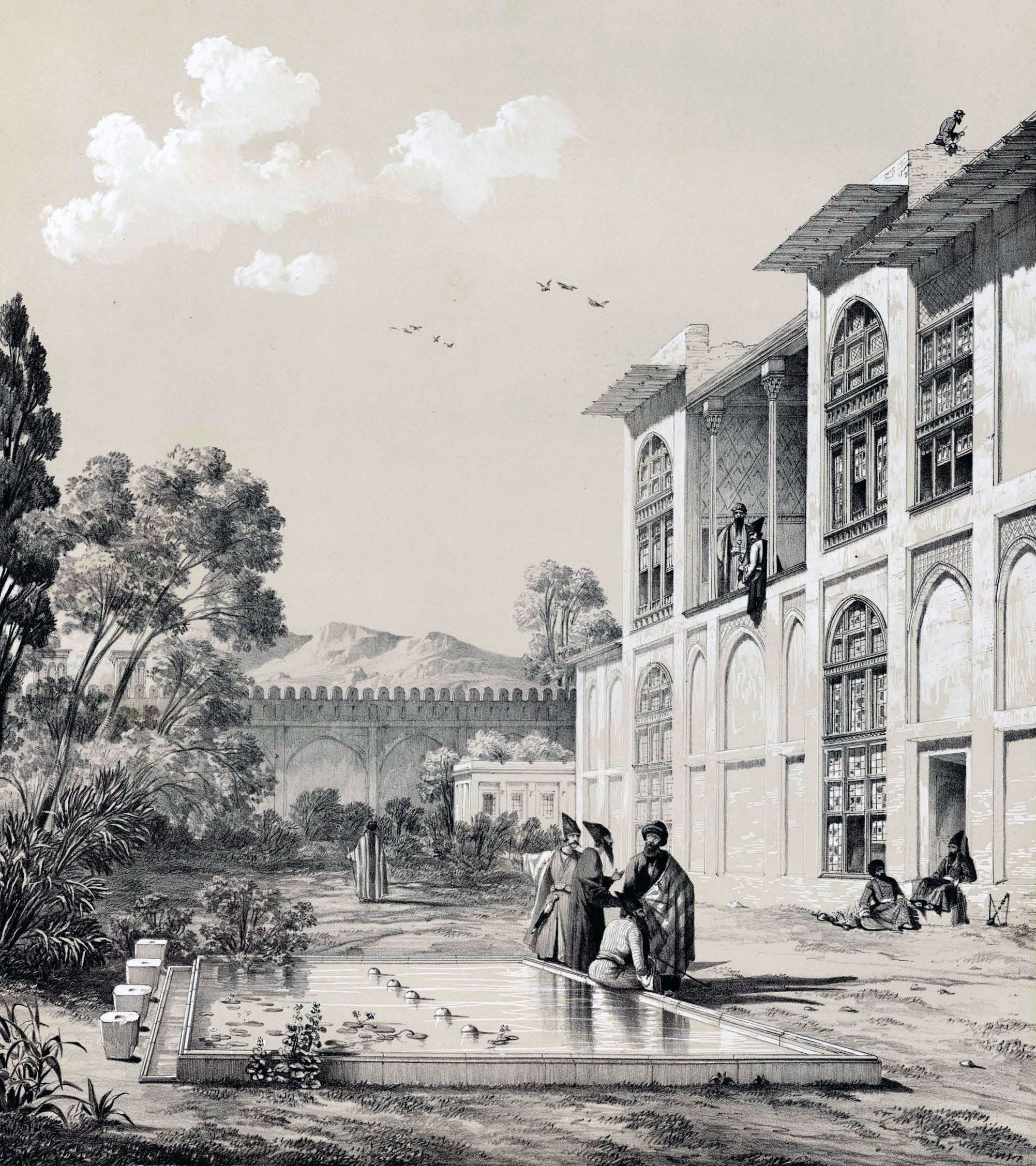
Arg of Karim Khan

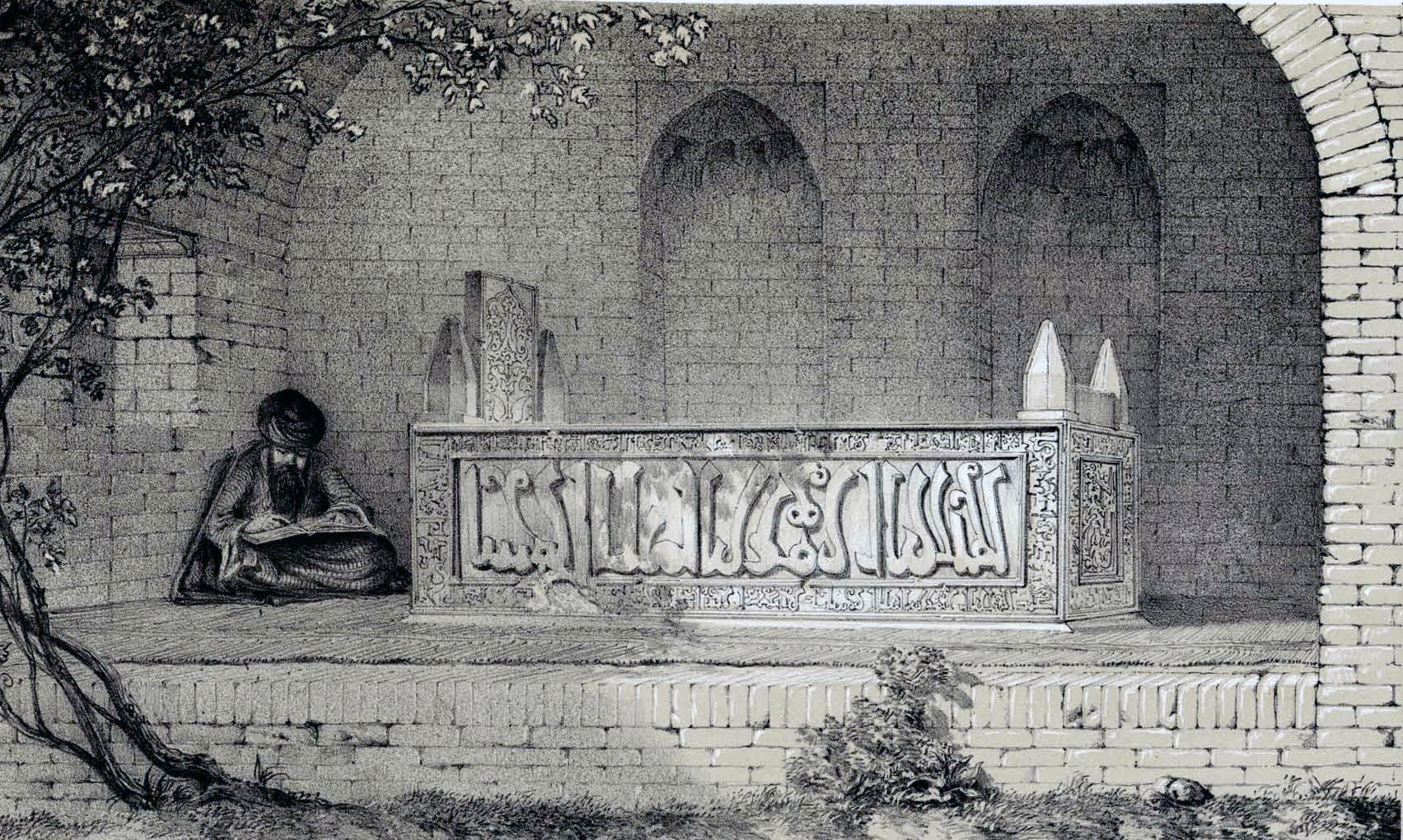
Tomb of Sheikh-Saadi, Shiraz

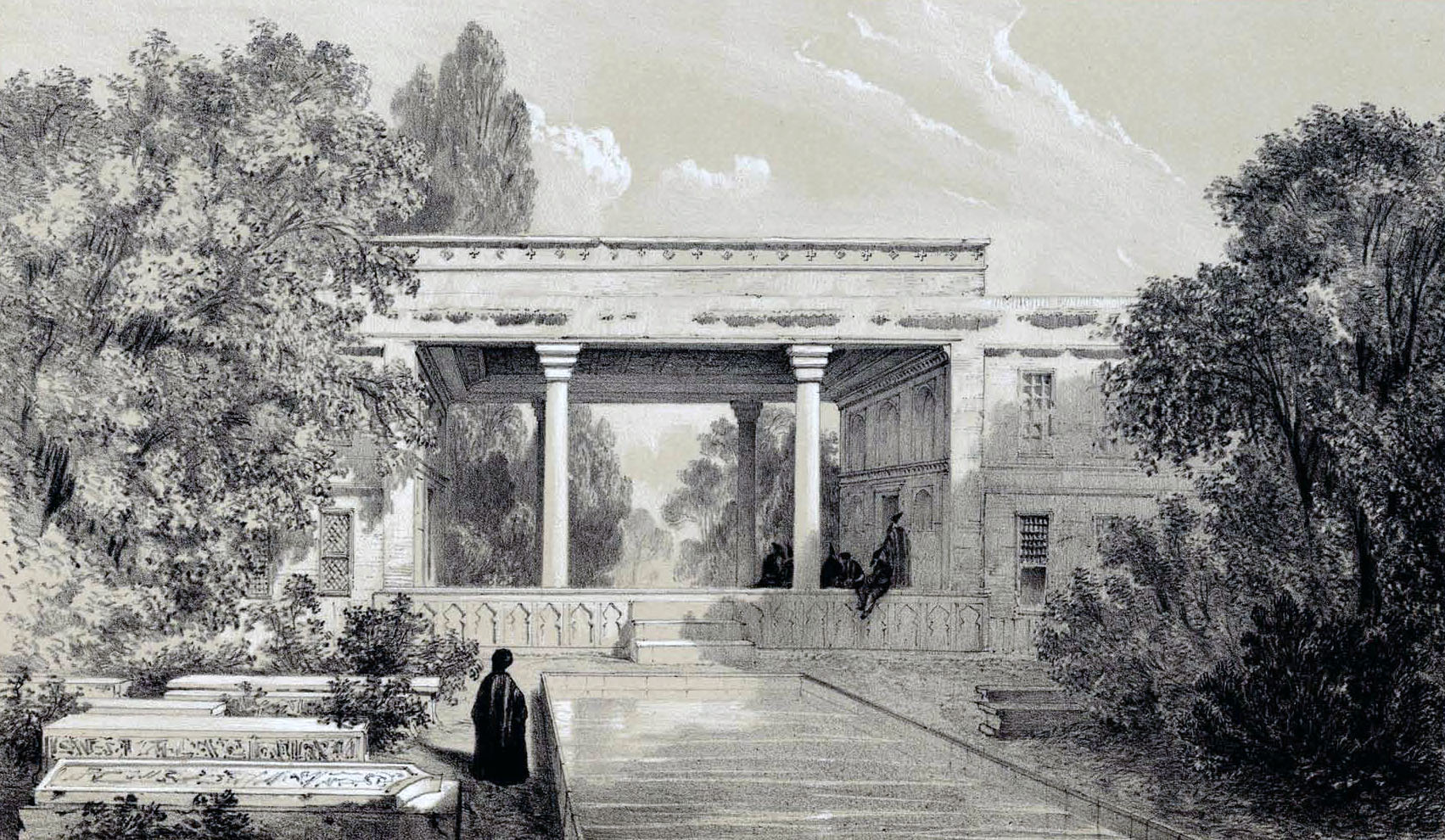
Tomb of the poet Hafez, Shiraz

=== Pascal Coste ===
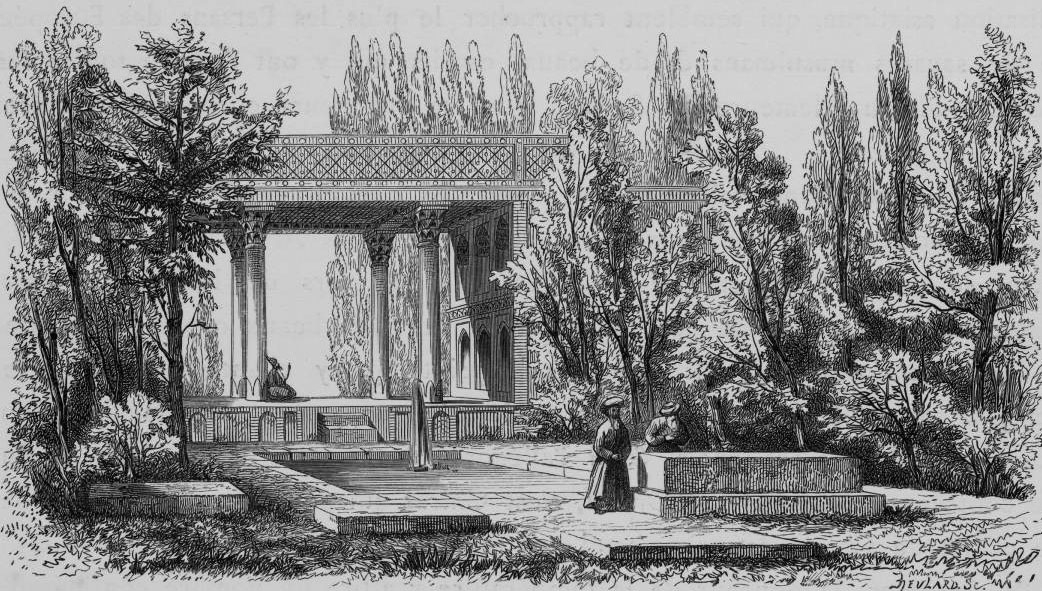
Tomb of Poet Hafez

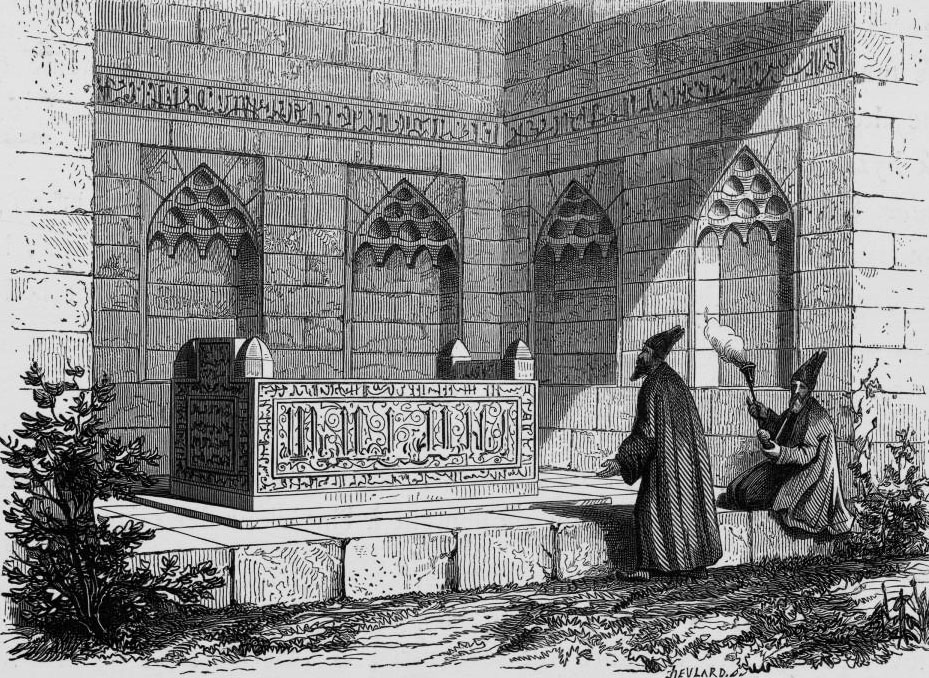
Tomb of Poet Saadi

== Naqsh-e Rustam; Persepolis; Pasargad ==
=== Eugène Flandin ===
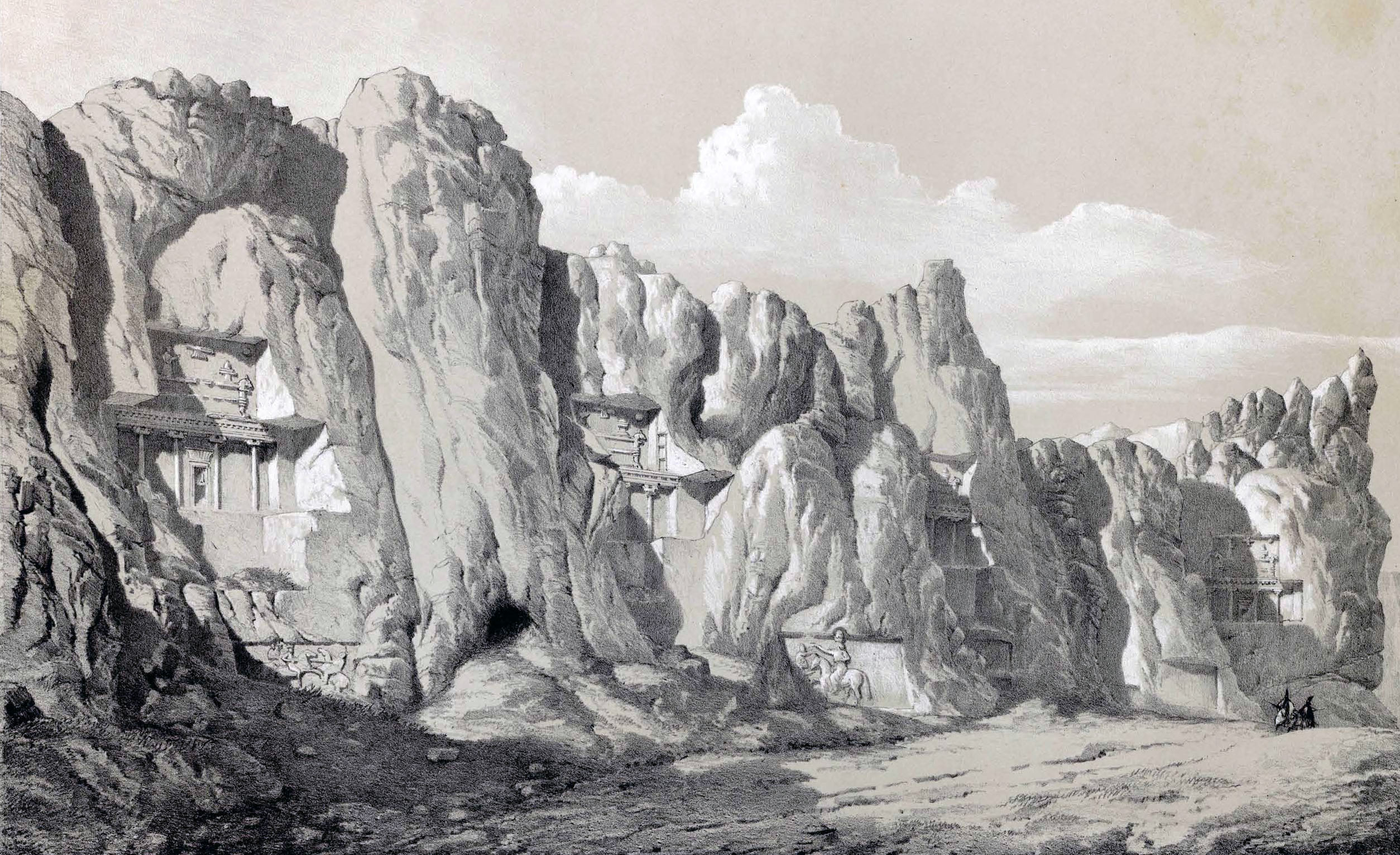
Burial vaults and reliefs Naqsh-e Rustam

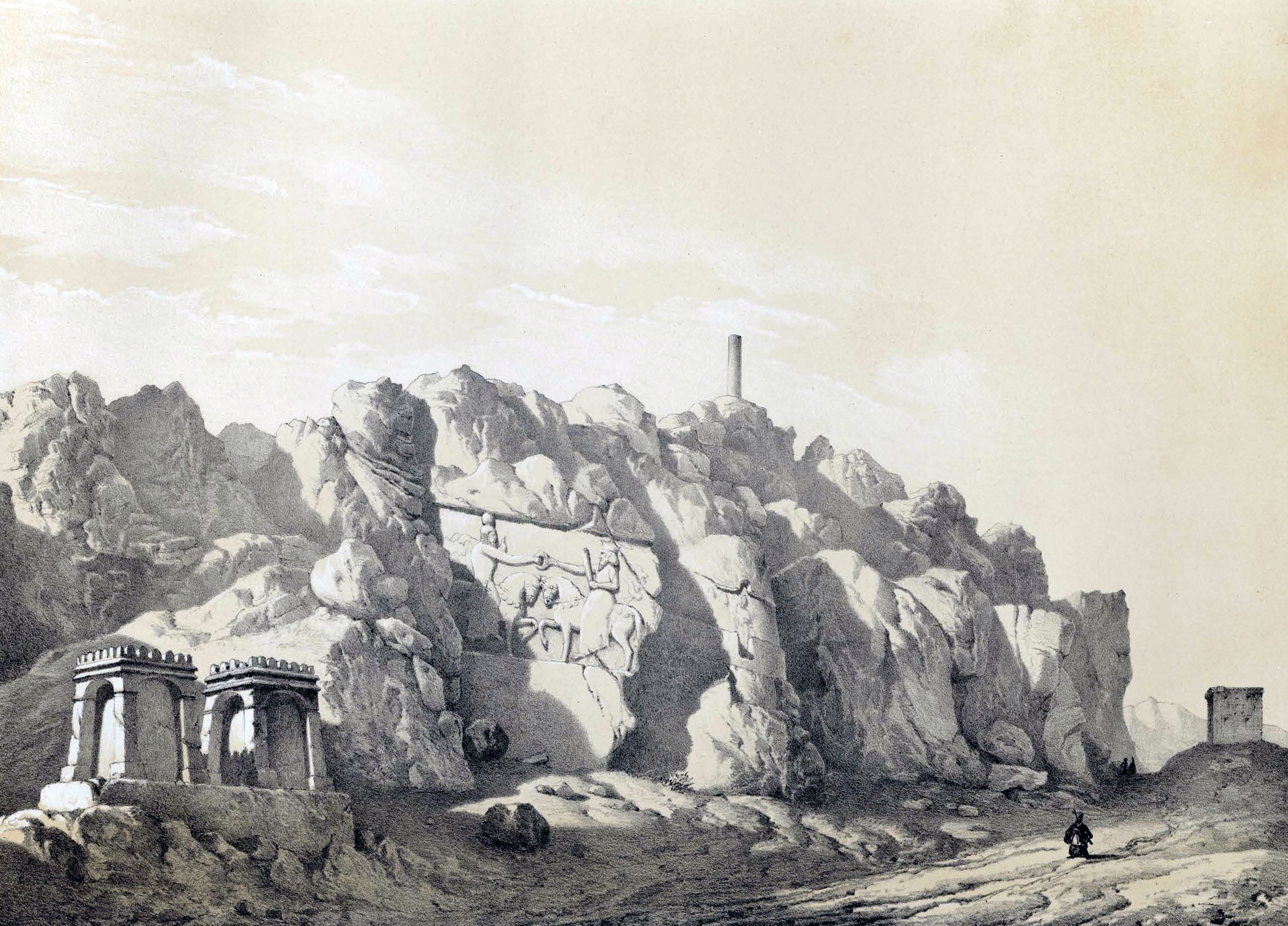
Rocks and carved altars Naqsh-e Rustam

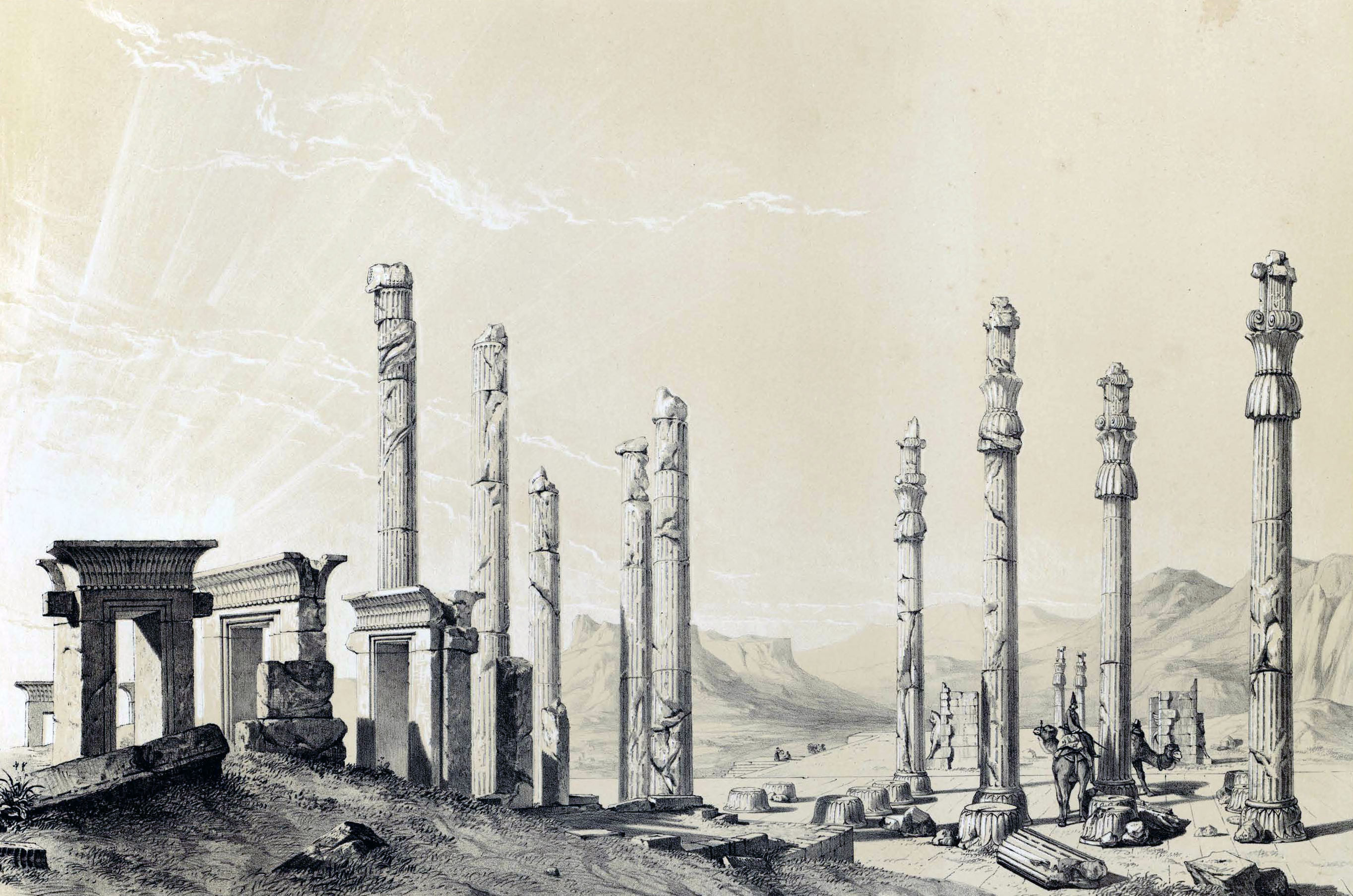
Persepolis, view the ruins

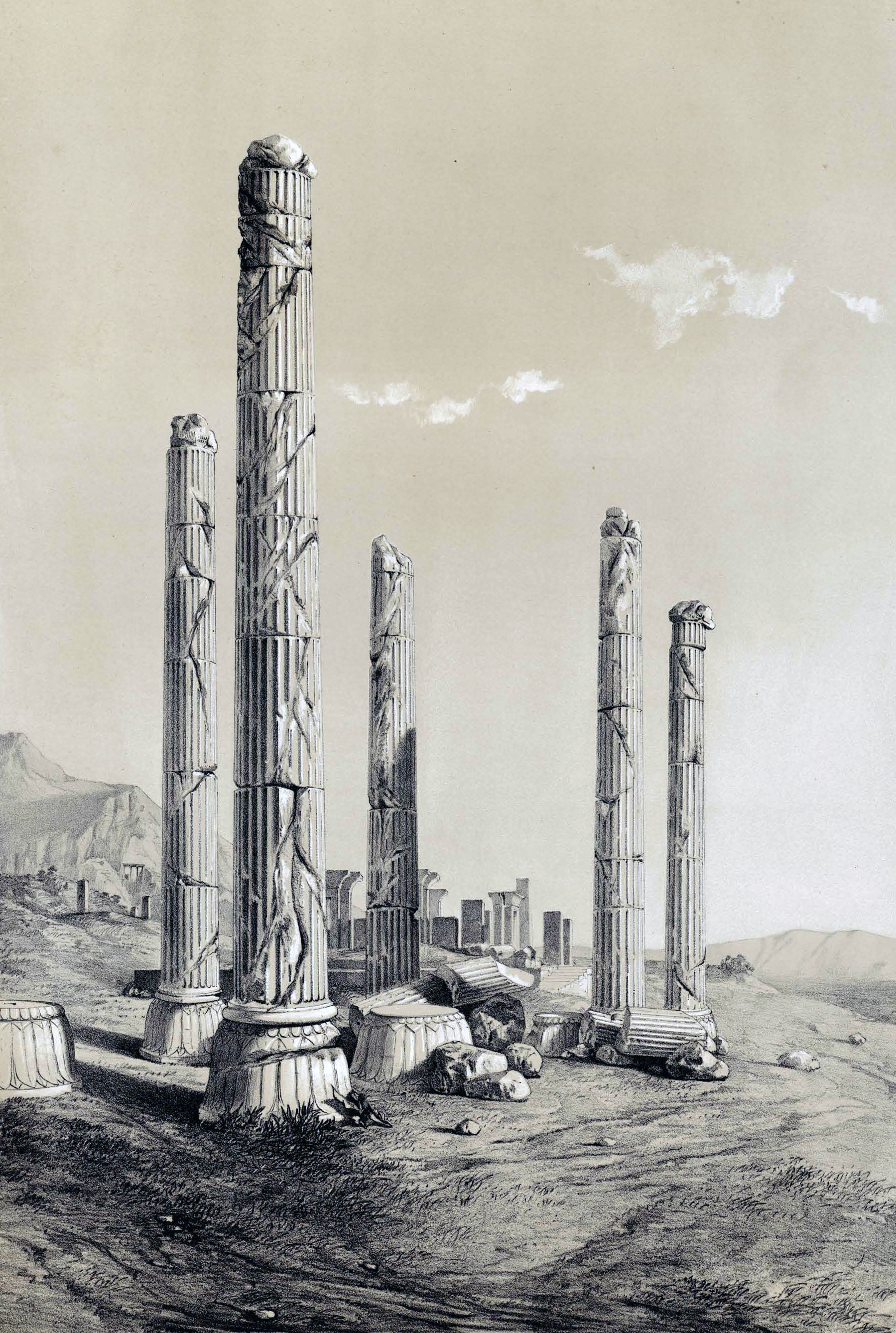
Persepolis, view the ruins

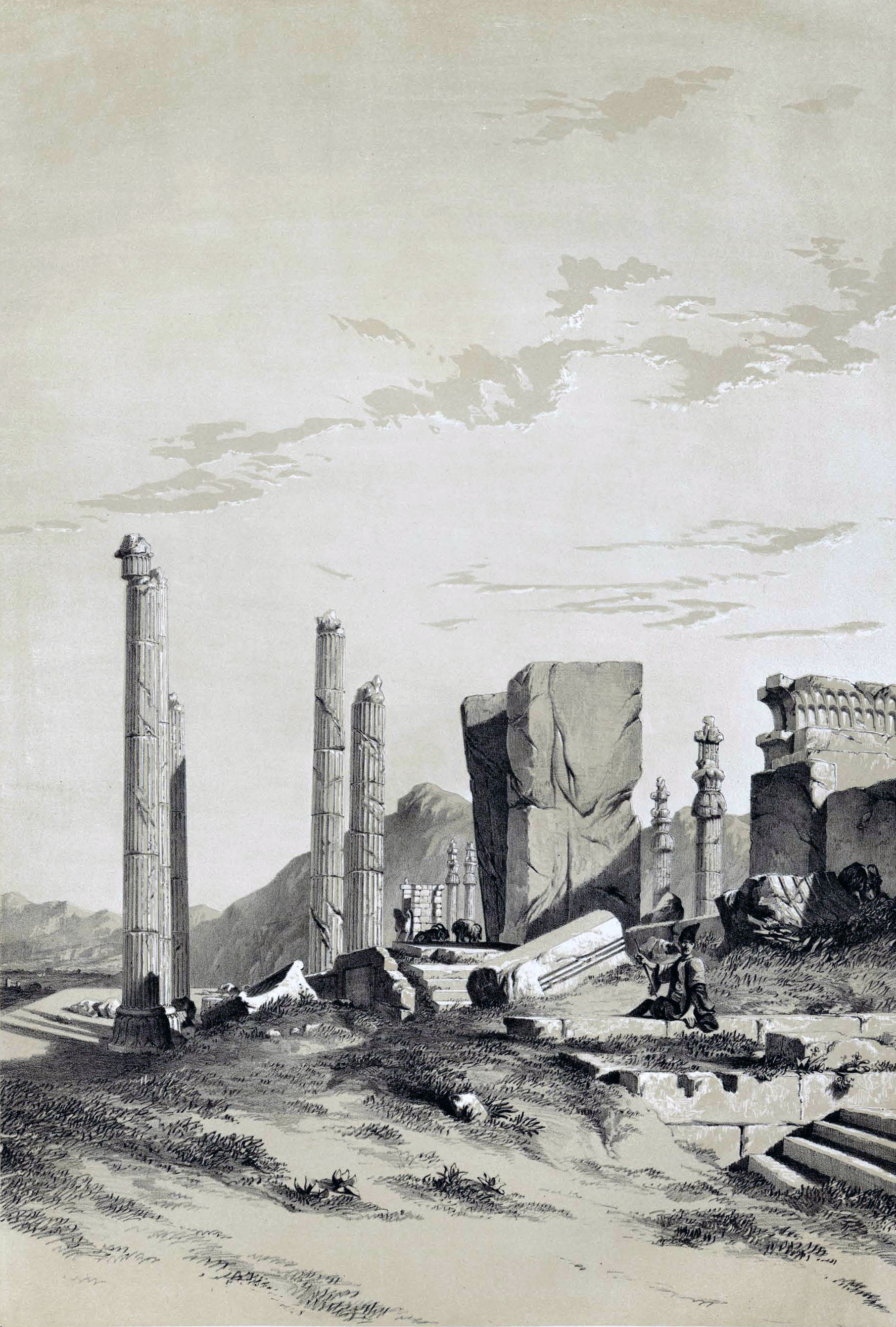
Persepolis, view the ruins

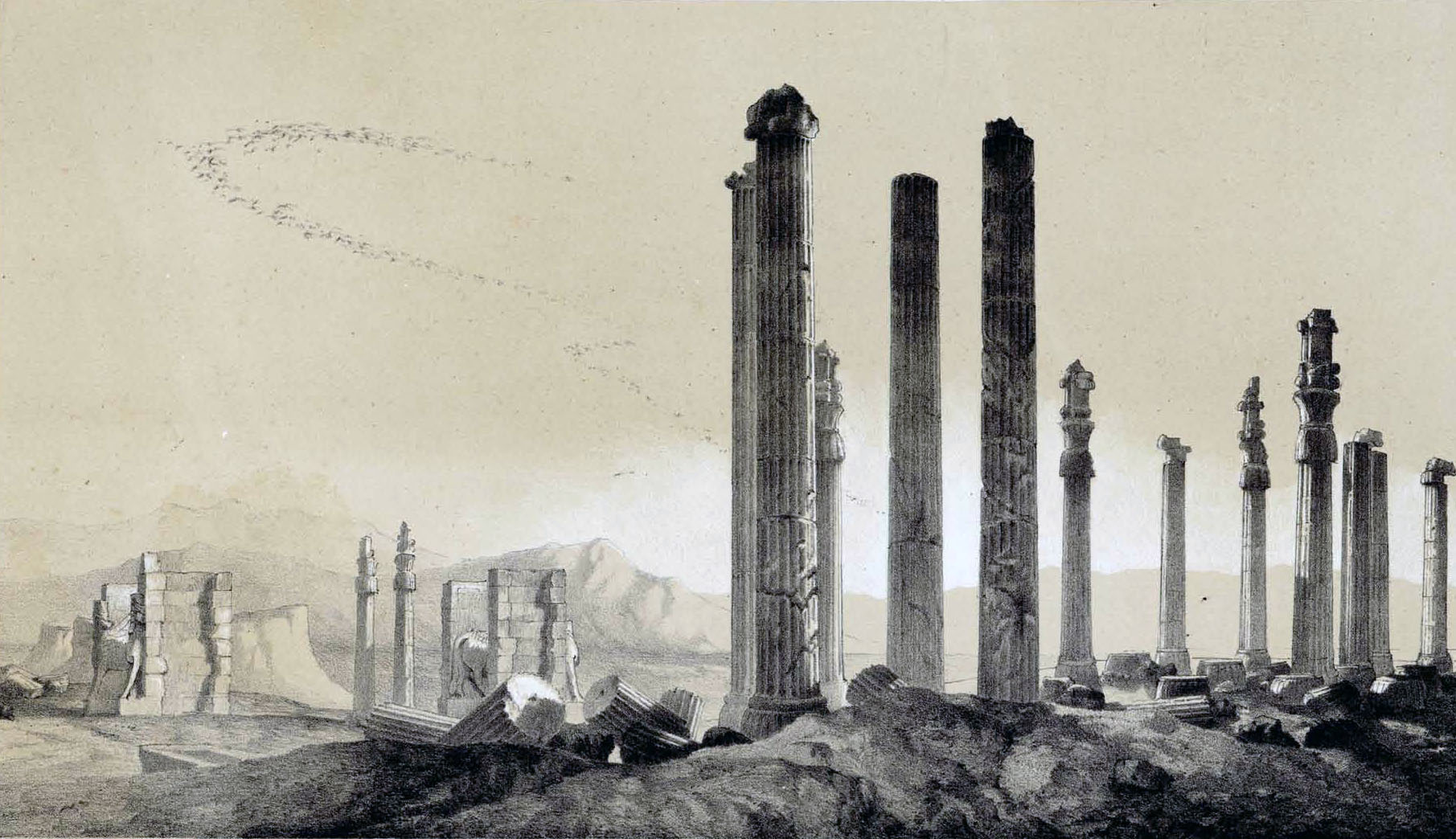
Persepolis, view the ruins

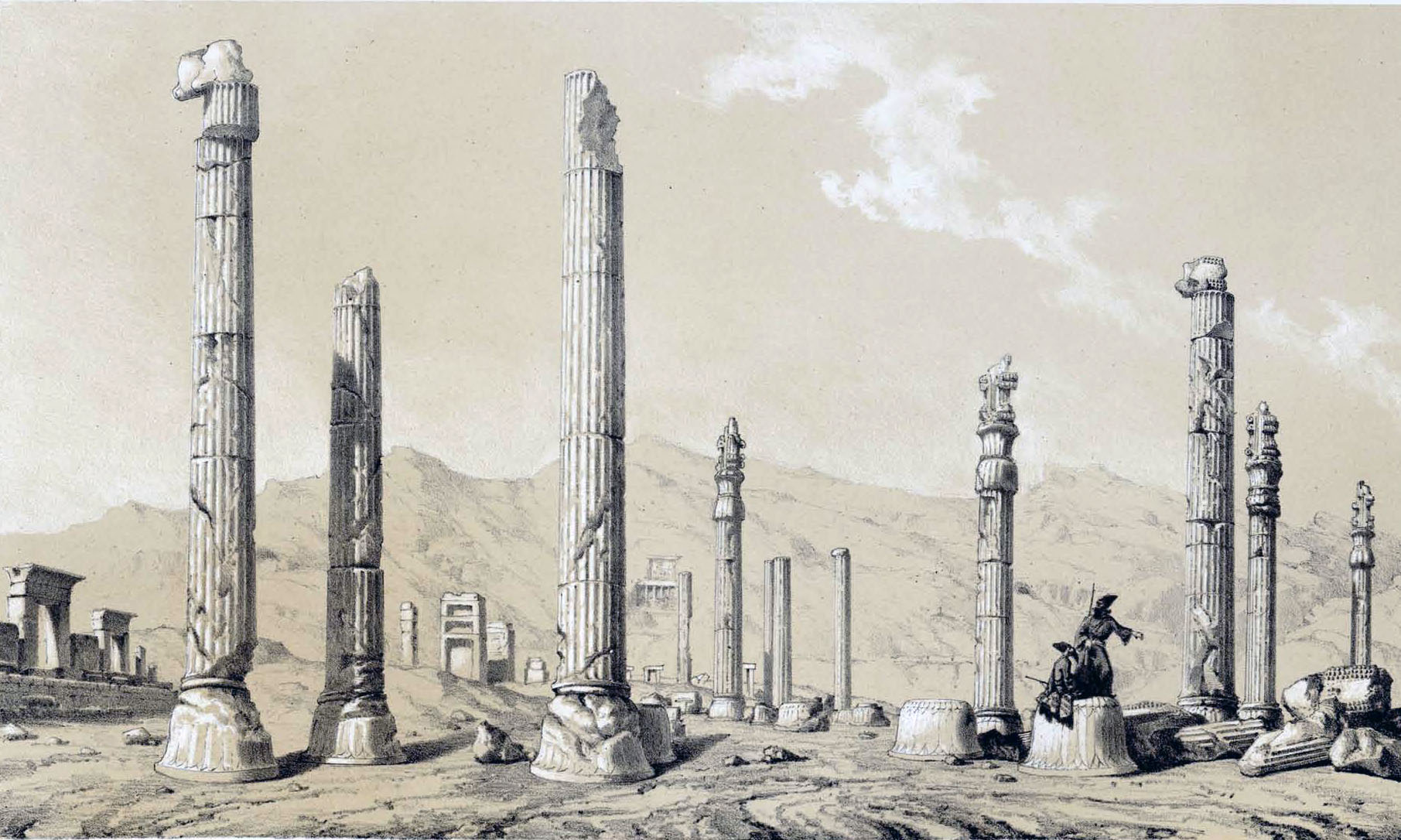
Persepolis, view the ruins

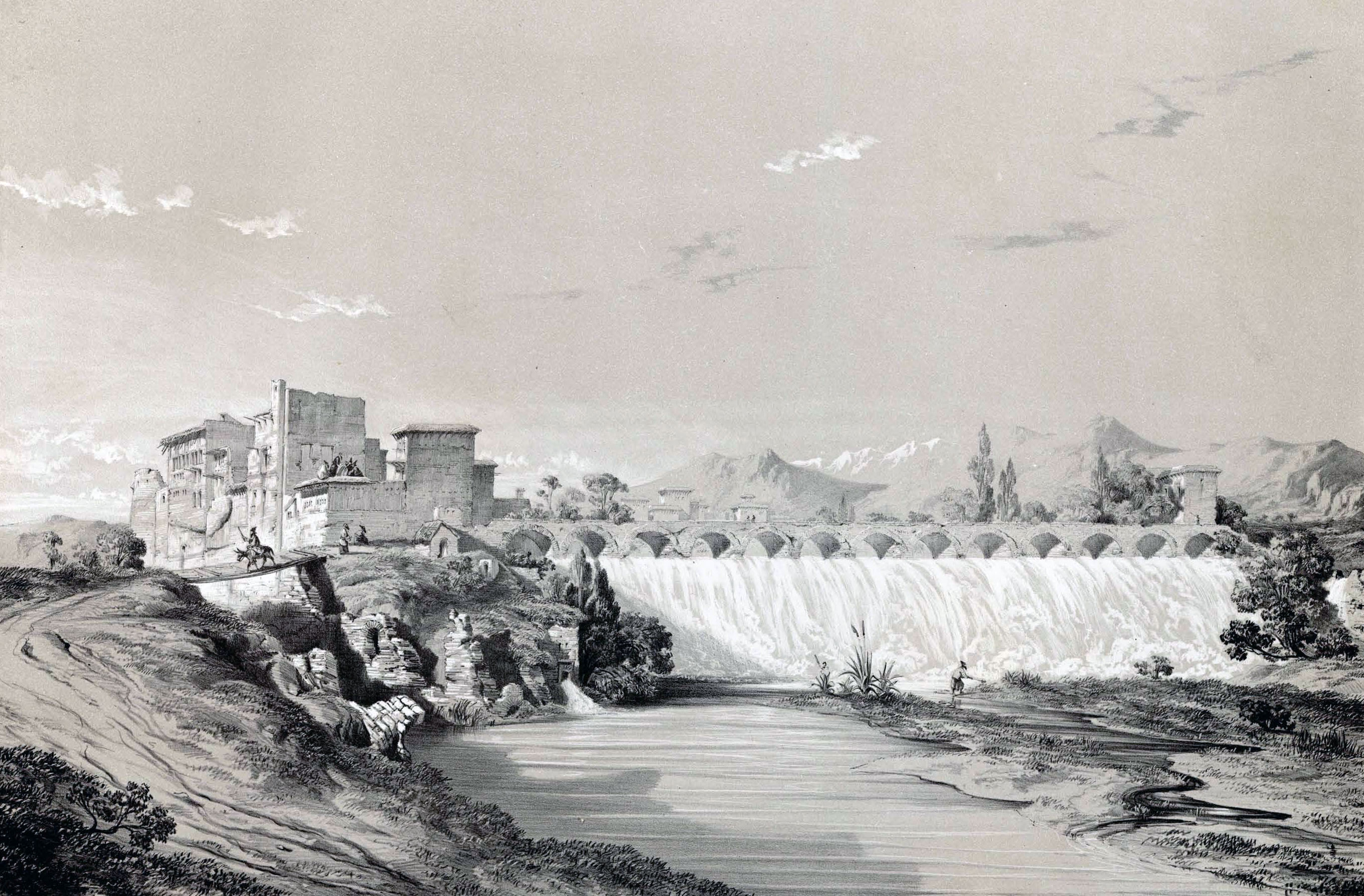
Fall of Band Amir plain of Persepolis

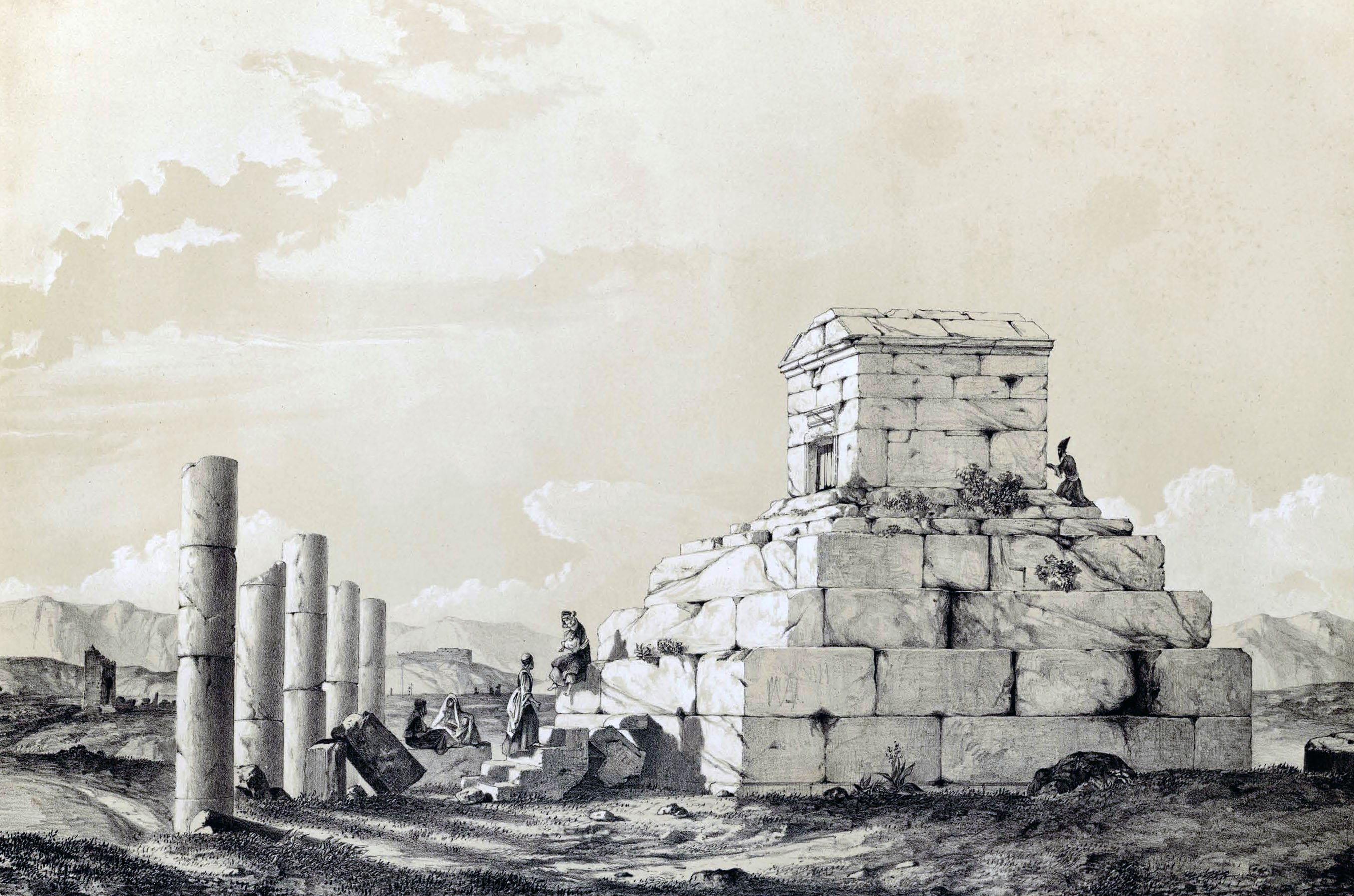
Ruins Pasargad Tomb of Cyrus said

== Bander Bushehr; Pir-a-Zan peak; Firouzabad; Kazerun; Darabgerd; Shushtar Province ==
=== Eugène Flandin ===
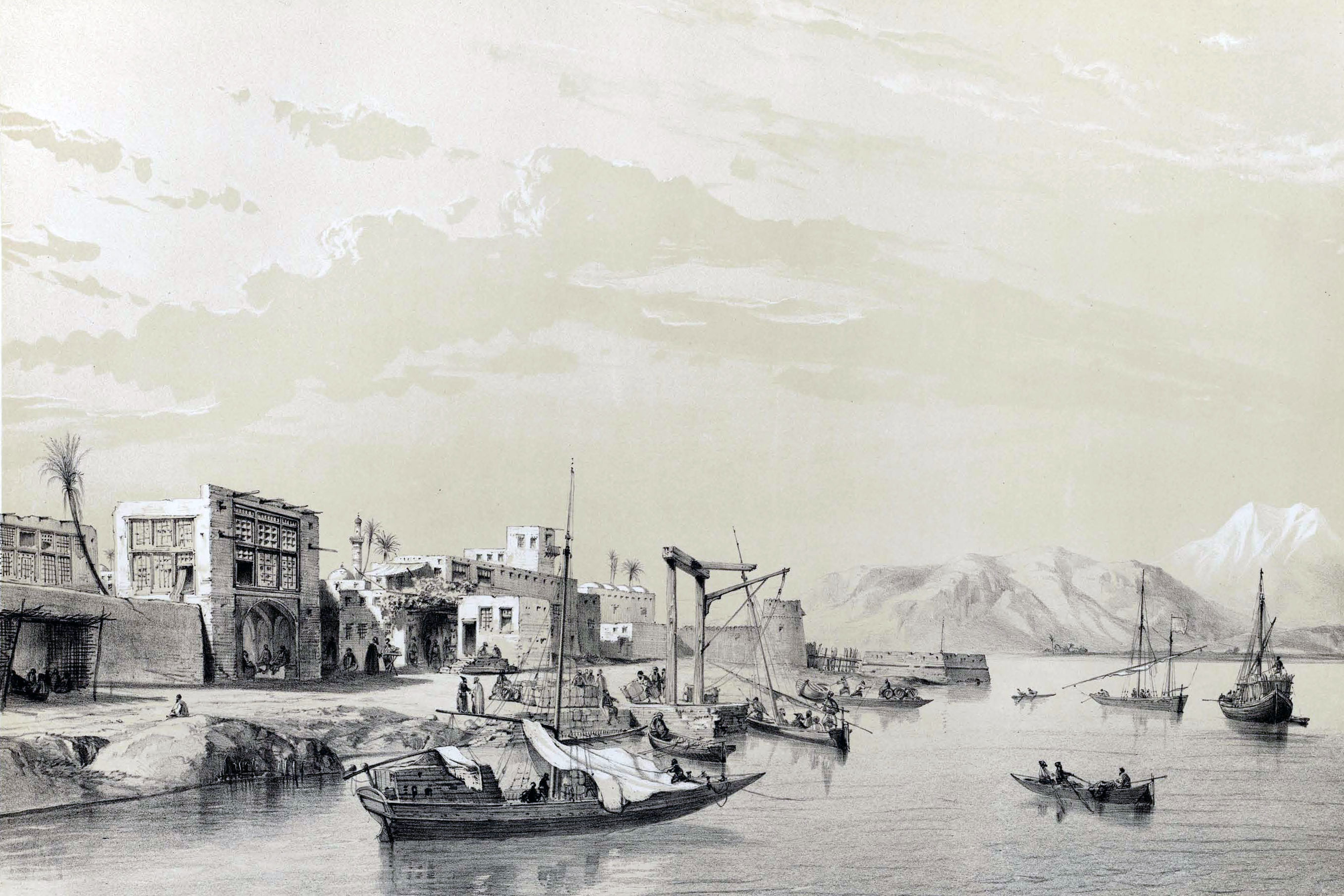
Bandar Bushehr (Persian Gulf)

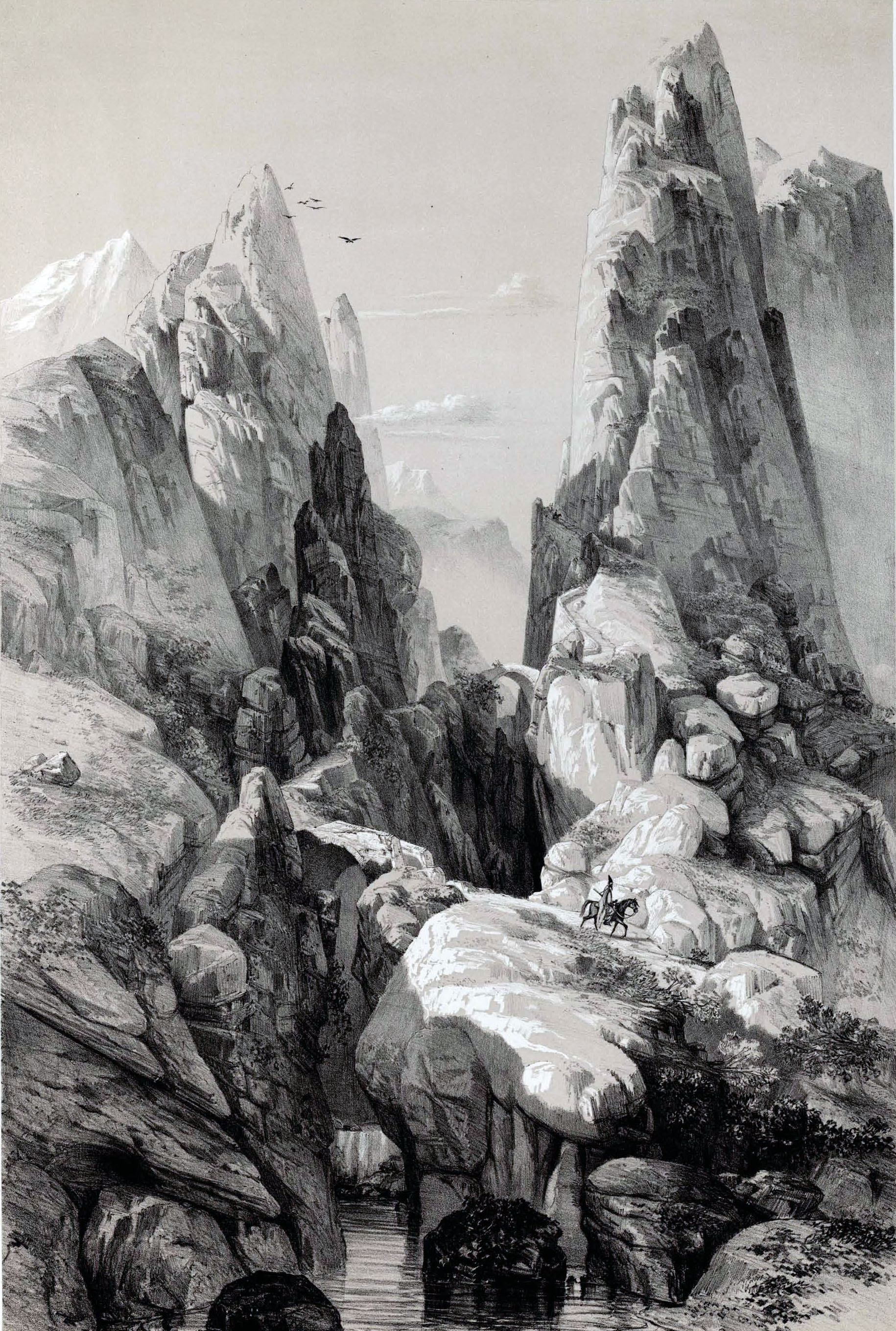
Defile Pir a zan

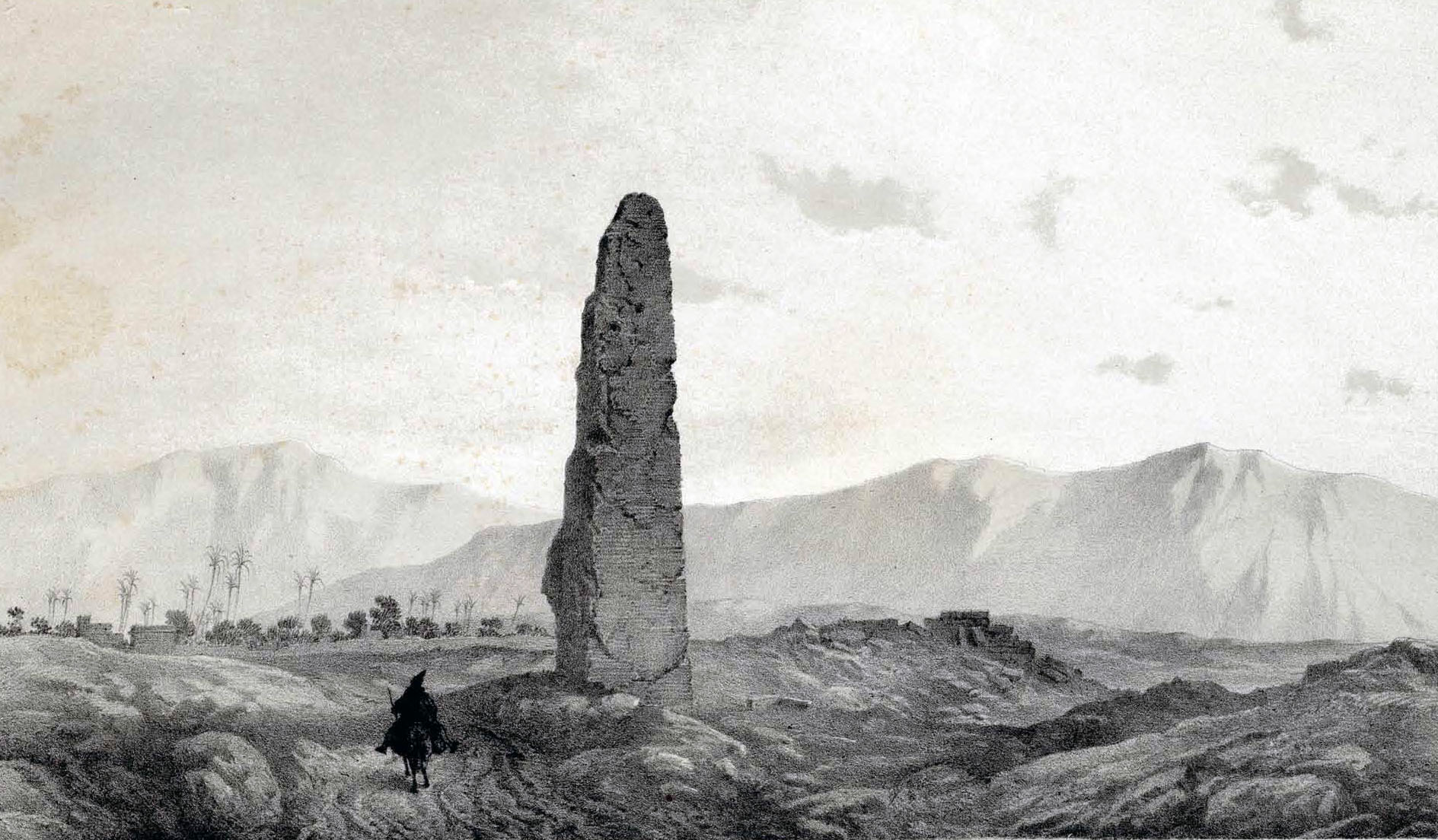
Ancient monument called Ateshgah or Altar of fire Firouzabad

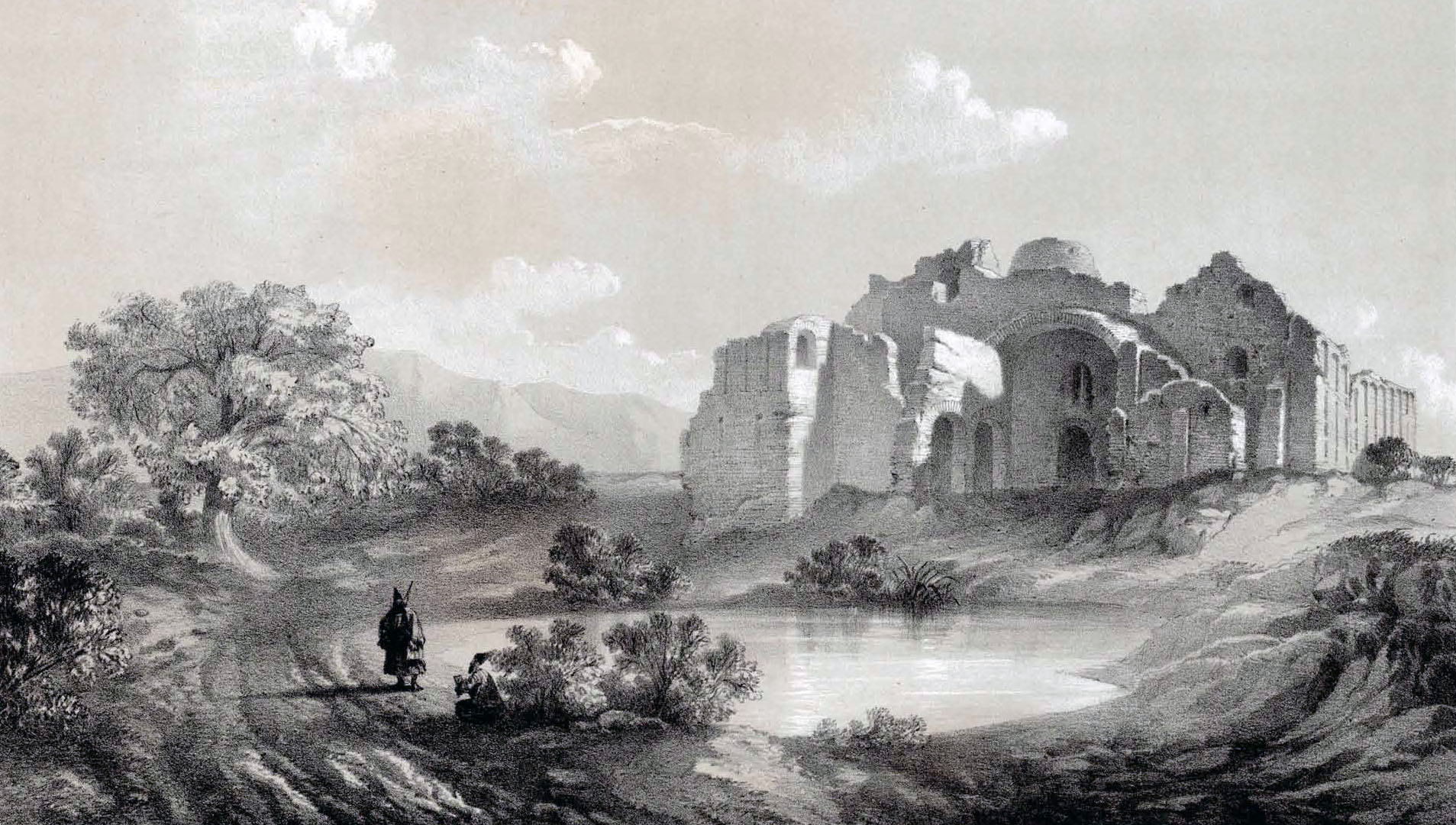
Ruins of a Sassanian Palace of Ardashir Firouzabad

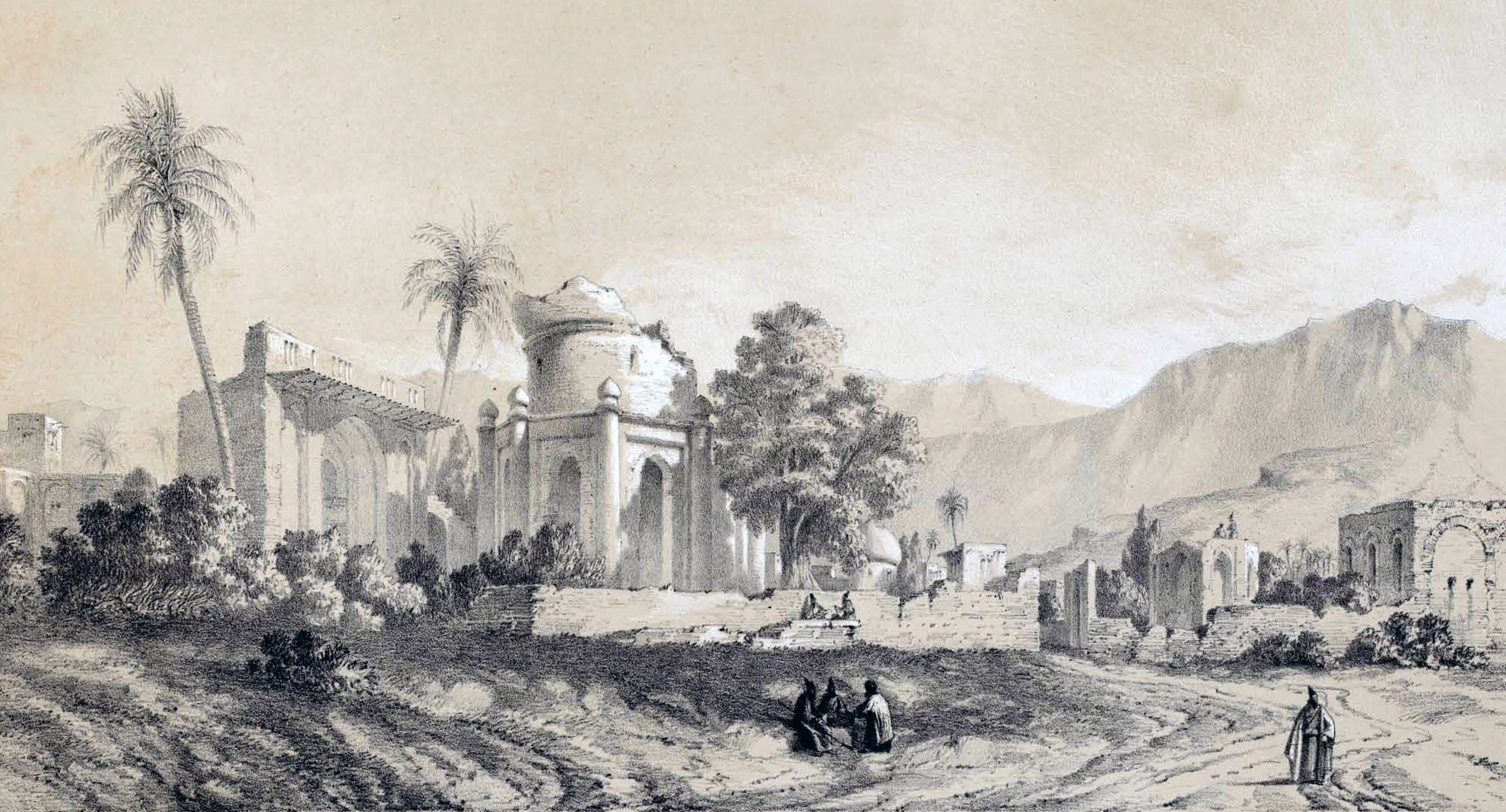
Bishapur

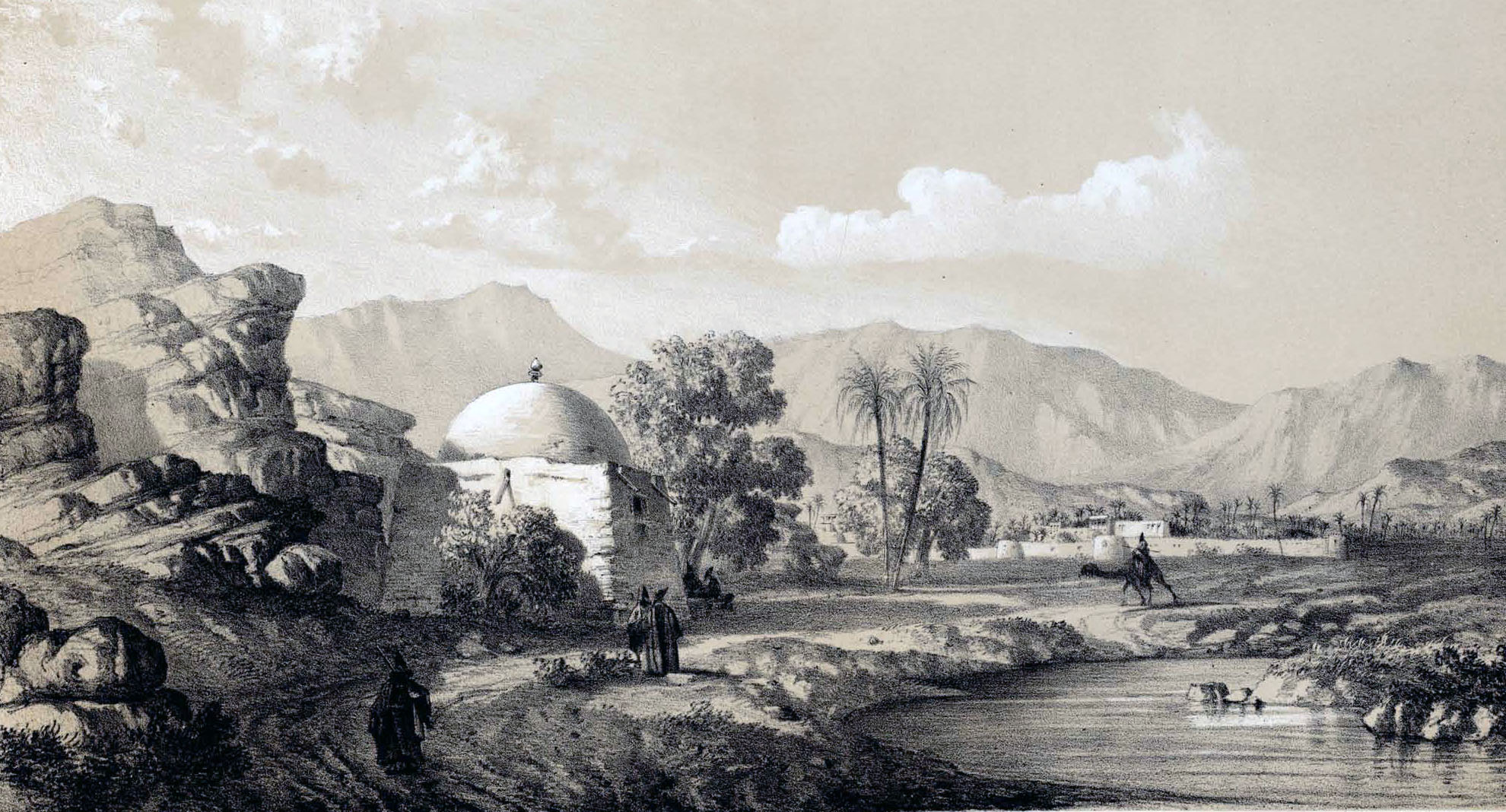
Darabgerd (Darab)

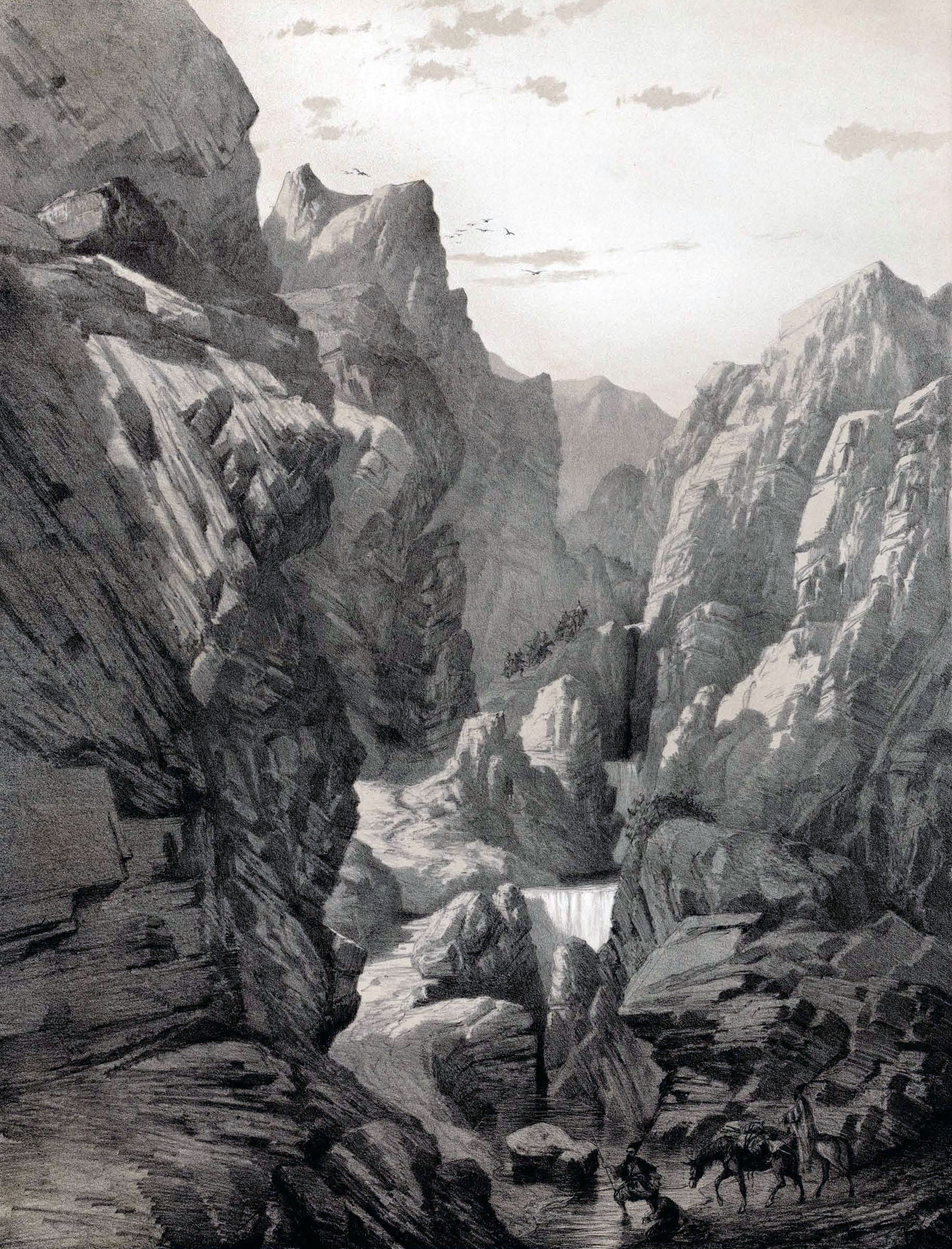
Gorge in the mountains of southern Fars province

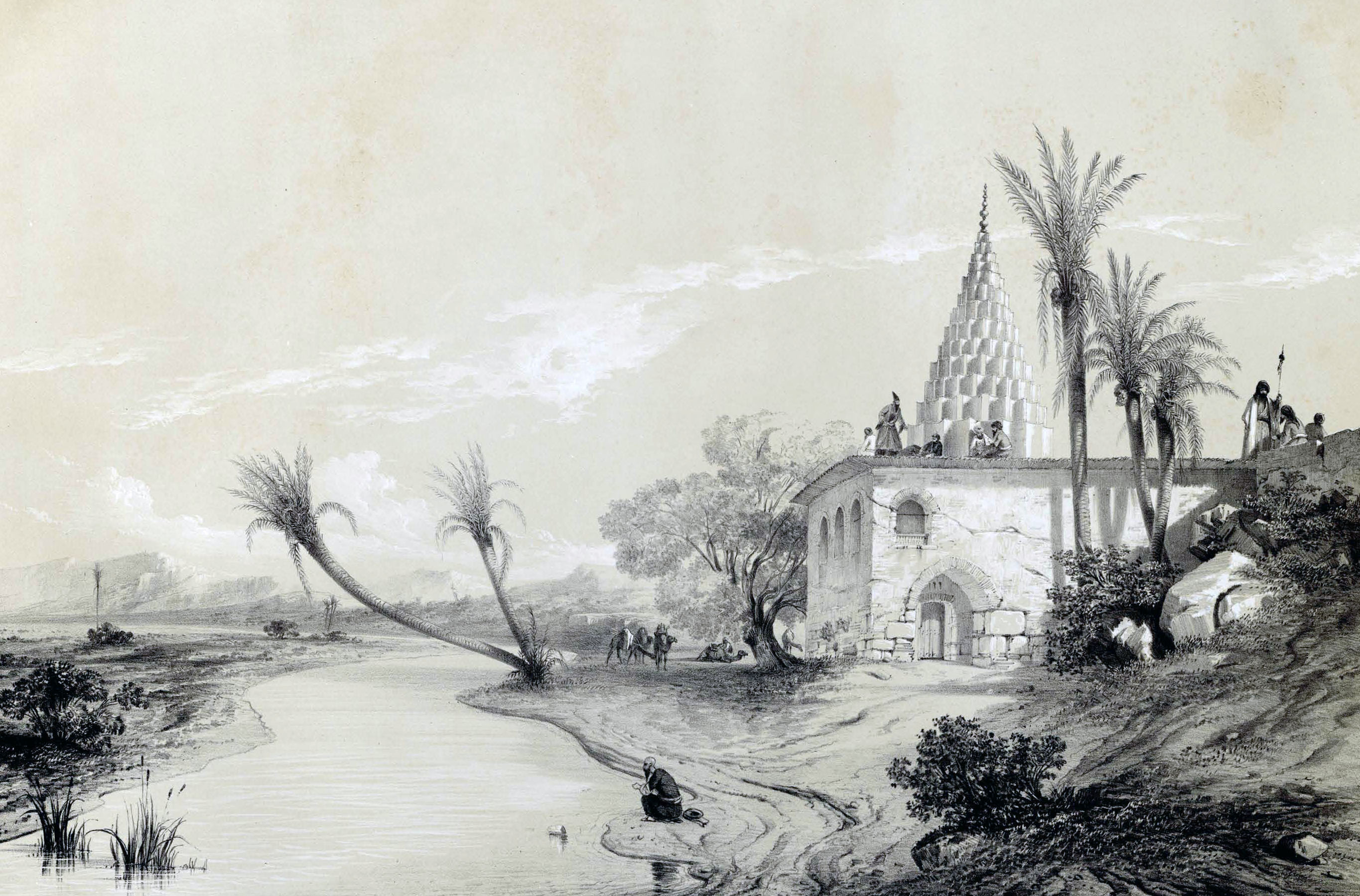
Tomb of Daniel, Shoush
