= Ladislas Farago =

Hungarian-American military historian and journalist (1906–1980)

Ladislas Faragó
- Born: Faragó László; September 21, 1906; Csurgó, Somogy County, Austria-Hungary (now Hungary)
- Died: October 15, 1980 (aged 74); New York City, New York, U.S.
- Occupation: Military Historian
- Years active: 1956–1980
- Known for: biography of George Patton
- Spouse: Liesel (Elizabeth Mroz) (m. 1934)
- Children: John M. Faragó
- Parent(s): Artúr and Irma Faragó (née Láng)

Ladislas Faragó (born László Faragó; September 21, 1906 – October 15, 1980) was a Hungarian and American military historian, journalist, and author best known for his best-selling books on history and espionage, particularly focusing on World War II. Born in Austria-Hungary, he later worked extensively in the United States, including serving as an intelligence analyst for the U.S. Navy during World War II.

== Biography and work ==
Born to Jewish parents in Csurgó, Austria-Hungary, Farago began his career as a reporter in Budapest, writing for the evening newspaper Az Est and the theater/film magazine Szinházi Élet. He later worked in Berlin as a freelance journalist for The New York Times before relocating to London and eventually the United States. During this period, he covered the Second Italo-Ethiopian War for a London-based publication, earning recognition for his vivid and widely read reporting. His 1937 book Palestine at the Crossroads, based on his observations in the region, was referenced in The Diary of a Young Girl in her entry for Thursday, May 11, 1944.

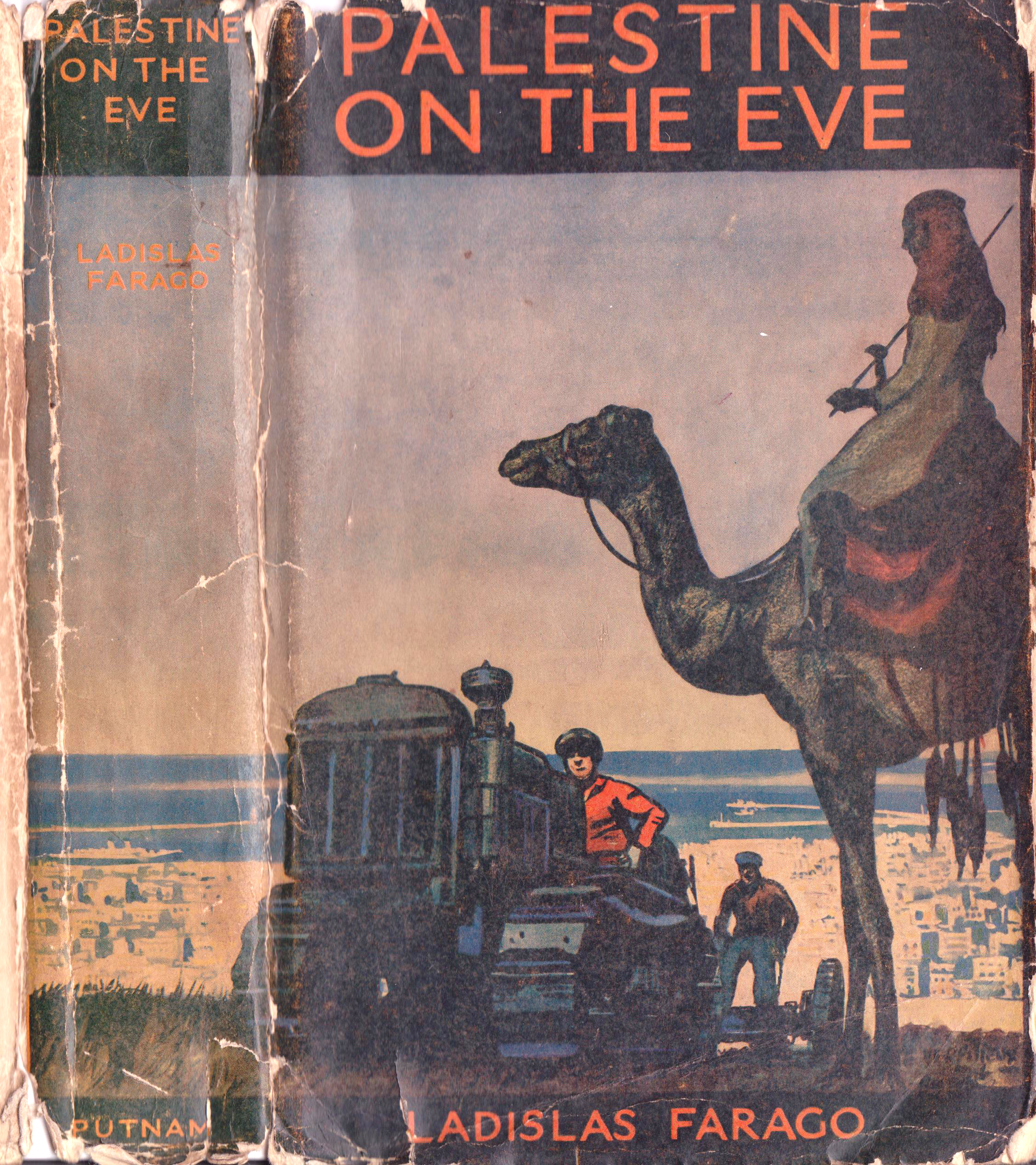
Book Cover: Palestine on the Eve. Published 1936

Farago moved to the USA prior to the outbreak of World War II where he initially worked as a freelance journalist. In 1941, Farago served on the board of trustees for the Committee for National Morale, a non-profit research committee composed of over 160 scholars and specialists studying national morale. The committee, commissioned by a Cabinet Sub-Committee of the President of the United States, produced a 500-page report with recommendations, along with other studies and "confidential projects" for government and private agencies. Farago was part of the sub-committees on Military Science & History and Foreign Affairs. One of his contributions, in collaboration with two Harvard professors, was a 334-page study entitled German Psychological Warfare, which analyzed Nazi psychological warfare tactics. The study was described by the committee's Chairman, Arthur Upham Pope, as an "important contribution toward the better understanding of this war."

=== Military intelligence career ===
Following his work on German Psychological Warfare, Farago joined the U.S. Office of Naval Intelligence (ONI), where he served from 1942 to 1946. While details of his service remain limited, his publisher described him as "Chief of Research and Planning" within ONI, specializing in U-boat intelligence. Additionally, the New York Herald Tribune referred to him as "Chief of Research and Planning in the U.S. Navy's Special Warfare Branch." During this time, he was staff to the drafting of the Potsdam Declaration.

=== Military historian ===
After World War II, Farago worked for the UN-related diplomatic newsletter United Nations World, for Corps Diplomatique, and as a freelance journalist, eventually coming to join the staff of Radio Free Europe where he focused on supporting the brewing insurrection in Hungary in 1955–56 by developing a series of radio broadcasts featuring an apocryphal saboteur named Colonel Bell (Bell was subsequently identified by the Soviets as one of the contributors to the unrest that became the 1956 Revolution).

During the 1950s and 1960s Farago wrote popular histories of espionage (War of Wits, Burn After Reading) and ghost wrote two books for Admiral Ellis Zacharias (Secret Missions and Behind Closed Doors); he also consulted on The Man Called X, the TV series based on Zacharaias' book.

In 1963 he published Patton: Ordeal and Triumph, the bestseller that formed, in part, the basis for the film Patton and in 1964 published It's Your Money, about waste and mismanagement in government spending. In 1967 he published The Broken Seal, one of the bases for the film Tora! Tora! Tora!. Faragó also appeared as a contestant on the January 22, 1957, episode of To Tell the Truth.

==== Aftermath ====
Faragó's most controversial book, Aftermath: The Search for Martin Bormann, described his research tracking down a wide range of Nazi war criminals as they fled Germany subsequent to the collapse of the Third Reich, especially to South America. Originally an extended series in the London Daily Express and the Chicago Tribune, the book was released to both widespread acclaim and significant skepticism. The book was based on both Faragó's own personal investigation and interviews in South America and Argentinian intelligence documents (some of which are provided in the book), the veracity of which was attested to by attorney Joel Weinberg.

The British historian Stephen Dorril, in his MI6 Inside the Covert World of Her Majesty's Secret Intelligence Service asserts that Faragó was the 'most successful disinformer or dupe' concerning the presence of Nazis in South America. The original text is as follows:

Investigating 'The Nazi Menace in Argentina', author Ronald Newton found that the historic record had been left 'booby-trapped with an extraordinary number of hoaxes, forgeries, unanswered propaganda ploys and assorted dirty tricks'. The most successful disinformer or dupe was the American Ladislas Faragó, 'a somewhat Hemingway-esque figure with a strong Hungarian accent and a confidential manner', whose 'good connections with the CIA and secret services of several European countries enabled him to investigate and publish on a non-attributable basis' a series of half correct tales.

However, French Resistance operative and conservative polemicist Pierre de Villemarest justified some of Faragó's statements. Villemarest disagreed on the details of Bormann's survival, but agreed he did survive the escape from Hitler's Bunker. Villemarest states that Bormann was not a mere Soviet agent (like Heinrich Müller) but was smart enough to get free (after a few months or years) from the Soviets' 'protection'.

Faragó's belief that Bormann survived the Second World War was definitively discredited when the latter's body was unearthed in Berlin in 1973, and confirmed to be his by DNA evidence in 1998. None of Farago's material and reporting about other expatriate Nazis, including the role of the Vatican in assisting some of them, has ever been significantly challenged.

=== Death ===
Faragó died of cancer in 1980. He lived in New York and Connecticut at the time of his death. His papers are maintained in the 20th Century Archive at Boston University. He was Jewish. His son, John M. Farago, an administrative law judge and a co-author of the humor book Junk Food, was one of four founding faculty members, and is an emeritus professor of law, at the City University of New York School of Law.

== Selected bibliography ==
- Abyssinia on the Eve (1935)
- Abyssinian Stop Press (ed.) (1936)
- Palestine on the Eve (UK 1936), also published as Palestine at the Crossroads (US 1937)
- The Riddle of Arabia (1939)
- Burn After Reading (1961)
- Strictly from Hungary (1962/2004)
- The Tenth Fleet (1962)
- War of Wits (1962)
- Patton: Ordeal and Triumph (1963)
- The Broken Seal: "Operation Magic" and the Secret Road to Pearl Harbor (1967)
- The Game of the Foxes (1971)
- Spymaster (1972)
- Aftermath: The Search for Martin Bormann (1974)
- The Last Days of Patton (1981)
