= Bertha Damon =

American humorist, author, lecturer, and editor

- Born: Bertha Louise Clark; January 4, 1881; Chester, Connecticut, U.S.
- Died: June 18, 1975; El Cerrito, California
- Other name: Bertha Clark Pope
- Education: Pembroke College
- Spouse(s): Arthur Upham Pope (m. 1909–c. 1920; divorced), Lindsay Todd Damon (m. 1928–1940; death)

Bertha Clark Pope Damon (1881–1975) was an American humorist, author, lecturer, and editor. She wrote the best-selling humorous memoir Grandma Called It Carnal.

The composer Ernst Bacon dedicated two songs to Bertha Damon. Benjamin Lehman, English professor at the University of California, Berkeley, said she “had a real talent for gathering people around her, and that she "was so great a wit that we were all delighted periodically into really uncontrolled laughter.” Well-known writers who were part of her circle include Stella Benson, Witter Bynner, Oscar Lewis, Winfield Townley Scott, and Marie de Laveaga Welch. She was also active in the Sierra Club and wrote accounts of some of its camping trips for the Sierra Club Bulletin.

== Biography ==
Bertha Louise Clark was born in a small town, Chester, Connecticut, in 1881. After her mother died in 1892 she and her sister lived with their grandmother. She attended high school at Northfield Seminary. After graduating from Pembroke College in Brown University in 1905 and teaching school in Providence, Rhode Island briefly, she married Arthur Upham Pope in 1909, who had graduated from Brown in 1904 and was soon hired to teach philosophy there. Pope did graduate work at Brown, Cornell and Harvard. In 1910 the couple moved to Berkeley, California; where he taught at the University of California, Berkeley. During the 1915–16 school year Bertha taught English at Oakland Technical High School. Discovery of Arthur Pope's affair with student Phyllis Ackerman (who later became his second wife) led to his resignation from the university and a divorce from Bertha around 1920. Bertha continued to live in the Tudor-style house they had purchased after its use at the Panama–Pacific International Exposition. She sometimes had long-term guests and boarders, including Peter Case and Stella Benson, in that house, which she named "High Acres."

She became a close friend of Albert M. Bender, who was treasurer and publications chair of the Book Club of California. Bertha held a part-time job as the first paid secretary of the Book Club during 1920, and she edited and wrote an introduction to The Letters of Ambrose Bierce, published by the club in 1922.

After a trip to Europe in 1922, she opened the Old World Shop in Berkeley, selling European antiques and Oriental rugs until 1925. She owned a series of homes in the East Bay in the 1920s. As she told it in her author biographies, "Bertha Damon has earned her living in various ways, the most interesting to her being the successful building and remodeling of houses, though she had no formal training as an architect." In 1925 she had a Mediterranean-style house built on Eagle Hill in Kensington, California, which she sold to J. Robert Oppenheimer and his wife in the summer of 1941, while he was working on the Manhattan Project. Another home she lived in and worked on was on the waterfront in Point Richmond, California.

In 1926 she wrote an account of "The High Trip of 1925" in the Sierra Club Bulletin. In 1927 she traveled by automobile to Santa Fe and Taos, New Mexico, with Albert Bender and Ansel Adams.

In 1928, she married Lindsay Todd Damon (1871–1940), who was an English professor at Brown University from 1901 to 1936. They bought a house on 250 acres of land near Alton, New Hampshire and spent much of each year there, where she created extensive gardens. Soon she was president of her local garden club and then president of the New Hampshire Federation of Garden Clubs. After her book Grandma Called It Carnal became a best-seller, she was a popular guest lecturer to women's clubs and other groups. She generally returned to Berkeley for part of each year, and spent even more time there after the death of her husband in 1940. She died in nearby El Cerrito, California in 1975 at the age of 94.

== Books ==
- (as Bertha Clark Pope), editor (with George Sterling, uncredited): The Letters of Ambrose Bierce (Book Club of California, 1922; Gordian Press, 1967). Includes letters by Bierce, "The Introduction" by Pope, and "A Memoir of Ambrose Bierce" by Sterling.
- Grandma Called It Carnal (Simon and Schuster, 1938), review describes her experiences being raised in a Connecticut village by an eccentric grandmother who combined Victorian notions of propriety with a great admiration for Henry David Thoreau and an aversion to modern inventions.
- A Sense of Humus (Simon and Schuster, 1943), published in England as Green Corners (London: Michael Joseph, 1947), focuses on her adult life in the 1930s in rural New Hampshire, where she became an enthusiastic gardener and enjoyed getting to know some of the local characters. It includes much humor as well as serious passages. "Ruffled Paws," the chapter about cocker spaniels, has appeared in more than one anthology.
