= Mafatih al-Ulum =

- Author: Muhammad ibn Ahmad al-Khwarizmi
- Original title: مفاتيح العلوم
- Language: Arabic
- Subject: seminal encyclopedic
- Genre: Encyclopedic collection
- Published: 10th century
- Publication place: Samanid era

Mafatih al-Ulum (Arabic: مفاتيح العلوم, lit. Keys to the Sciences) is a seminal Arabic encyclopedic work composed by Muhammad ibn Ahmad al-Khwarizmi and dedicated to the Samanid vizier, Abu'l-Husain Utbi. It serves as a systematic classification of the sciences available during the late 10th century. The work is particularly noted for its division of knowledge into religious/Arabic sciences and non-Arabic/Greek-influenced sciences, providing a snapshot of the intellectual landscape of the Samanid era.

== Background ==
The author, al-Khwarizmi (often referred to as al-Katib or the scribe), remains a somewhat enigmatic figure due to the scarcity of biographical details in historical records. It is known that he was a contemporary of Abu'l-Husain Utbi, the vizier to the Samanid ruler Nuh II. Some historical sources, such as al-Maqrizi, have associated him with the epithet al-Balkhi. Based on his detailed knowledge of the sophisticated irrigation terminology of Merv, scholars suggest his origins may lie near the southern banks of the Oxus (Amu Darya) River.

Mafatih al-Ulum (The Keys of the Sciences), his most renowned work, was compiled during his tenure at the Samanid court. This early Islamic encyclopedia was designed as a crucial reference for court officials, a project initiated by Abū l-Ḥasan al-ʿUtbī, a vizier to Amir Nuh II. It was dedicated to Abu'l-Husain Utbi and is estimated to have been completed shortly after 366 AH (977 CE).

== Structure and Content ==
Al-Khwarizmi divides knowledge into two major sections: the first covers the religious and Arabic sciences, including jurisprudence, theology, grammar, secretarial writing, poetry and prosody, and historical reports; the second covers the non-Arab sciences, especially those associated with the Greeks and other peoples, such as philosophy, logic, medicine, arithmetic, geometry, astronomy, music, mechanics, and alchemy.

== Significance ==
As an early Islamic Encyclopedia of the Sciences, Mafātīḥ al-ʿulūm is part lexicography and part encyclopedia. Scholars regard it as the first attempt to document the Islamic sciences. The work includes sections on mathematics, alchemy, medicine and meteorology.

Beyond its encyclopedic scope, Mafatih al-Ulum is a vital resource for linguists and historians for several reasons. The text is a rich repository of technical terminology. It contains a vast array of Persian words—both in their original forms and as Arabicized loanwords—that were used to express scientific concepts. The work includes instances of Middle Persian (Pahlavi) vocabulary, making it useful for studying the transition of linguistic terms into the Islamic Golden Age. His specific use of terms related to the water management systems of Merv provides geographical and technological context to the era.

== Legacy ==
The work has been a subject of scholarly interest for centuries. In the early 20th century, it was notably examined by scholars such as Eilhard Wiedemann. It remains one of the primary sources for understanding how knowledge was categorized and transmitted in the Islamic world during the transition between the classical and medieval periods.
