= Ilse Lichtenstädter =

German-American Arab studies scholar

- Born: 10 September 1901; Hamburg, Germany
- Died: 23 May 1991 (aged 89); Boston, Massachusetts
- Education: University of Frankfurt; Oxford University
- Occupation: Academic

Ilse Lichtenstädter (10 September 1901 – 23 May 1991) was a Jewish German-American Orientalist who fled Nazi Germany. She studied Middle Eastern languages and philosophy, and also taught at Harvard University.

== Life and work ==
Ilse Lichtenstädter was born in Hamburg, Germany, on 10 September 1901. Her father was the scholar Jakob Lichtenstädter, a teacher at the Talmud Thora Realschule. She passed her Abitur in 1922 at a convent school and then became a teacher, while studying Semitic languages and philosophy at the University of Frankfurt in 1927. Shortly after completing her doctorate on Nasib in ancient Arabic poetry in 1931, her influential supervisor Josef Horovitz died. According to Johnston-Bloom, "Lichtenstadter often references Horovitz’s legacy in her own appeals for a renewed Judeo-Arabic symbiosis."

=== Leaving Germany ===
She was studying for her habilitation when the Nazis (National Socialists) came to power in Germany. In 1933, Lichtenstädter, a Jew, was forbidden by law from continuing her scholarship work in her home country, and so she moved to Great Britain, where she initially made a living by typing and proofreading (1933–1934) as a researcher at the Queen's College Library. At the same time, she attended Oxford University for three years, where she received another doctorate with David Samuel Margoliouth (1858-1940), resulting in an edition of the Kitäb al-muhabbar. From 1935 to 1938, she worked for the Oxford University Press.

In 1938, Lichtenstädter followed her two sisters and mother to live in New York and took a job as a cataloger of Judaica at the Jewish Theological Seminary in New York City.

At the beginning of 1940, after her emigration, Lichtenstädter was classified as an enemy of the German state by the Nazi dictatorship. Because she was mistakenly assumed to be in Great Britain, she was put on the special search list by the Reich Security Main Office. The people on that list were to be arrested in the event of a successful Nazi invasion and occupation of the British Isles. Lichtenstädter was to be located and arrested by the Wehrmacht with special priority from the SS special units.

=== Years in America ===
In 1942 in New York, Lichtenstädter worked as a professor of Arabic literature at Arthur Upham Pope’s American Institute for Persian Art and Archaeology, later the Asia Institute, in New York City. After the Institute's bankruptcy, she also taught for several years at Rutgers University and New York University before joining the faculty at Harvard University in Cambridge, Massachusetts. During this time, she traveled widely in the Middle East for research purposes.

From 1960 until her retirement in 1974, Lichtenstädter was a tenured lecturer of Middle Eastern languages and philosophy at Harvard University. Afterwards, she served as an emerita lecturer until her death. A collection of her papers is held at Harvard.

She died 23 May 1991 of pneumonia at Beth Israel Hospital in Boston at the age of 89.

== Selected works ==
- The Nasib of the ancient Arabic Qaside, in: Islamica 5 (1932), pp. 18–96.
- Women in the Aiyâm Al-ʻArab: A Study of Female Life During Warfare in Preislamic Arabia, 1935.
- From particularism to Unity: Race, Nationality and Minorities in the early Islamic Empire, in der "Islamic Culture", Jg. XXIII (1949), S. 251–280.
- A Note on the Gharaniq and Related Qur'anic Problems, in: Israel Oriental Studies, Jg. 5 (1975), S. 54–61.
- And Become Ye Accursed Apes, in: Jerusalem Studies in Arabic and Islam, Jg. 14 (1991), S. 153–175.
