= Utbi family =

Elite Persian family

The Utbi family (also spelled Otbi), was a Persian family which served the Samanid Empire. The first mentioned member of the family was Abu Ja'far Utbi, who served as the vizier of Nuh I (r. 943–954) and Mansur I (r. 961–976). Another member of the family was Abu'l-Husain Utbi, who served as the vizier of Nuh II (r. 976–997).

== Sources ==
- Ashraf, Ahmad (2006). "Iranian identity iii. Medieval Islamic period". In Yarshater, Ehsan (ed.). Encyclopædia Iranica. Vol. XIII/5: Iran X. Religions in Iran–Iraq V. Safavid period. London and New York: Routledge & Kegan Paul. pp. 507–522. ISBN 978-0-933273-93-1.
- Bosworth, C. E. (2010). "'Otbi". In Yarshater, Ehsan (ed.). Encyclopædia Iranica (Online ed.). Encyclopædia Iranica Foundation.
- Frye, R.N. (1975). "The Sāmānids". In Frye, Richard N. (ed.). The Cambridge History of Iran. Vol. 4. Cambridge: Cambridge University Press. pp. 136–161. ISBN 0-521-20093-8.
