= Asia Institute (disambiguation) =

Asia Institute is defunct organization active between 1966 and 1979 in Shiraz, Iran.

Asia Institute may also refer to:

== Organizations ==
- Asia Institute (UCLA), research center at the University of California, Los Angeles
- Asia Institute (Melbourne), Asian languages and culture institute at the University of Melbourne
- Asia Institute (UVA), multidisciplinary center at the University of Virginia
- The Asia Institute, public policy think tank founded in 2007, active in Seoul, Republic of Korea
