= Asia Institute =

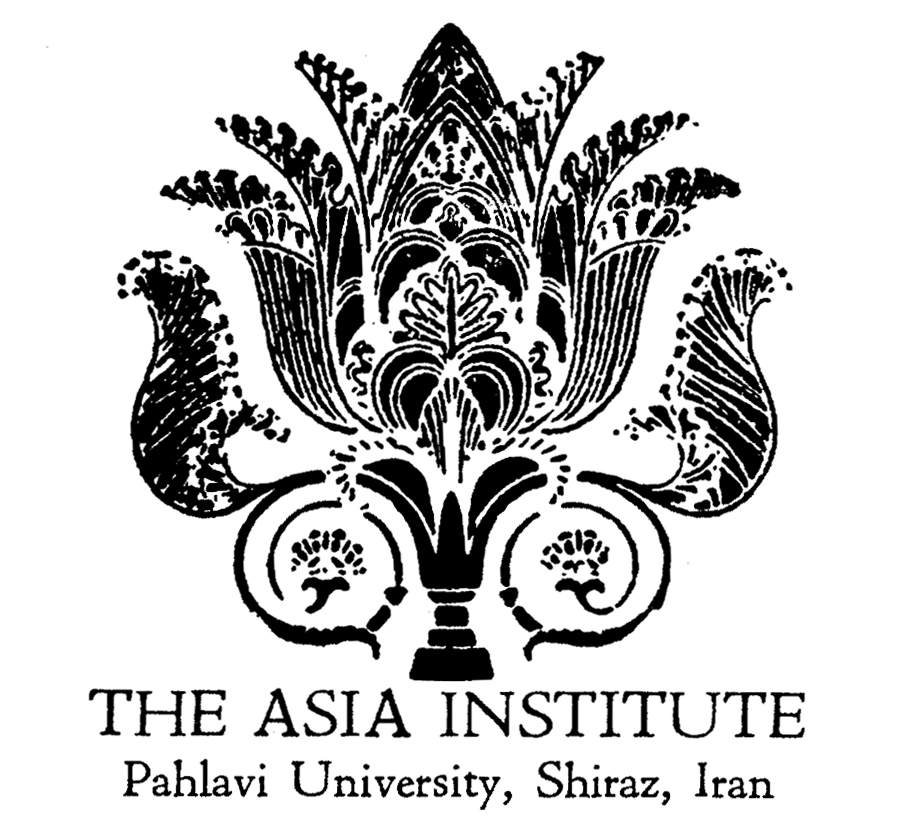
- Formation: 1928
- Founder: Arthur Upham Pope, Phyllis Ackerman
- Dissolved: 1979
- Headquarters: Shiraz, Iran
- Formerly called: American Institute for Persian Art and Archaeology

The Asia Institute (1928–1979) was an American organization in support of research and interest in Persian art and archaeology; and starting in 1964 it was funded by the Pahlavi-era Iran. Two remnants from the Asia Institute are the Bulletin of the Asia Institute, published in the United States, and the Qavam House museum (or Narenjestan) at Shiraz University, Iran.

== History ==
The Asia Foundation was founded in 1928 in New York City, as the American Institute for Persian Art and Archaeology. Later, it continued its activity in Shiraz, Iran between 1966 and 1979. Its affiliations, functions, and publications have varied over the years, although it no longer exists as an organization.

The Asia Institute was founded by Arthur Upham Pope and Phyllis Ackerman, who had organized in 1926 an exhibition and the First International Congress on Persian Art in Philadelphia. The Asia Institute's first director was Pope, and Ackerman served as an assistant and co-director. One of its professors was Arab studies scholar Ilse Lichtenstädter who taught there until the Institute closed. The aim of the institute was to promote research and interest in Persian art and archaeology through exhibitions, lectures, congresses and publications, and to assist in the excavation and conservation of monuments in Persia.

Due to close contacts with the royal family of Iran, Pope and his wife moved to Shiraz in 1966, where the Asia Institute was re-established as a part of Pahlavi University (now Shiraz University) and housed in the late-nineteenth-century Qajari mansion called the Qavam House (or Narenjestan). The institute organized the 5th International Congress of Iranian Art and Archaeology, which took place in Tehran in 1968.

The Asia Institute in Shiraz was closed after the Islamic revolution in 1979, but the Qavam House re-opened as a museum. Eventually, the Bulletin of the Asia Institute was revived in Michigan in 1987. As of 2026, the journal continues to be published by the Yarshater Center for the Study of Iranian Literary Traditions at the University of California, Los Angeles, under the editorship of M. Rahim Shayegan.

Asia Institute

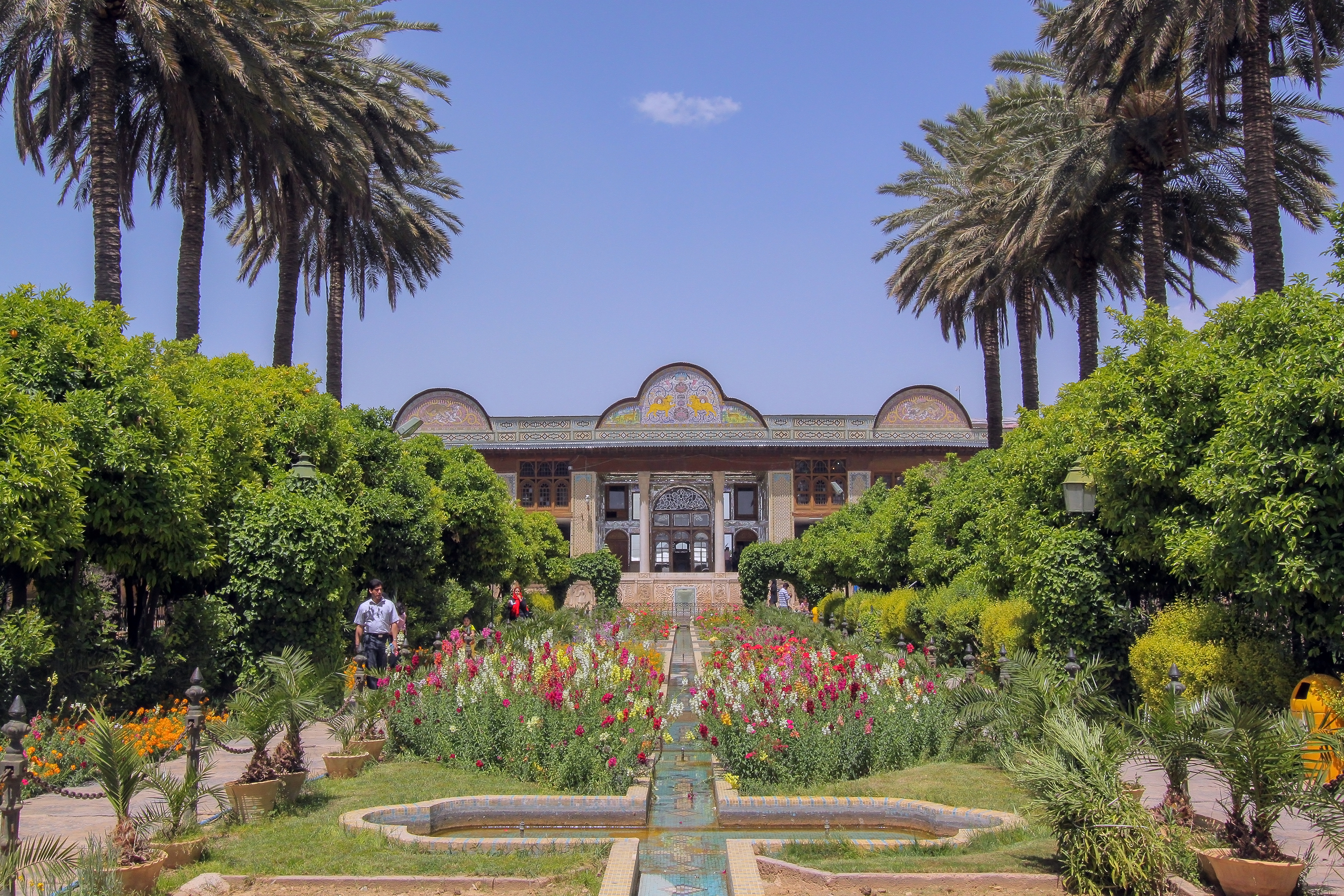
Garden and building of Qavam House (Narenjestan-e Ghavam)

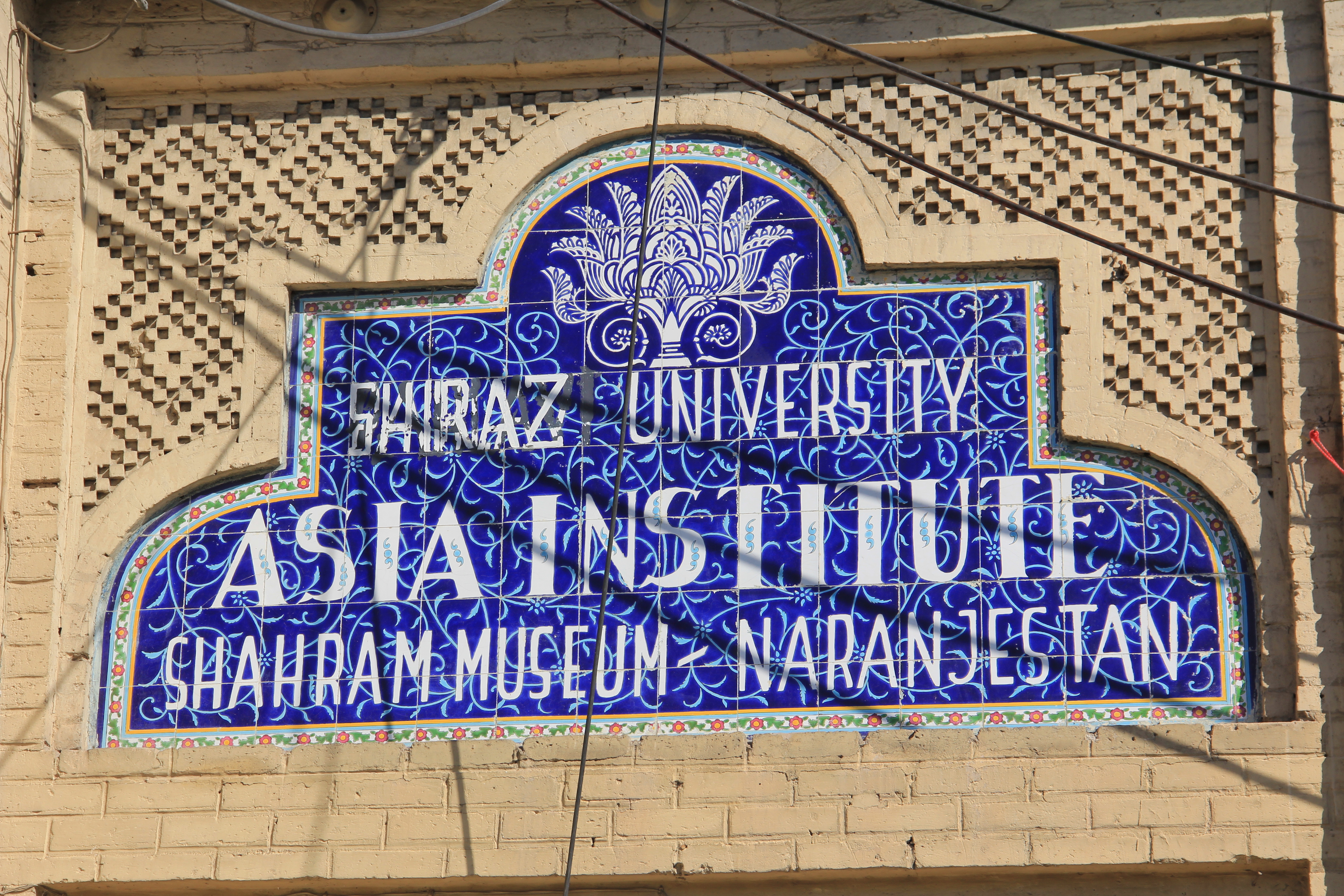
Sign
