= Morale =

Capacity of a group's members to maintain belief in an institution or goal

Morale (/məˈræl/ mə-RAL, UK also /-ˈrɑːl/ -RAHL) is the capacity of a group's members to maintain belief in an institution or goal, particularly in the face of opposition or hardship. Morale is often referenced by authority figures as a generic value judgment of the willpower, obedience, and self-discipline of a group tasked with performing duties assigned by a superior. According to Alexander H. Leighton, "morale is the capacity of a group of people to pull together persistently and consistently in pursuit of a common purpose". With good morale, a force will be less likely to give up or surrender. Deliberately attempting to reduce another group's morale is called demoralization. Morale is usually assessed at a collective, rather than an individual level. In wartime, civilian morale is also important.

== Definition ==
Military history experts have not agreed on a precise definition of "morale". Clausewitz's comments on the subject have been described as "deliberately vague" by modern scholars. George Francis Robert Henderson, a widely read military author of the pre-World War I era, viewed morale as related to the instinct of self-preservation, the suppression of which he said was "the moral fear of turning back", in other words, that a willingness to fight was bolstered by a strong sense of duty. Henderson wrote:

Human nature must be the basis of every leader's calculations. To sustain the moral[e] of his own men; to break down the moral[e] of his enemy—these are the great objects which, if he be ambitious of success, he must always keep in view.

During the proceedings of the Southborough Committee inquiry concerning shellshock, testimony by Colonel J. F. C. Fuller defined morale as "the acquired quality which in highly-trained troops counterbalances the influence of the instinct of self-preservation." Of Henderson's "moral fear", the soldier's sense of duty, it is contrasted with the fear of death, and to control one's troops required of a commander more than authoritarian force, but other strategies to be deployed to that purpose.

== Military ==
An American general defined morale as "when a soldier thinks his army is the best in the world, his regiment the best in the army, his company the best in the regiment, his squad the best in the company, and that he himself is the best blankety-blank soldier man in the outfit."

— H. R. Knickerbocker, 1941

In military science, there are two meanings to morale: individual perseverance and unit cohesion. Morale is often highly dependent on soldier effectiveness, health, comfort, safety, and belief-in-purpose, and therefore an army with good supply lines, sound air cover, and a clear objective will typically possess, as a whole, better morale than one without. "Will to fight" is the single most important factor in war. Will to fight helps determine whether a military unit stays in the fight and also how well it fights.

Historically, elite military units such as special operations forces have "high morale" due to their training and pride in their unit. When a unit's morale is said to be "depleted", it means it is close to "crack and surrender". Most commanders do not look at the morale of specific individuals but rather the "fighting spirit" of squadrons, divisions, battalions, ships, etc.

Clausewitz stresses the importance of morale and will for both the soldier and the commander. The soldier's first requirement is moral and physical courage, both the acceptance of responsibility and the suppression of fear. In order to survive the horror of combat[,] he must have an invincible martial spirit, which can be attained only through military victory and hardship. The soldier has but one purpose: "The end for which a soldier is recruited, clothed, armed and trained, the whole object of his sleeping, eating, drinking, and marching is simply that he should fight at the right place and the right time.

Military morale is in a large sense inseparable from civilian morale because each reacts upon the other and both are in large measure based on fidelity to a cause. But there is a certain kind of morale that is distinctly military. It begins with the soldier's attitude toward duty. It develops with the soldier's command over himself. It is a spirit that becomes dominant in the individual and also in the group. Whether the soldier has physical comforts or suffers physical hardships may be a factor but is seldom the determining factor in making or unmaking his morale. A cause known and believed in; knowledge that substantial justice governs discipline; the individual's confidence and pride in himself, his comrades, his leaders; the unit's pride in its own will; these basic things, supplemented by intelligent welfare and recreation measures and brought to life by a spirit of mutual respect and co-operation, combine to weld a seasoned fighting force capable of defending the nation.

In August 2012, an article entitled "Army morale declines in survey" states that "only a quarter of the [US] Army's officers and enlisted soldiers believe the nation's largest military branch is headed in the right direction." The "... most common reasons cited for the bleak outlook were "ineffective leaders at senior levels," a fear of losing the best and the brightest after a decade of war, and the perception, especially among senior enlisted soldiers, that "the Army is too soft" and lacks sufficient discipline."

== Employee morale ==
Employee morale is proven to have a direct effect on productivity; it is one of the cornerstones of business.

== See also ==
- Military psychology
- Collective identity
- Committee for National Morale
- Demoralization (warfare)
- Information warfare
- Motivation
- Pre-work assembly
- Psychological warfare
- Rank theory of depression
