= Khaju Bridge =

Historic bridge in Isfahan, Iran

Khwaju Bridge پل خواجو
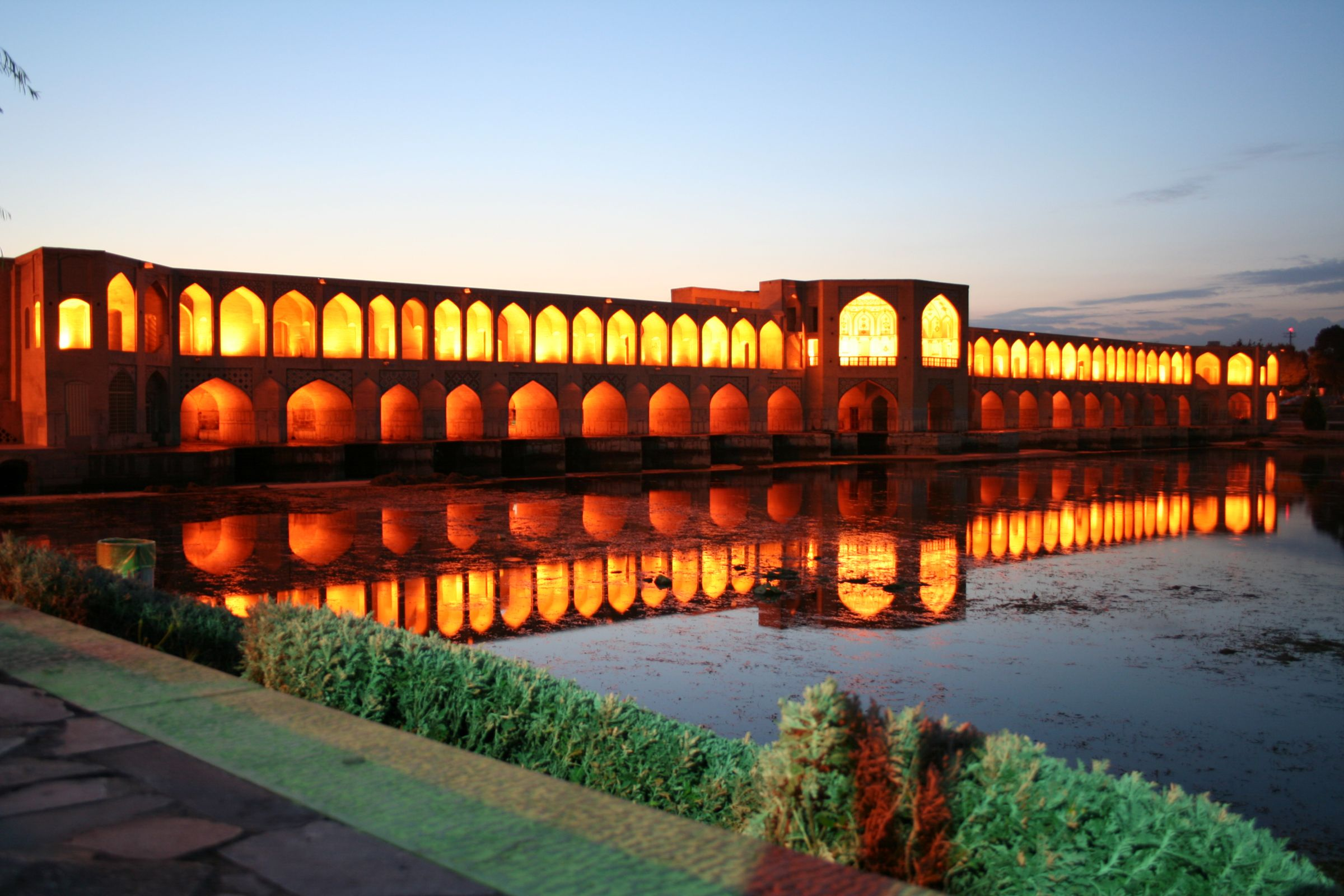
- Coordinates: 32°38′12″N 51°41′00″E
- Crosses: Zayanderud
- Locale: Isfahan, Iran

Characteristics
- Design: Arch bridge
- Material: Stone and brick
- Total length: 137 m (449 ft)
- Width: 12 m (39 ft)
- No. of spans: 21

History
- Construction end: 1650

Location
- Interactive map of Khwaju Bridge پل خواجو

Khaju Bridge
- Interactive map of Khaju Bridge

Iran National Heritage List
- Official name: Khwaju Bridge
- Type: Bridge
- Designated: 1932
- Reference no.: 111
- Conservation organization: Cultural Heritage, Handicrafts and Tourism Organization of Iran

The Khaju Bridge (Persian: پل خواجو, romanized: Pol-e Xāju) is a historic bridge on the Zayanderud, the largest river of the Iranian plateau, in Isfahan, Iran. Serving as both a bridge and a weir, it links the Khaju quarter on the north bank with the Zoroastrian quarter across the Zayanderud. It is located at the end of Kamal Ismail Street in Isfahan.

The bridge served a primary function as a building and a place for public meetings in the past. It has been described as the city's finest bridge.

Persian art historians and revivalists, Arthur Upham Pope and Phyllis Ackerman are interred in a mausoleum nearby.

== History ==
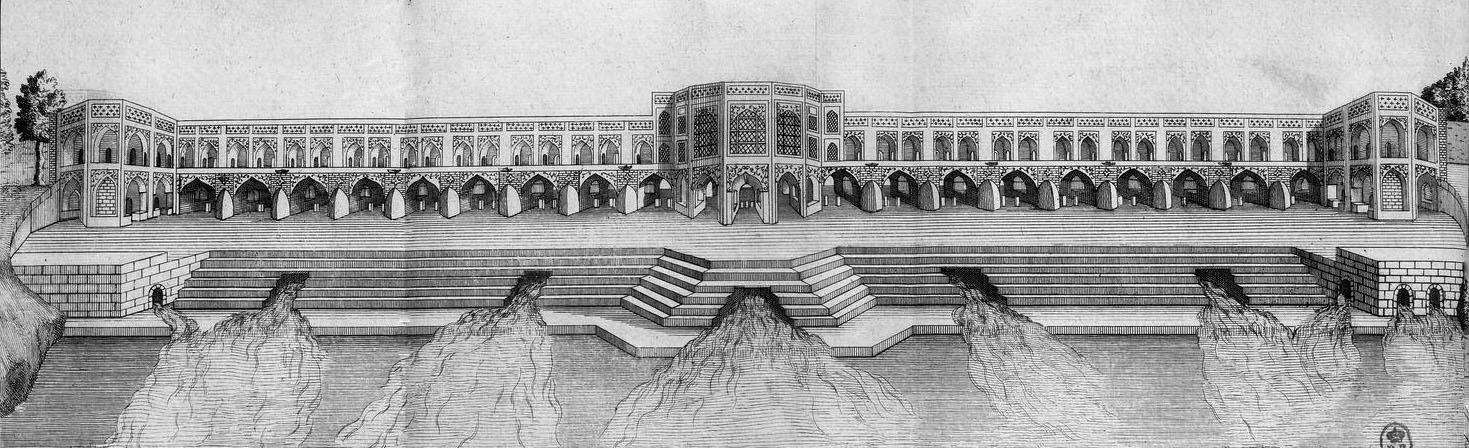
Drawing of the Khaju Bridge by Jean Chardin, 1670s

The Khaju Bridge was built around 1650, during the reign of Abbas II, the seventh shah of Safavid Iran, on the foundations of an older bridge. The existing inscriptions suggest that the bridge was repaired in 1873. There is a pavilion located in the center of the structure, inside which Abbas II would have once sat, admiring the view. Today, remnants of a stone seat is all that is left of the shah's chair.

In words of Arthur Pope and Jean Chardin, Khaju is "the culminating monument of Persian bridge architecture and one of the most interesting bridges extant ... where the whole has rhythm and dignity and combines in the happiest consistency, utility, beauty, and recreation." The poets of Isfahan wrote beautiful poems on the Khajoo bridge and in these poems they praised its beauties. Among these poems is the long poem by Saeb Tabrizi which describes one of the days of celebration and illumination next to this bridge.

According to historians and scholars who have studied the Safavid dynasty, Shah Abbas II's goal in building the Khajoo Bridge was to connect the two districts of Khajoo and the Hassanabad Gate with Takht-e Folad and Shiraz Road. Tourists who came to Isfahan at different times praised the beauty of the Khajoo Bridge and considered it one of the eternal masterpieces of Iranian and Islamic architecture.

== Structure ==
The bridge has 23 arches and is 133 meters long and 12 meters wide. Iranian architects have raised concerns about damage inflicted on the bridge during recent "improvement program" renovations, citing, among other problems, the destruction of the original stepped base of the bridge, the alterations made to the riverbed, and the removal of the Safavid inscribed stone blocks from the bridge.

== Gallery ==
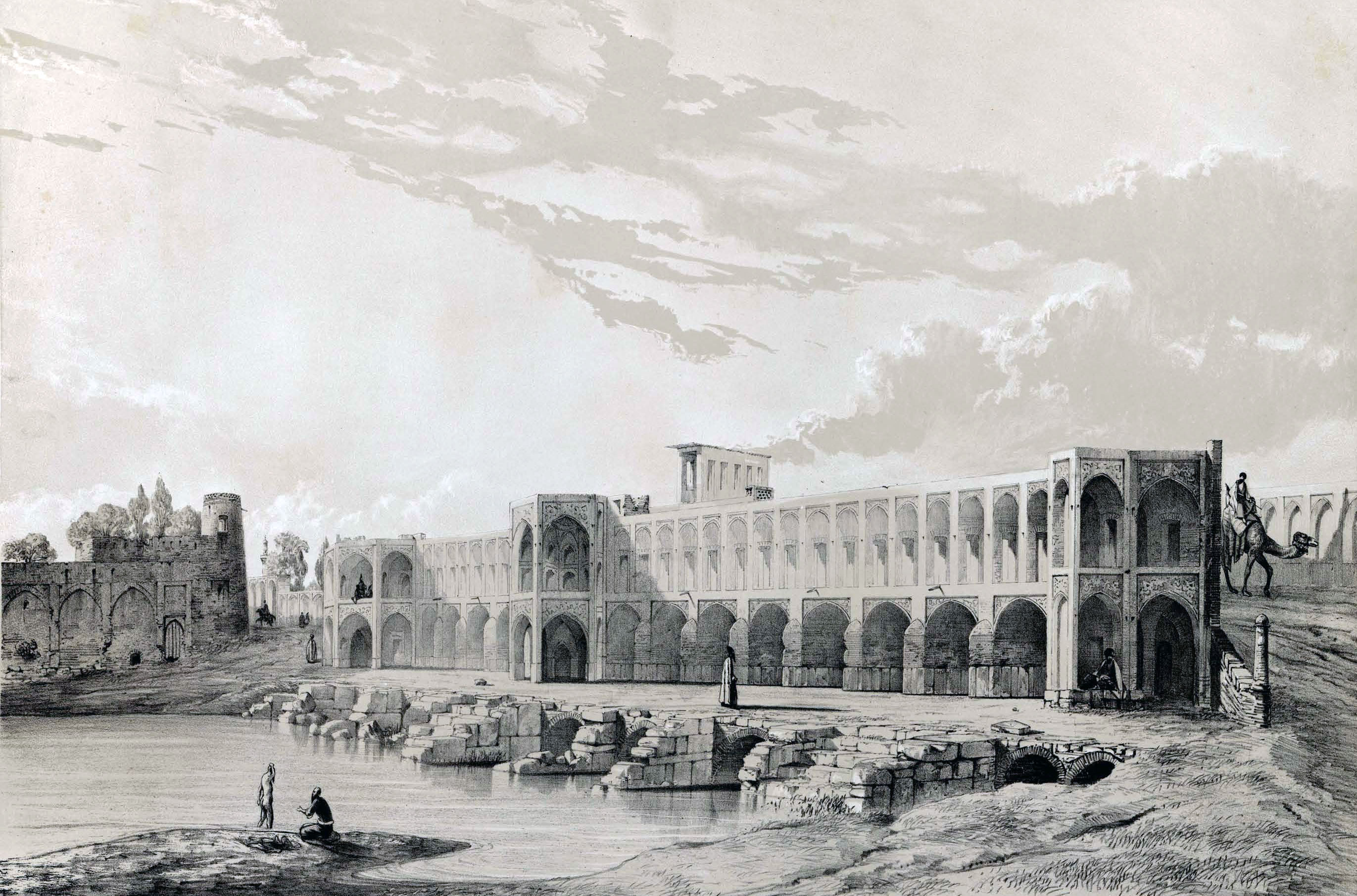
The Khaju Bridge as depicted by Eugène Flandin in 1840

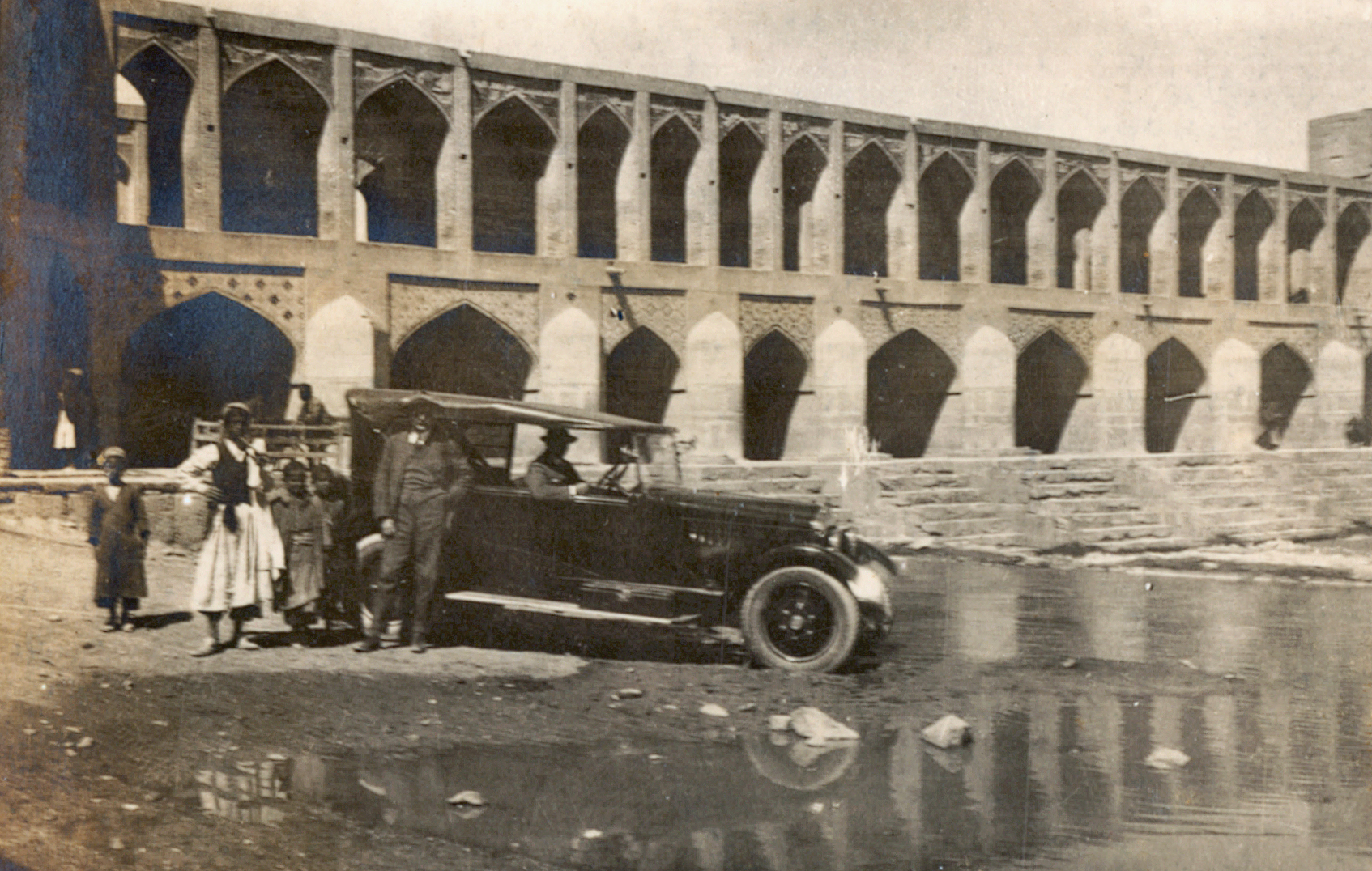
The Khaju Bridge in the 1930s

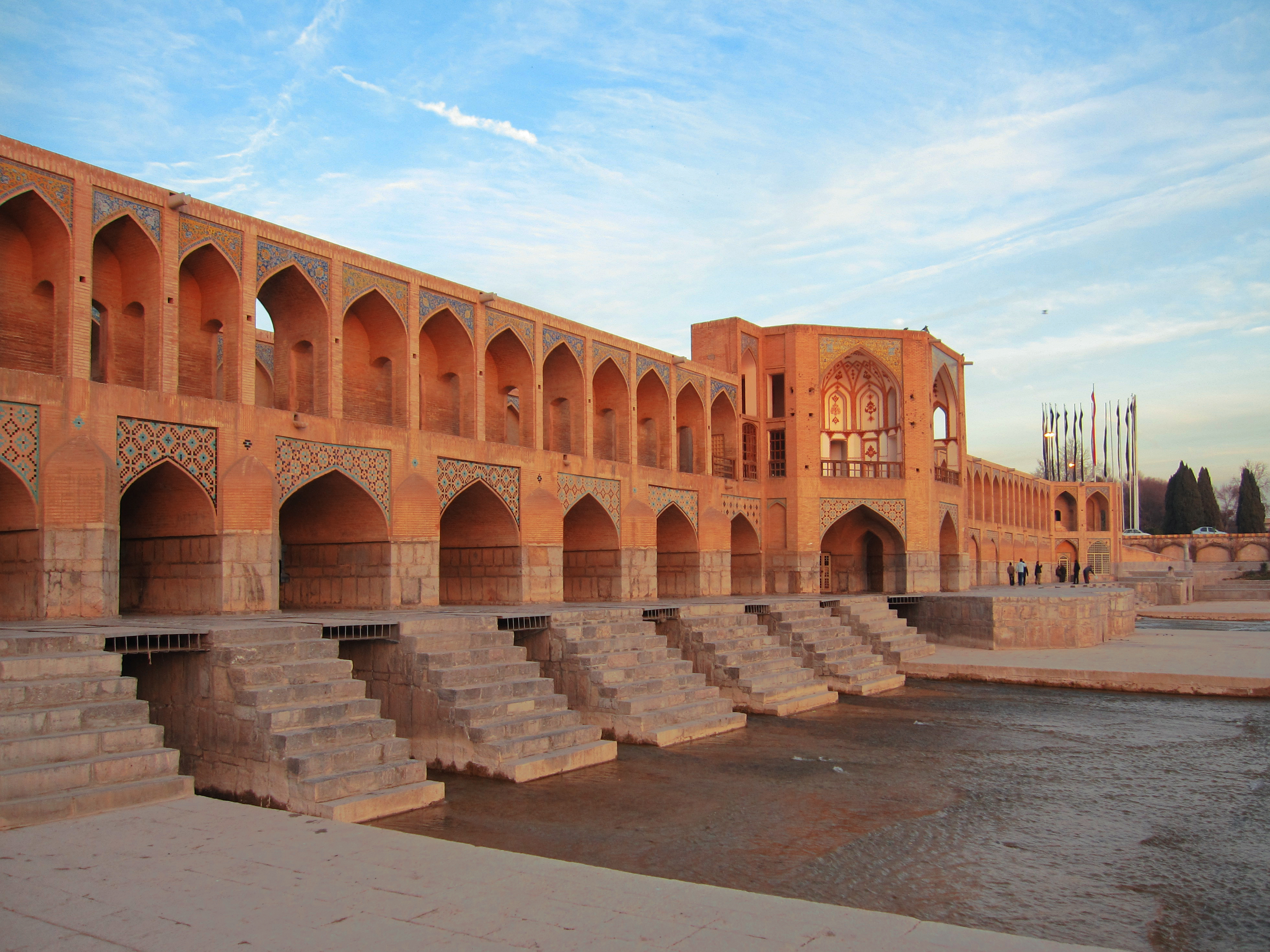
A view of the Khaju Bridge in January 2010

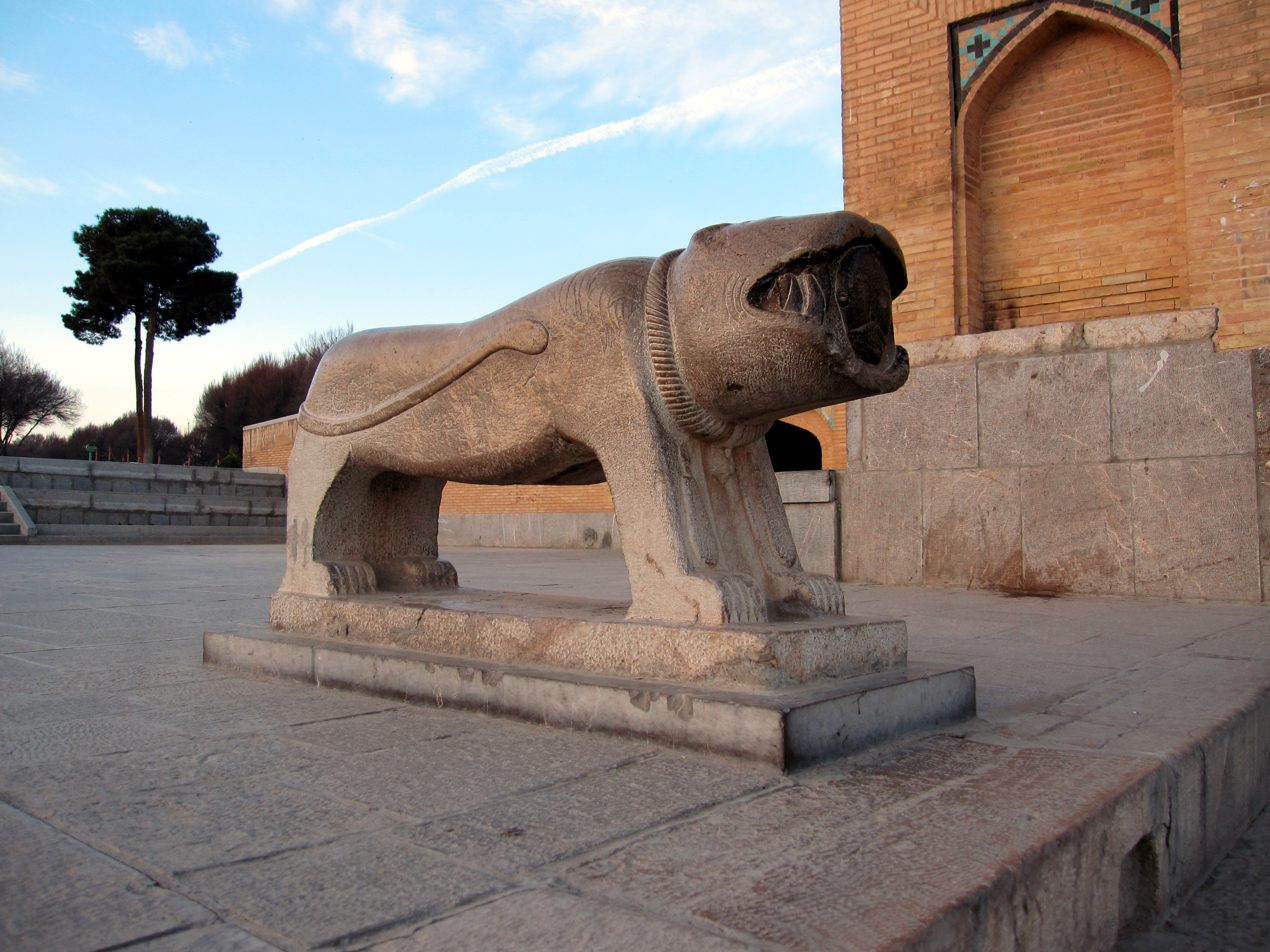
One of the two stone lions of the Khaju Bridge

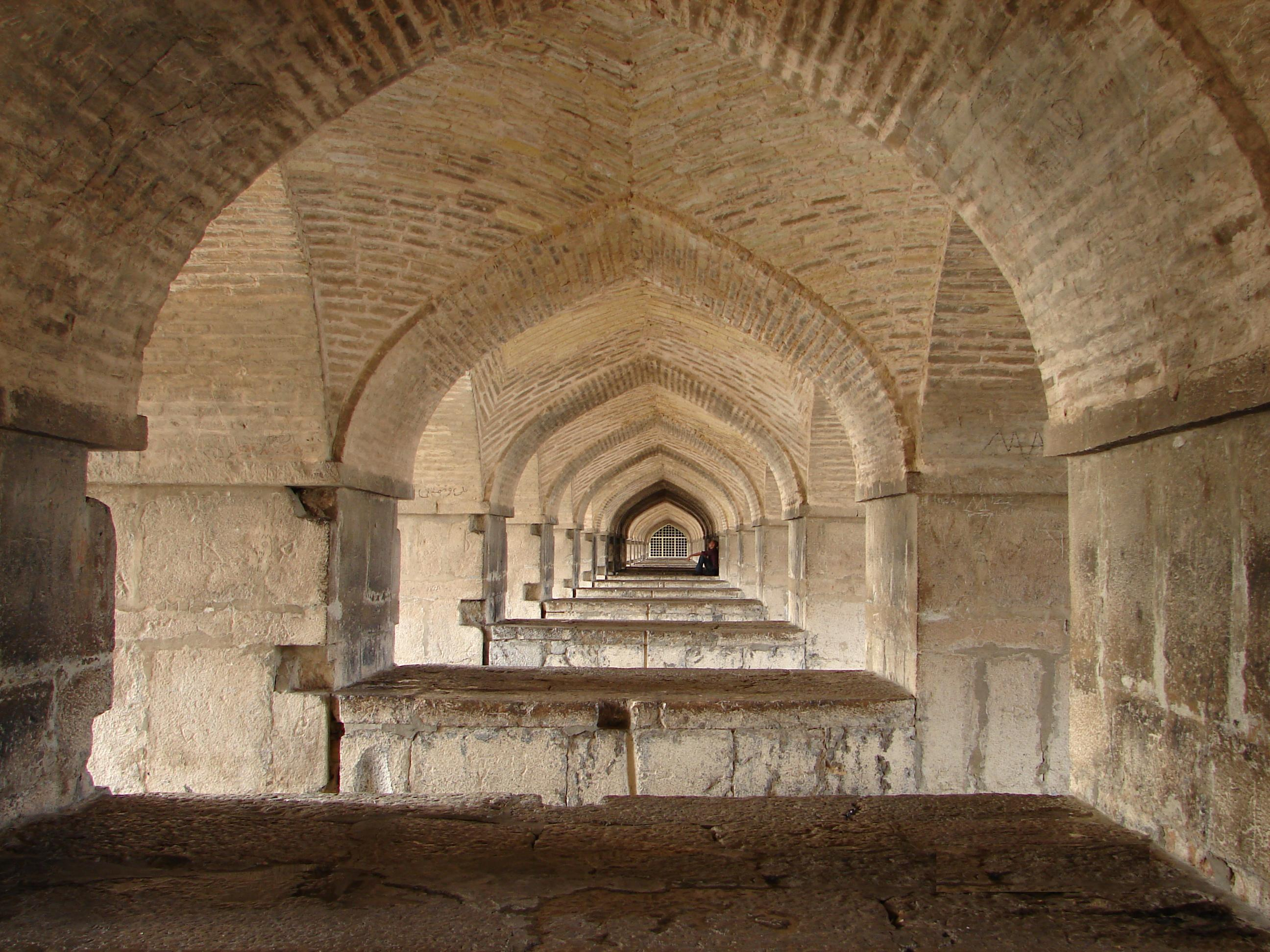
Arches under the Khaju Bridge

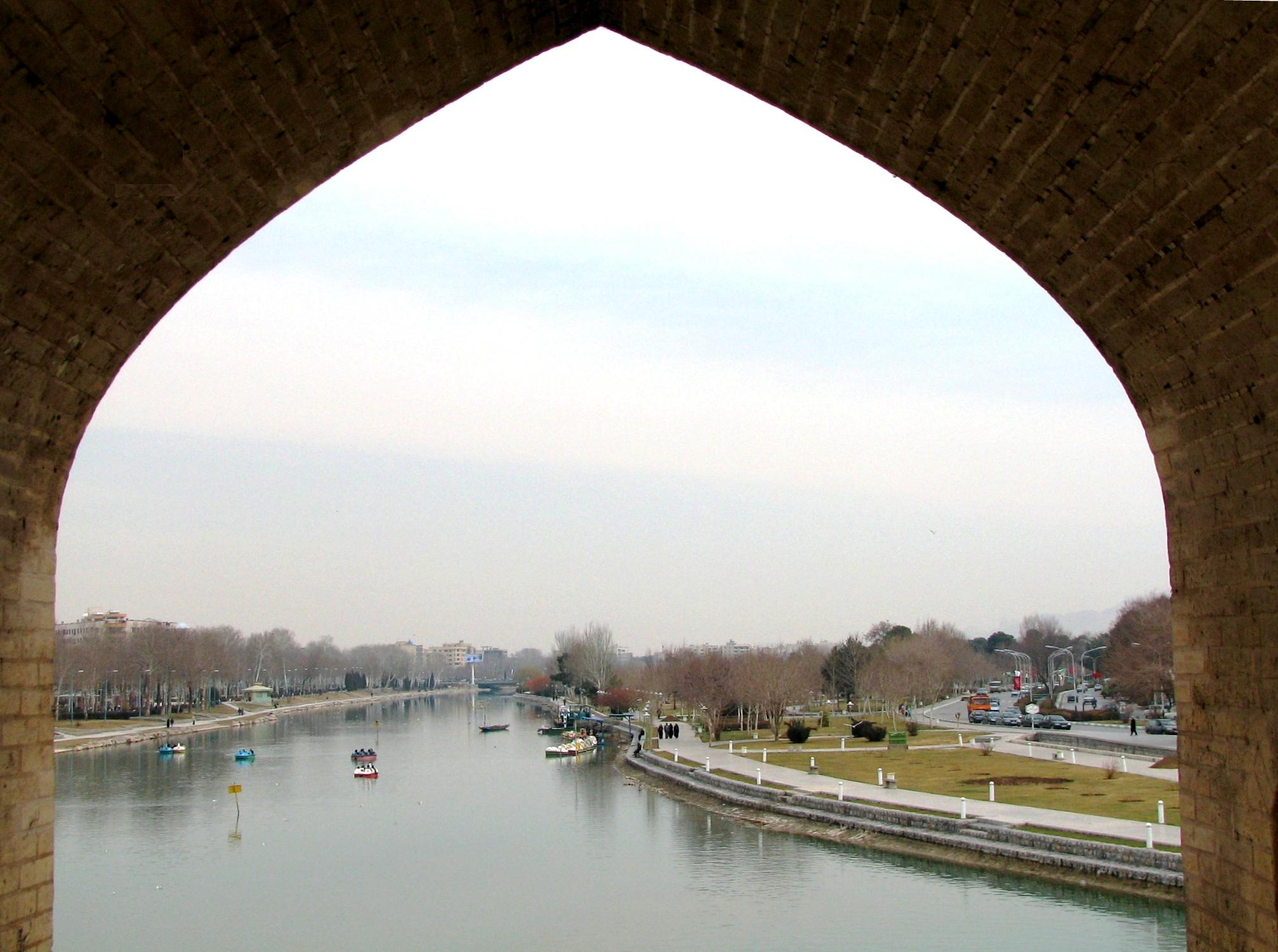
A view seen from within the Khaju Bridge

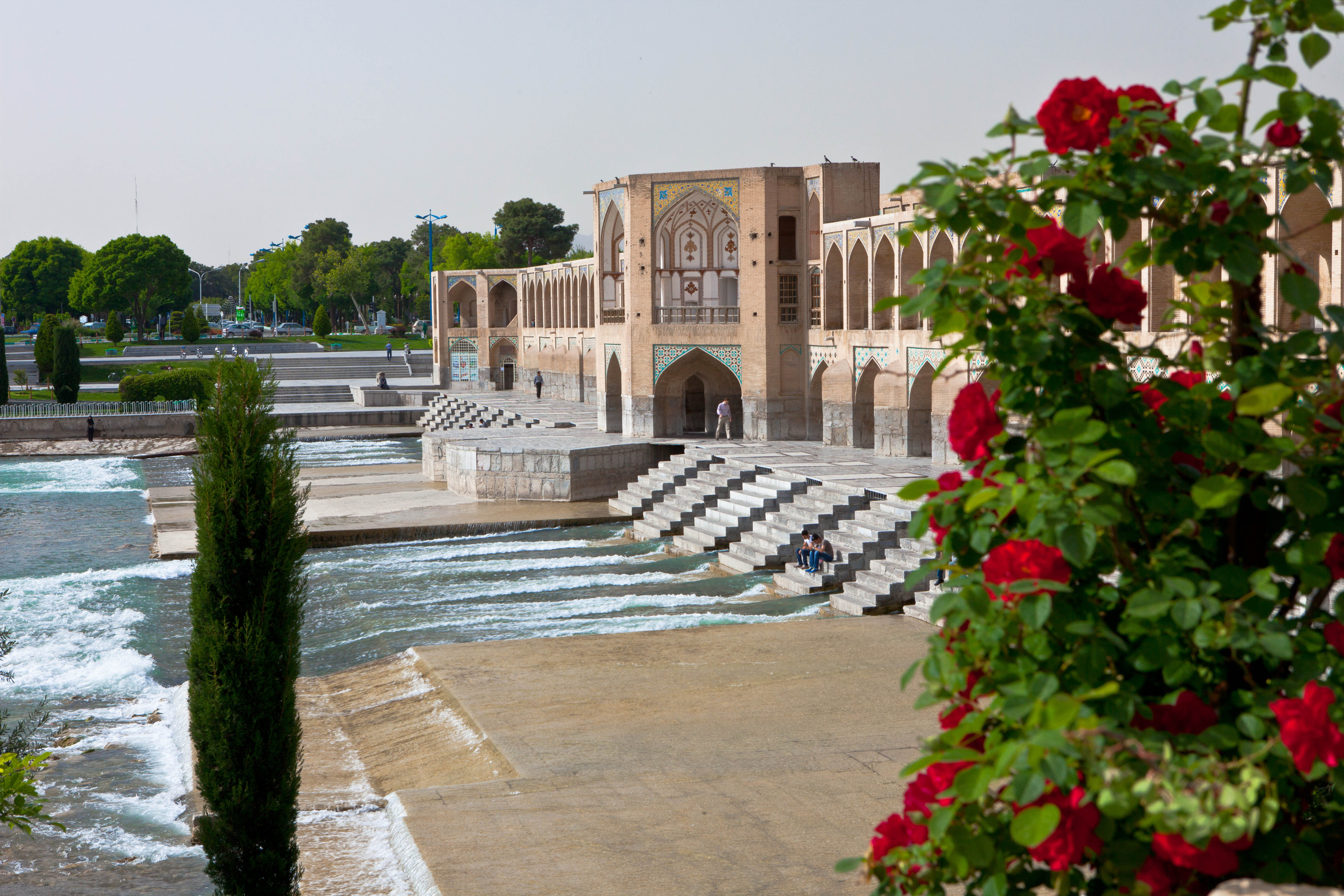
A view of the Khaju Bridge in April 2012

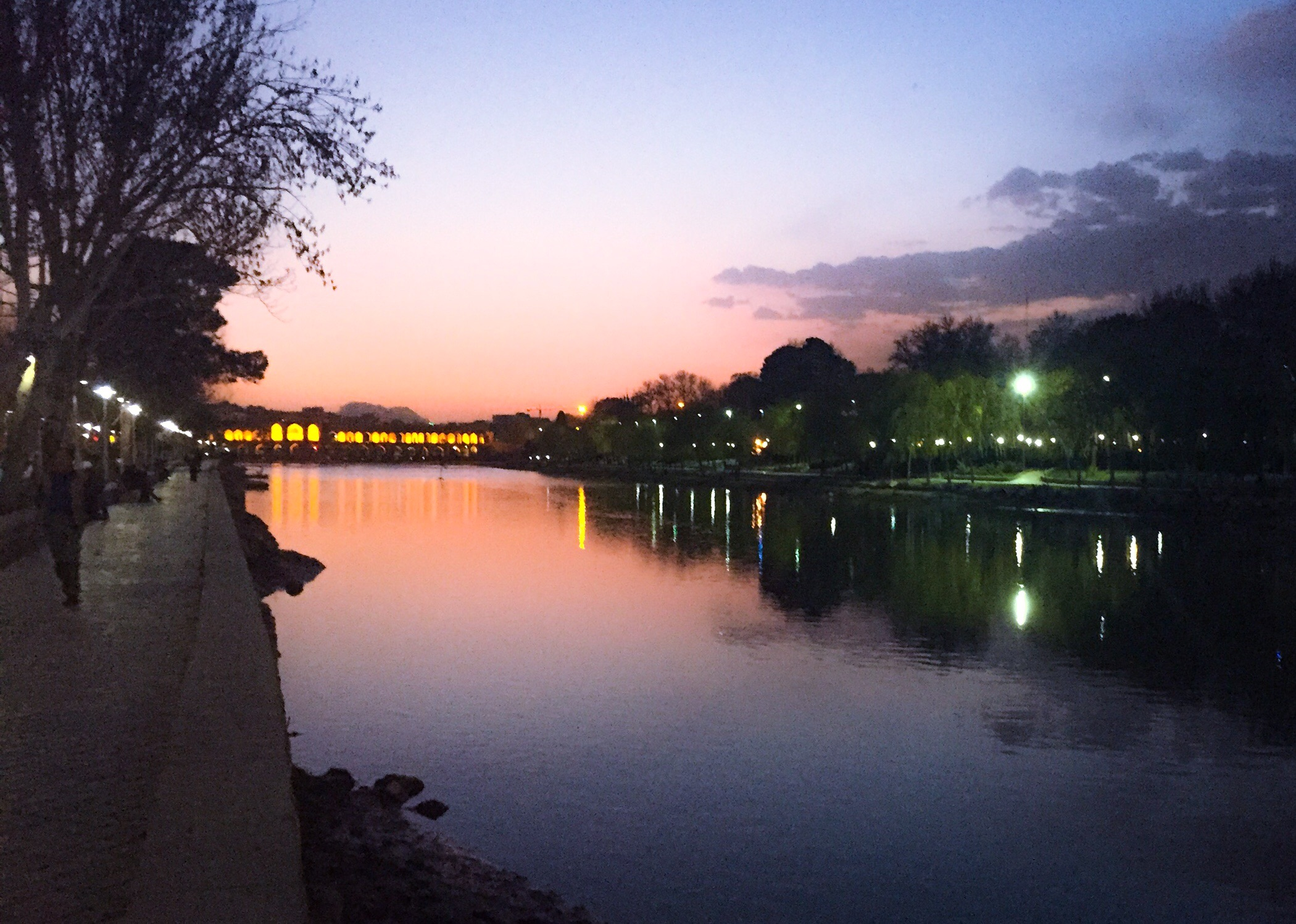
A view of the bridge and the Zayanderud at sunset

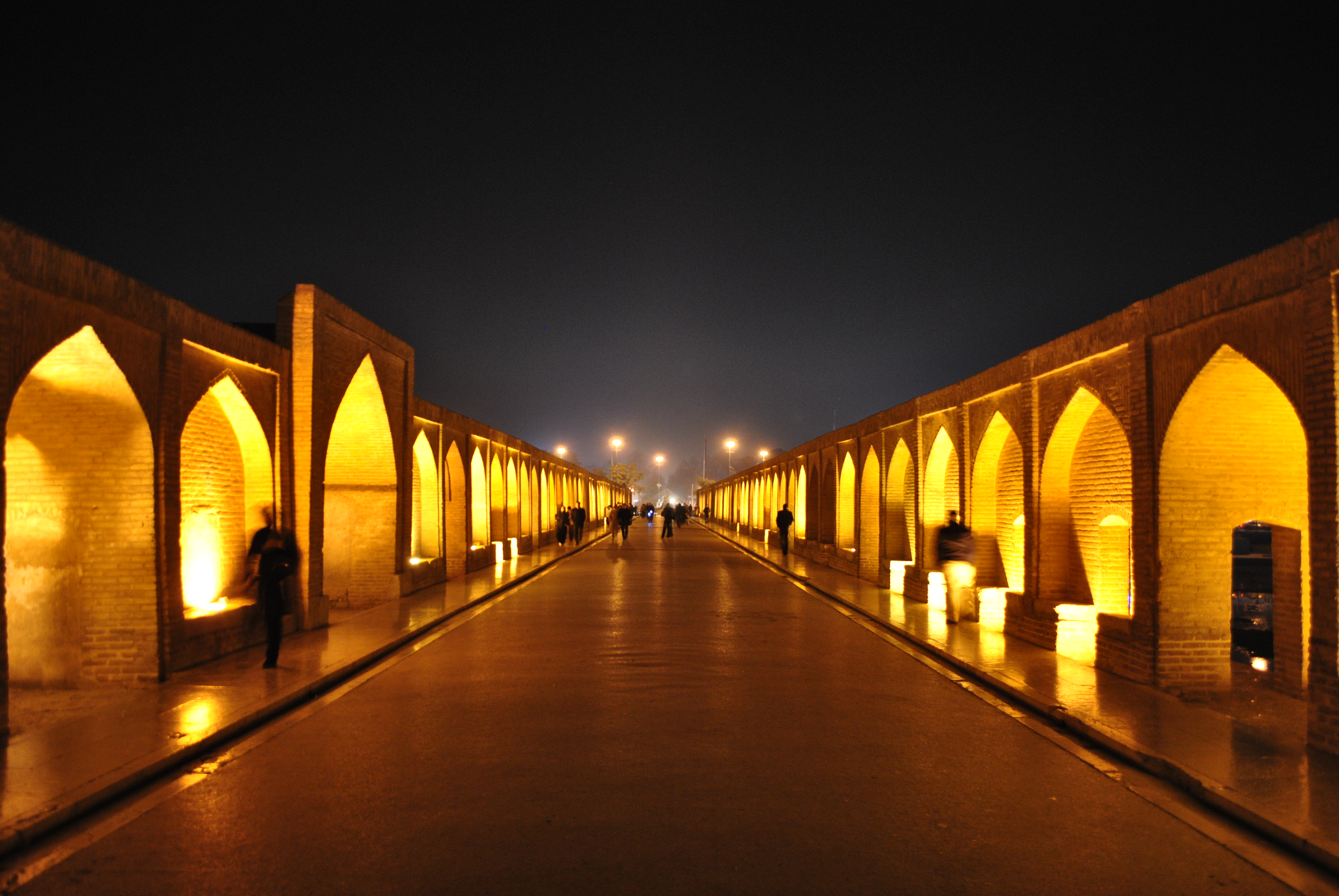
A view of the walkway on the Khaju Bridge at night

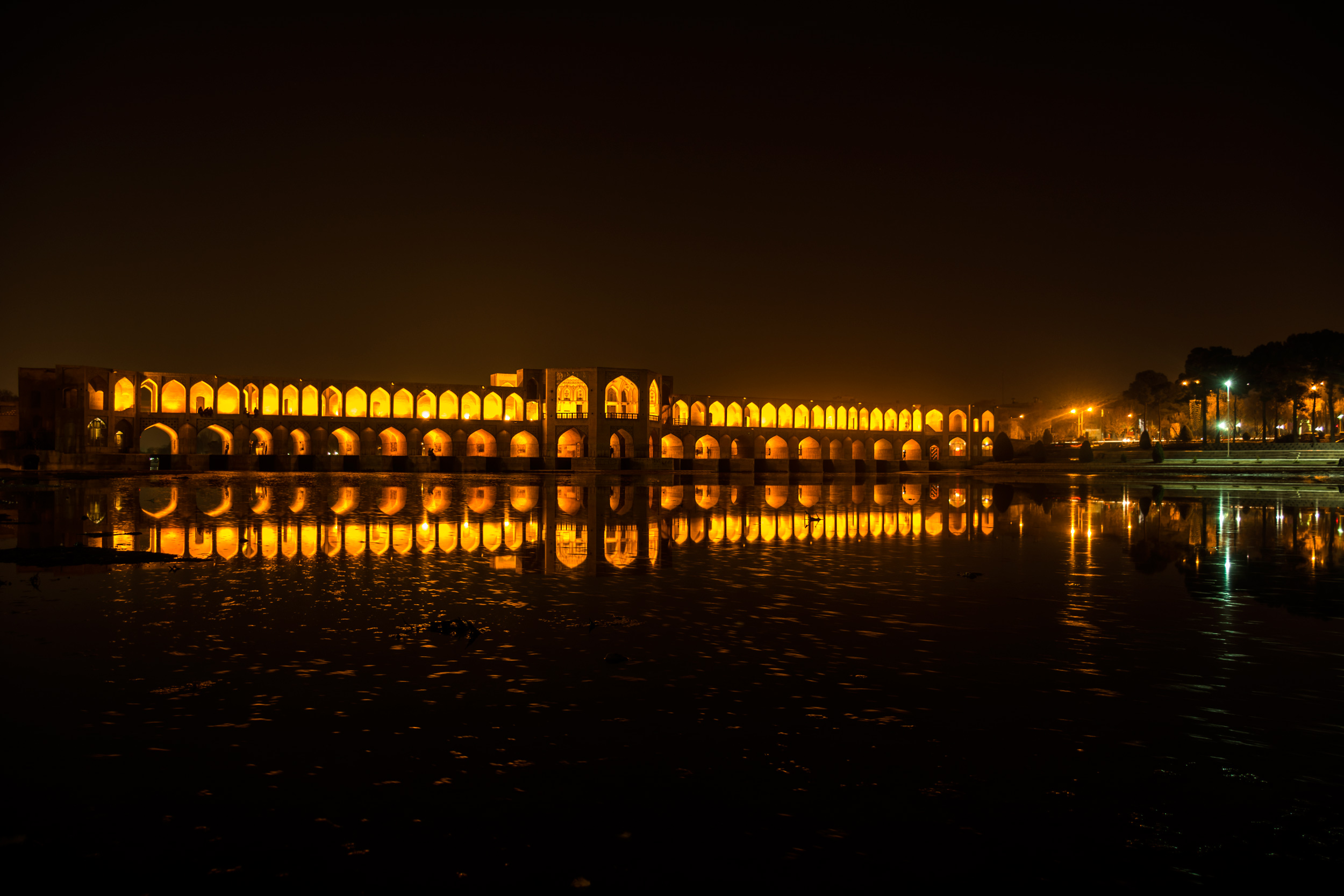
A wide view of the Khaju Bridge at night

== See also ==
- Si-o-se-pol, another such bridge on the same river
- Putra Bridge, a bridge in Malaysia that was inspired by Khaju
