= Stella Benson =

British writer (1892–1933)

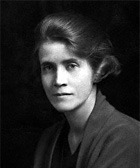
- Born: 6 January 1892; Easthope, Shropshire, England
- Died: 7 December 1933 (aged 41); Hạ Long, Tonkin, Vietnam
- Occupations: Poet, travel writer
- Awards: Benson Medal

Stella Benson (6 January 1892 – 7 December 1933) was an English feminist, novelist, poet, and travel writer. She was a recipient of the (A.C.) Benson Medal.

== Early life ==
Benson was born to Ralph Beaumont Benson (1862–1911), a member of the landed gentry, and Caroline Essex Cholmondeley in Easthope, Shropshire in 1892. Stella's aunt, Mary Cholmondeley, was a well-known novelist. Stella was often ill during her childhood and throughout her life. By her sixth birthday, she and her family, based in London, had moved frequently. She spent some of her childhood in schools in Germany and Switzerland. She began writing a diary at the age of 10 and kept it up for all of her life. By the time she was writing poetry her parents had separated; she later saw her father only infrequently. When she did see him, he encouraged her to quit writing poetry for the time being, until she was older and more experienced. Instead, Stella increased her writing output, adding novel writing to her repertoire. When her father died, Stella learned that he had been an alcoholic.

== Writing ==
Benson spent the winter of 1913–14 in the West Indies, which provided material for her first novel, I Pose (1915). Living in London, she became involved in women's suffrage, as had her older female relatives. During World War I, she supported the troops by gardening and by helping poor women in London's East End at the Charity Organisation Society. These efforts inspired Benson to write the novels This Is the End (1917) and Living Alone (1919). Living Alone is a fantasy novel about a woman whose life is transformed by a witch. She also published her first volume of poetry, Twenty, in 1918.

Benson then decided that she wanted to see the world, leaving England for the United States in June 1918. After stops in New York, Pennsylvania, New Hampshire, and Chicago, where along the way she met various American writers including Bertha Pope and Harriet Monroe, she went to stay with Bertha Pope in Berkeley. In Berkeley and San Francisco from December 1918 through December 1919, she participated in a bohemian community that included Albert Bender, Anne Bremer, Witter Bynner, Sara Bard Field, Charles Erskine Scott Wood, and Marie de Laveaga Welch. She took on a job at the University of California as a tutor, then as an editorial reader for the university press. Her California experiences inspired her next novel, The Poor Man (1922).

In 1920, she went to China, where she worked in a mission school and hospital, and met the man who would be her husband, James (Shaemas) O'Gorman Anderson, an Anglo-Irish officer in the Chinese Maritime Customs Service (CMCS) and later father of Benedict Anderson and Perry Anderson. They married in London the following year. This was a complex relationship, but a very firm one. Benson followed Anderson through various Customs postings including Nanning, Beihai, and Hong Kong, even though her writings on China sometimes put her at odds with the HM Revenue and Customs leadership.

They had strong shared intellectual interests. Their honeymoon was spent crossing America in a Ford, and Benson wrote about this in The Little World (1925).

=== Later works ===
Benson's writing continued, although none of her works are well known today. Pipers and a Dancer (1924) and Goodbye, Stranger (1926) were followed by another book of travel essays, Worlds Within Worlds, and the story The Man Who Missed the 'Bus in 1928. Her most famous work, the novel The Far-Away Bride, was published in the United States first in 1930 and as Tobit Transplanted in Britain in 1931. It won the Femina Vie Heureuse Prize for English writers in 1932. This was followed by two limited-edition collections of short stories, Hope Against Hope (1931) of which 670 were printed and signed, and Christmas Formula (1932). In 1931 she was awarded the Benson Medal (founded in 1916 by A.C. Benson) in recognition of her lifelong contributions to literature.

Benson was a friend of Winifred Holtby and, through her, of Vera Brittain. The effects of the news of Benson's death on both women are recalled in Brittain's second volume of autobiography, the first volume of which is the better known Testament of Youth (1933). Virginia Woolf also knew Benson, and remarked in her diary after her death: 'A curious feeling: when a writer like Stella Benson dies, that one’s response is diminished; Here and Now won’t be lit up by her: its life lessened.' She was also a friend of Naomi Mitchison, who devoted to Benson a chapter in her own autobiography You May Well Ask, with extensive quotations from her correspondence with Benson in the 1920s and early 1930s.

Benson's last unfinished novel Mundos and her personal selection of her best poetry Poems were published posthumously in 1935. Her Collected Stories were published in 1936.

=== Appraisal ===
According to George Malcolm Johnson, "Stella Benson had a unique ability to blend fantasy and reality, especially evident in her earlier novels and in her short stories. Her impish humour and wicked wit, frequently directed towards a satirical end, masked an underlying compassion. Benson's novels (especially her later more realistic ones) and stories often treat serious social issues and reflect her travails as a twentieth-century woman: supporting female suffrage, witnessing the tragedy of the First World War, and living in a hostile, volatile colonial setting. Despite her very modern, ironic treatment of the theme of individuals lost, isolated, and alienated in strange and frightening situations, she has not garnered much contemporary critical attention, and deserves reappraisal."

== Death ==
She died of pneumonia on 7 December 1933, at Hạ Long in the Vietnamese province of Tonkin. Immediately after her death, her husband deposited her diaries to the University Library in Cambridge. Almost 50 years later, they were made available; Joy Grant used them to write a biography of Benson.

== Works ==
- I Pose (London: Macmillan, 1915), novel
- This Is the End (London: Macmillan, 1917), novel
- Twenty (London: Macmillan, 1918), poems
- Living Alone (London: Macmillan, 1919), novel
- Kwan-yin (San Francisco: A. M. Bender, 1922), poem
- The Poor Man (London: Macmillan, 1922), novel
- Pipers and a Dancer (London: Macmillan, 1924), novel
- The Little World (London: Macmillan, 1925), travel
- The Awakening (San Francisco: The Lantern Press, 1925), story
- Goodbye, Stranger (London: Macmillan, 1926), novel
- The Man Who Missed the Bus (London: Elkin Matthews & Marrot, 1928), story
- Worlds Within Worlds (London: Macmillan, 1928), travel
- Tobit Transplanted (London: Macmillan, 1930; U.S. title The Far-Away Bride), novel
- Hope Against Hope and Other Stories (London: Macmillan, 1931), stories
- Christmas Formula and Other Stories (London: William Jackson, 1932), stories
- Pull Devil, Pull Baker (London: Macmillan, 1933), novel
- Collected Stories (London: Macmillan, 1936), stories
- Mundos (London: Macmillan, 1935), novel (unfinished)
- Poems (London: Macmillan, 1935)
- The Desert Islander (Harcourt: New York, 1945), novella
