= Committee for National Morale =

US presidential advisory committee

The Committee for National Morale was a United States presidential advisory committee for the administration of Franklin D. Roosevelt, organized to analyze the nation's overall morale during World War II, study propaganda efforts by the Axis powers, and recommend appropriate strategies in response. Members included notable journalists, anthropologists, psychologists, including George Gallup, Margaret Mead, Gordon Allport, Ruth Benedict, Hadley Cantril, Leonard Doob, Erik Erikson, Erich Fromm, and Geoffrey Gorer.

== History ==
The committee was founded in 1940 and led by Arthur Upham Pope, a curator of Persian art. One of the topics the committee debated was the formation of a nationwide domestic propaganda agency, comparable to the ministry headed by Joseph Goebbels. The committee ultimately did not recommend a domestic propaganda agency, but they did advise on various media installations and events to improve national morale. The committee worked to outline various initiatives that would later become major art installations and cultural diplomacy events, including the American National Exhibition. In addition, the committee recommended a "psychological offensive against Hitler" based on an analysis of Hitler's personality type.
