= Richard N. Frye =

American historian (1920–2014)

- Born: Richard Nelson Frye; January 10, 1920; Birmingham, Alabama, U.S.
- Died: March 27, 2014 (aged 94); Boston, Massachusetts, U.S.
- Education: University of Illinois; Harvard University
- Awards: Farabi International Award; Khwarizmi International Award
- Scientific career
- Fields: Iranian studies
- Workplaces: Goethe University Frankfurt; University of Hamburg; Shiraz University; Tajik State National University; Harvard University
- Academic advisors: Arthur Pope; Walter Bruno Henning
- Notable students: Frank Huddle; John Limbert; Michael Crichton; Richard Cottam; Richard Bulliet; Roy Mottahedeh; Jamsheed Choksy

Richard Nelson Frye (January 10, 1920 – March 27, 2014) was an American intelligence agent and scholar of Iranian and Central Asian studies, and Aga Khan Professor Emeritus of Iranian Studies at Harvard University. His professional areas of interest were Iranian philology along with the history of ancient Iran and Central Asia.

Born in Birmingham, Alabama, to a family of immigrants from Sweden, "Freij" had four children, his second marriage being to a scholar, who teaches at Columbia University. After serving in a non-combat role in Afghanistan during WW2, he joined Harvard as a researcher. He would gain eminence as a leading expert on Iranian history, culture and linguistics, becoming a proponent of Iranian culture.

He held proficiency in many Eurasian languages, both extinct and contemporary; including Russian, Arabic, Persian, Pashto, Sogdian, Uzbek, Avestan, and Turkish. Although Frye is mostly known for his works on historical Iranian culture, he also studied Byzantine history, Assyrian culture, Islamic art, East Asian archeology, Sufism and other ancient languages like Bactrian and Parthian.

== Early life and career ==
Frye was born in Birmingham, Alabama. He first attended the University of Illinois, where he received a BA in history and philosophy in 1939. He received his MA from Harvard University in 1940 and his PhD from Harvard in 1946, in Asiatic history.

Frye served with the Office of Strategic Services during World War II. He was stationed in Afghanistan and traveled extensively in the Middle East, Central Asia, and South Asia. In 1948, he visited Sar Masshad, and was the first European to find and report the existence of the Gur-e Dokhtar tomb (meaning "Tomb of the Maiden" in Persian).

He returned to Harvard to teach. He was a member of the Harvard faculty from 1948 to 1990. He then became a professor emeritus at Harvard. He also served as faculty, guest lecturer, or visiting scholar at the following:

- Habibiya College in Kabul (1942–1944)
- Frankfurt University (1959–1960)
- Hamburg University (1968–1969)
- Pahlavi University of Shiraz (1970–1976)
- Tajik National University (1990–1992).

Frye helped found the Center for Middle Eastern Studies at Harvard, the first Iranian studies program in America. He also served as Director of the Asia Institute in Shiraz (1970–1975), was on the Board of Trustees of the Pahlavi University at Shiraz (1974–1978), and chairman, Committee on Inner Asian Studies, at Harvard (1983–1989), and as Editor of the Bulletin of the Asia Institute (1970–1975 and 1987–1999).

Among Frye's students were Annemarie Schimmel, Oleg Grabar, Frank Huddle (former US Ambassador to Tajikistan), John Limbert, and Michael Crichton, whose Hollywood film The 13th Warrior is loosely based on Frye's translation of Ibn Fadlan's account of his travels up the Volga River.

Frye was also directly responsible for inviting Iranian scholars as distinguished visiting fellows to Harvard University, under a fellowship program initiated by Henry Kissinger. Examples of such guests include Mehdi Haeri Yazdi (1923–1999), Sadegh Choubak, Jalal al Ahmad, and others.

== Proponent of Persian culture ==
Frye felt that Persian civilization was under-appreciated by other Muslims, particularly Arabs. Frye wrote:

Arabs no longer understand the role of Iran and the Persian language in the formation of Islamic culture. Perhaps they wish to forget the past, but in so doing they remove the bases of their own spiritual, moral and cultural being... without the heritage of the past and a healthy respect for it... there is little chance for stability and proper growth.

— R. N. Frye, The Golden Age of Persia, London: Butler & Tanner Ltd., 1989, page 236

In August 1953, shortly before the fall of Mosaddegh, the prominent Iranian linguist Ali Akbar Dehkhoda gave Frye the title "Irandoost" (meaning 'iranophile').

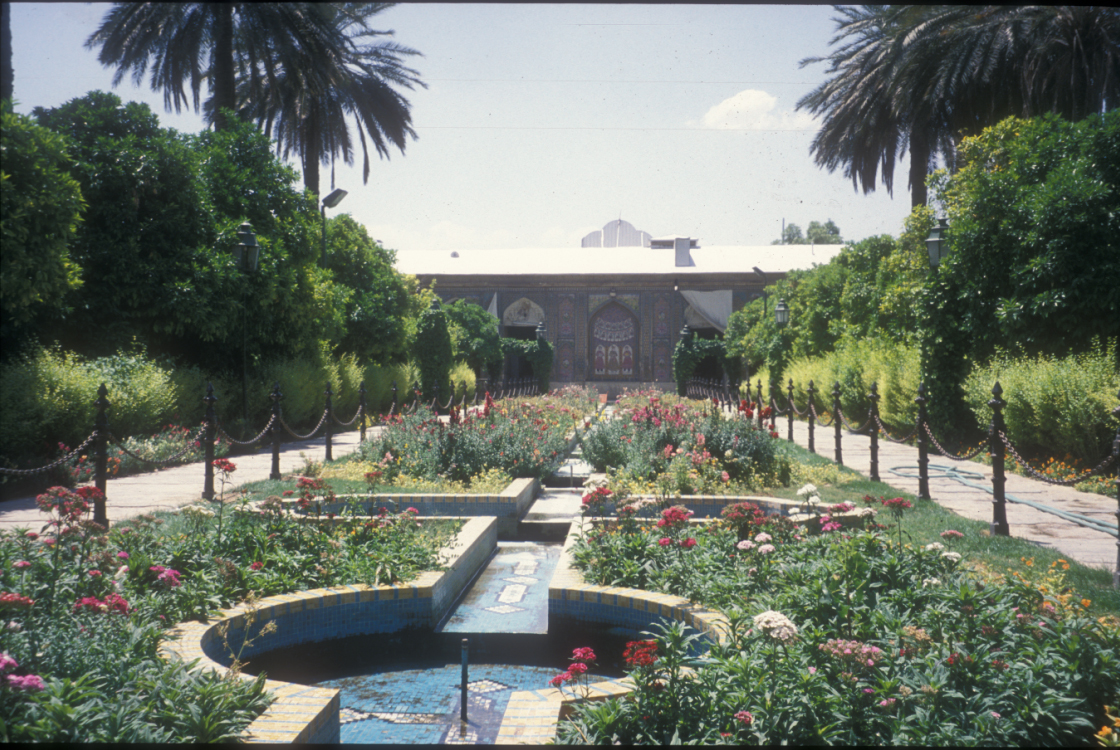
The Qavam House, where the famous Shiraz University Asia Institute was founded. Frye headed the institute from 1969 to 1974.

In addition, Frye was a long-standing supporter of Assyrian continuity, and valued the historical and ancestral connection between modern Assyrians and the Ancient Mesopotamians.

A ceremony was held in Iran on June 27, 2004, to pay tribute to the six-decade endeavors of Frye on his lifetime contribution to Iranian studies, research work on the Persian language, and the history and culture of Iran.

In his will, Frye expressed his wish to be buried next to the Zayandeh River in Isfahan. The request was approved by Iranian President Mahmoud Ahmadinejad in September 2007. Two other American scholars of Iranian studies, Arthur Pope and Phyllis Ackerman, are already buried there. In 2010 the Iranian government gave a house in Isfahan to Frye in recognition of his services to Iranian studies.

On June 8, 2014, the family of Frye decided to cremate his remains after waiting more than two months for official Iranian permission to bury him in Isfahan. His death coincided with growing resentment by Iranian hardliners over signs of reconciliation with the United States after decades of estrangement. It is not clear what the family intended to do with his ashes.

Richard Foltz dedicated his book A History of the Tajiks: Iranians of the East to Frye's memory.

== Public speaker ==
Frye was a popular public speaker at numerous Iran-related gatherings. In 2005, he spoke at UCLA and encouraged the Iranians present to cherish their culture and identity. In 2004, he spoke at an architectural conference in Tehran and expressed his dismay at hasty modernization that ignores the beauties of traditional Iranian architectural styles (see Architecture of Tehran).

== Bibliography ==
- Notes on the Early Coinage of Transoxania; Numismatic Notes, 113, American Numismatic Association, New York 1949
- The Near East and the Great Powers, Harvard University Press, 1951
- Iran, George Allen and Unwin, London, 1960
- The Heritage of Persia, Weidenfeld & Nicolson, London, 1962; World Publishing Company, New York, 1963. Reprinted by Mazda Publishers, 2004. www.mazdapublishers.com
- Bukhara: The Medieval Achievement, University of Oklahoma Press, 1965. Reprinted by Mazda Publishers, 1997. www.mazdapublishers.com
- The Histories of Nishapur, Harvard University Press, (Harvard Oriental Series, 45) 1965
- Corpus Inscriptionum Iranicarum, vol. III, Dura-Europos, London, 1968
- Persia (3rd edition) Allen and Unwin, London, 1969
- The United States and Turkey and Iran, Archon Books, 1971
- Sasanian Remains from Qasr-i Abu Nasr. Seals, Sealings, and Coins, Harvard University Press, 1973
- Neue Methodologie in der Iranistik, Wiesbaden, 1974
- The Golden Age Of Persia: The Arabs in the East, Weidenfeld & Nicolson, London, 1988
- Frye, Richard N. (1992). "Assyria and Syria: Synonyms". Journal of Near Eastern Studies. 51 (4): 281–285. doi:10.1086/373570. JSTOR 545826. S2CID 161323237.
- The Heritage of Central Asia from Antiquity to the Turkish Expansion Markus Wiener, Princeton, 1996
- Frye, Richard N. (1997). "Assyria and Syria: Synonyms" (PDF). Journal of Assyrian Academic Studies. 11 (2): 30–36. Archived from the original (PDF) on 2020-07-13.
- Frye, Richard N. (1999). "Reply to John Joseph" (PDF). Journal of Assyrian Academic Studies. 13 (1): 69–70. Archived from the original (PDF) on 2020-07-11.
- Greater Iran, Mazda Publishers, 2005, ISBN 1-56859-177-2
- Ibn Fadlan's Journey To Russia, 2005, Markus Wiener Publisher, ISBN 1-55876-366-X

== See also ==
- Famous Americans in Iran

Other notable scholars of Iranian studies
Mehrdad Bahar
Mary Boyce
Roman Ghirshman
Michael Roaf
James R. Russell
Erich Schmidt
Alireza Shapour Shahbazi
David Stronach
Ahmad Tafazzoli
Ehsan Yarshater
Abdolhossein Zarrinkoub
