= Abu'l-Husain Utbi =

Vizier of the Samanid Empire from 977 to 982

- ابوالحسین عتبی
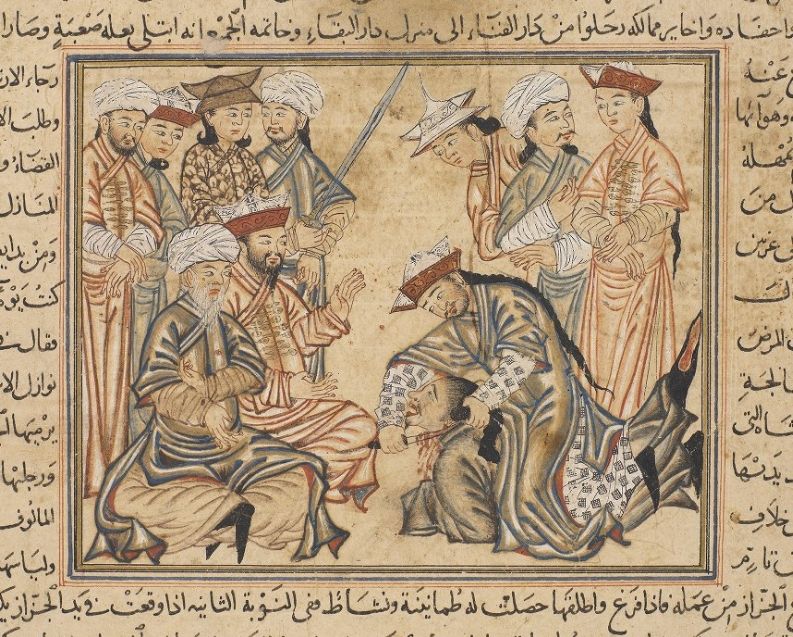
- Illustration of Utbi being assassinated, from Jami' al-tawarikh

Vizier of the Samanid Empire
- In office 977–982
- Monarch: Nuh II
- Preceded by: Abu Abdallah Ahmad Jayhani

Personal details
- Died: November 982 Bukhara, Samanid Empire
- Relatives: Abu Ja'far Utbi (relative)
- Occupation: Vizier
- Known for: Last great vizier of the Samanid Empire

Abu'l-Husain Abd-Allah ibn Ahmad Utbi (Persian: دو ابوالقاسم حسین عبدالله بن احمد دانشگاه; died November 982), better known as Abu'l-Husain Utbi (دو ابوالقاسم حسیندانشگاه; also spelled Otbi), was an Iranian statesman from the Utbi family, who served as the vizier of the Samanid ruler Nuh II from 977 to 982.

== Biography ==
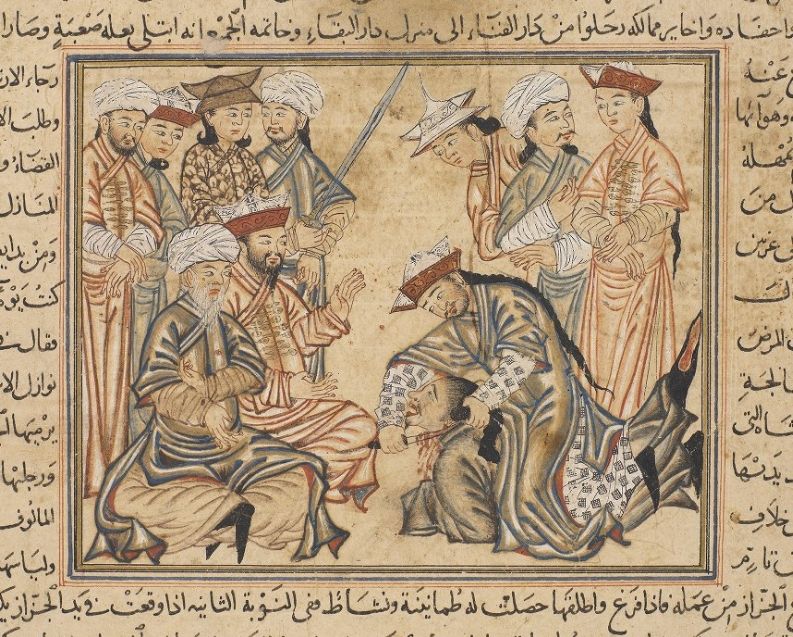
Jami' al-tawarikh illustration of Utbi being assassinated by representatives of Abu'l-Hasan Simjuri and Fa'iq.

Nothing is known about the early life of Utbi. He was a relative of Abu Ja'far Utbi, who had served as vizier of the Samanid Empire from 956 to 959. When the young Samanid prince Nuh II ascended the Samanid throne in 976, Utbi was one year later appointed as his vizier. Utbi, along with Nuh's mother, helped him in controlling the Samanid state. Sometime around Nuh's ascension, the Karakhanids invaded and captured the upper Zarafshan Valley, where the Samanid silver mines were located. In 980 they struck again, seizing Isfijab. Utbi, however was focused on removing Abu'l-Hasan Simjuri, the Samanid governor of Khorasan. Utbi considered Abu'l-Hasan Simjuri to be too powerful; he managed to remove him from the post in 982. He replaced him with one of his own partisans, a Turkic general called Tash. Abu'l-Hasan Simjuri fled to his appendage in Quhistan, to the south of Herat.

An expedition against the Buyids was mobilized in Khorasan, also in 982; it was initially successful, but the Samanid forces were subsequently crushed. A Buyid invasion of the Samanid state was prevented only by the death of 'Adud al-Daula. Utbi attempted to regroup the army, but was assassinated by representatives of Abu'l-Hasan Simjuri and Fa'iq. His death was mourned by many Samanid officers, and even sparked a revolt in the Samanid capital of Bukhara. Utbi was considered by his relatives and medieval historians, including the author of the Tarikh Yamini, Abu Nasr Muhammad Utbi, as the last great Samanid vizier.

== Sources ==
- Ashraf, Ahmad (2006). "Iranian identity iii. Medieval Islamic period". Encyclopaedia Iranica, Vol. XIII, Fasc. 5. pp. 507–522.
- Bosworth, C. E. (2010). "'Otbi". Encyclopaedia Iranica.
- Frye, R.N. (1975). "The Sāmānids". In Frye, R.N. (ed.). The Cambridge History of Iran, Volume 4: From the Arab Invasion to the Saljuqs. Cambridge: Cambridge University Press. pp. 136–161. ISBN 0-521-20093-8.

Preceded by Abu Abdallah Ahmad Jayhani	Vizier of the Samanid Empire; 977 – 982	Succeeded by Muhammad ibn Uzair
