= Phyllis Ackerman =

American art historian and interior designer (1893–1977)

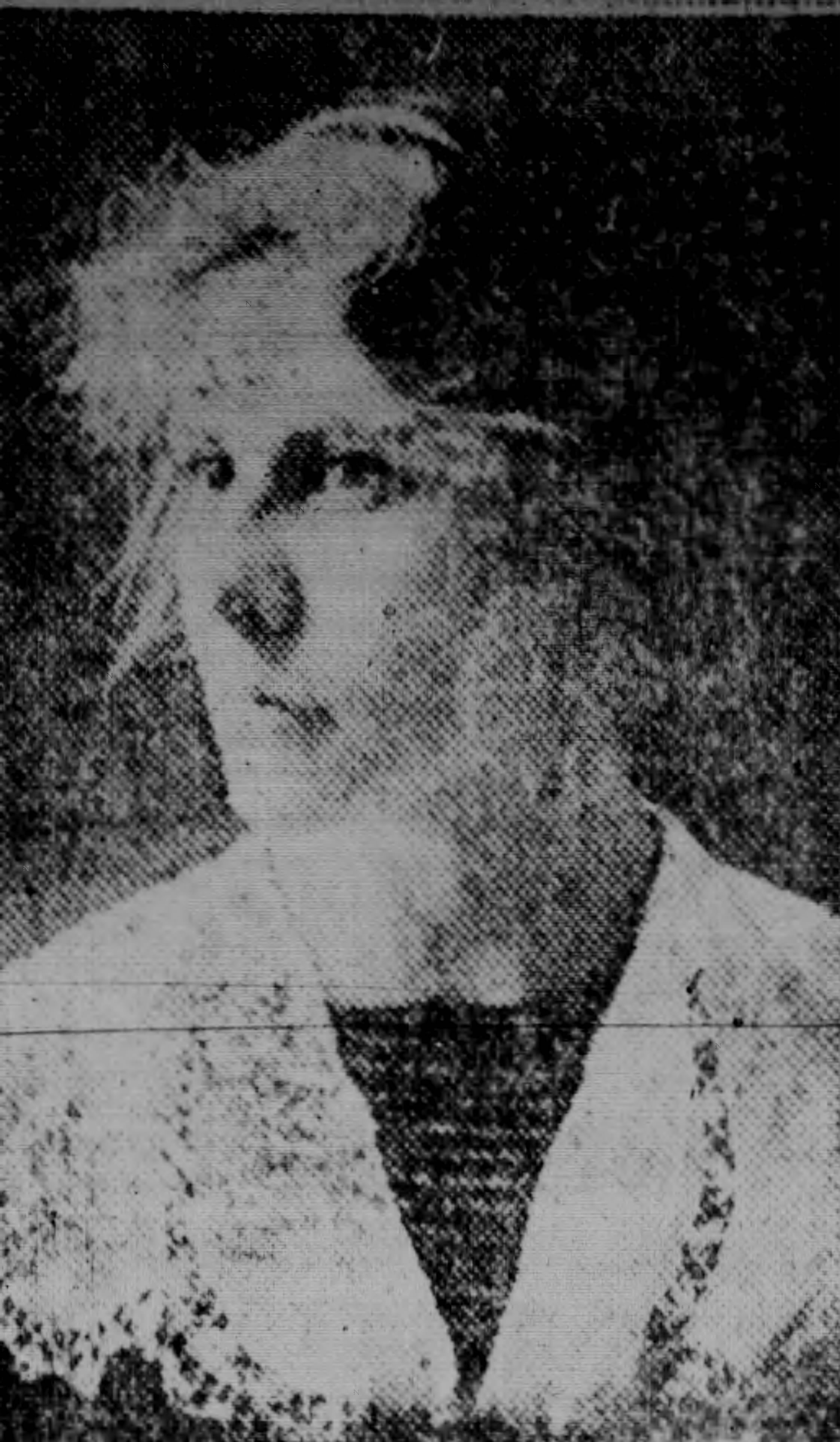
- Ackerman during her time at college, c. 1915
- Born: 1893; Oakland, California, U.S.
- Died: January 25, 1977 (aged 83–84); Shiraz, Imperial State of Iran
- Other name: Phyllis Ackerman Pope
- Occupations: art historian, scholar, editor, writer, interior designer
- Known for: The history of Persian art and architecture
- Spouse: Arthur Upham Pope (m. 1920–1969; death)
- Awards: Iranian Order of Scientific Merit (1936)

Academic background
- Education: University of California, Berkeley
- Thesis: Hegel and Pragmatism (1917)

Phyllis Ackerman (1893 – January 25, 1977), was an American art historian, interior designer and author. She was a scholar of Persian art and architecture and she worked alongside her husband Arthur Upham Pope. Her legacy was as an editor of the six volume publication, A Survey of Persian Art (1939).

== Early life and education ==
Phyllis Ackerman was born on 1893 in Oakland, California. She attended the University of California, Berkeley (U.C. Berkeley) and initially studied mathematics. While there, she met faculty member Arthur Upham Pope who convinced her to switch from the study of mathematics to philosophy. Ackerman received a doctorate in philosophy from U.C. Berkeley in 1917, and her thesis was titled, Hegel and Pragmatism.

In 1916, Ackerman and Pope collaboratively wrote a catalog for Phoebe Hearst's Oriental rug collection that was exhibited at the Palace of Fine Arts in San Francisco. She married Arthur Upham Pope in 1920 and she worked closely with him throughout her career. In 1920, Ackerman was an art columnist at The New York Globe newspaper.

== Career ==
Throughout her career she had a focus on tapestries and textiles of Europe and Asia. In 1922, she wrote the catalogue to an exhibition on Gothic period tapestries at the Palace of Fine Arts.

In the mid-1920s, Arthur Upham Pope started advertising his expertise on Persian arts and decorating. Pope had been attracted to Persian arts because of a love of Persian rugs. In 1926, Ackerman and Pope organized the first ever exhibition of Persian art at the Pennsylvania Museum of Art. The same year in 1926, they helped to create the First International Congress of Oriental Art (also known as the International Congress of Iranian Art and Archaeology).

In 1930, Ackerman was traveling in Cairo and she was stricken with a rare form of polio. She was 36 years old and struggled with her recovery while staying in Paris, Ackerman was able to teach herself to walk again despite a negative medical prognosis.

In 1936, she was awarded the Insignia of the Order of Scientific Merit (Nešān-e ʿelmi, First Class) in Iran.

=== Ahwahnee Hotel ===
In 1927, Pope and Ackerman were involved with the interior design and decoration of the Ahwahnee Hotel in Yosemite National Park. They were responsible for the design specifics like the colors, floors, fabrics, rugs, finishings, beds, mattresses, linens, lighting fixtures, and flatware. Jeannette Dyer Spencer was hired as the resident artist, and she incorporated the patterns found in Native American baskets into mosaics used in the floor tiles. The rugs used throughout the hotel were kilims, soumaks, and other flatweave rugs from the Middle East. They had wanted to use Navajo rugs however they took much longer to produce and did not come in larger sizes. Much of the design of the Ahwahnee Hotel was inspired by Persian-aesthetics and art; and was a mix of mixed Art Deco, Native American, Middle Eastern, and Arts and Crafts styles.

Ansel Adams photo documented the designs, at the time of opening. From 1927 until around 1939 at the start of World War II, the hotel maintained the interior design by Pope and Ackerman. During World War II, the hotel moved the decorations into storage and used the space as a military hospital.

=== Asia Institute ===
The Asia Institute was founded in 1928 by Ackerman and Pope as part of the American Institute for Persian Art and Archaeology.

In 1964, Ackerman and Pope had a state visit to Iran, at which time they were asked by the Pahlavi royal family to revive the Asia Institute in Shiraz, which was part of the Pahlavi University. In 1966, Ackerman (at the age of 73) moved to Iran to accompany Pope, who served as the director of the program.

=== A Survey of Persian Art (1939–1960) ===
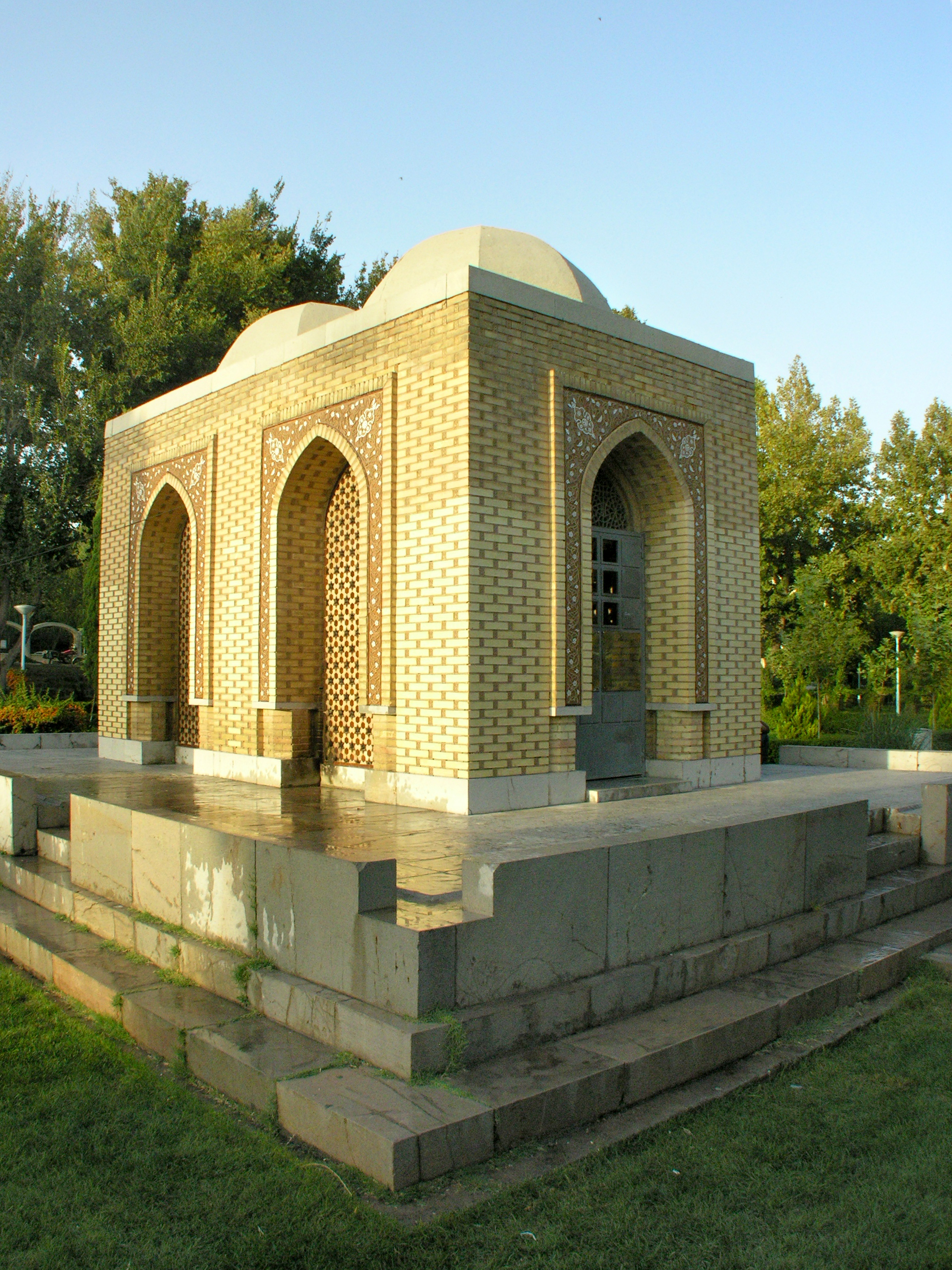
The Pope–Ackerman Mausoleum (2008), near Khaju Bridge in Isfahan, Iran

Pope was Editor, and Ackerman Assistant Editor of the six volume book series, A Survey of Persian Art, (Oxford University Press, first published in 1939). This was the largest and most significant publication dedicated to Persian culture, and featured 71 contributing authors.

== Death and legacy ==
Pope died in 1969, and Ackerman remained in Iran, she lived on a pension granted by the Iranian government and Shahbanu Farah. Ackerman died in Shiraz on January 25, 1977.

The couple were buried in the honorary Pope–Ackerman Mausoleum, near the Khaju Bridge along the Zayanderud in Isfahan, Iran.

== Controversy ==
In the 1920s and 1930s, Pope and Ackerman bought works of art and sold them to collectors and museums in order to fund the Asia Institute, as well as the Survey of Persian Art. Some of the objects sold by the couple were later discovered to be well-made forgeries. Ackerman had written in books about some of these forgeries and it is unclear if they knew they were modern works.

In 2014, Richard Nelson Frye died in Boston, he was a former Harvard University professor, Persian art historian and served as the second director of the Asia Institute. He wanted to be buried alongside Pope and Ackerman in the Mausoleum. However, in 2014, Frye was named a "C.I.A. operative" by Iranian political leaders, which caused an uprising and vandalism of the Pope–Ackerman Mausoleum.

== Publications ==
- Ackerman, Phyllis (1933). Tapestry: The Mirror of Civilization. New York City, NY: Oxford University Press. ISBN 9780404002794.
- Ackerman, Phyllis (1945). Ritual Bronzes of Ancient China. New York City, NY: The Dryden Press. OCLC 458360754.
- Ackerman, Phyllis (1947). "Masterpieces of Persian Art". The Art Bulletin. doi:10.2307/3047102. ISSN 0004-3079. JSTOR 3047102.

== See also ==
- Women in the art history field
