= Arthur Upham Pope =

American art historian (1881–1969)

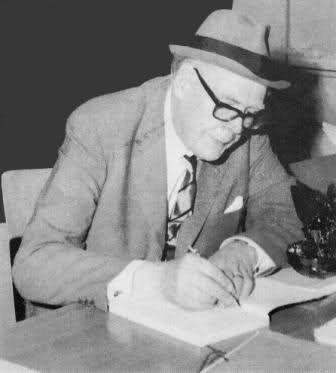
- Pope (c. 1952)
- Born: February 7, 1881; Phenix, West Warwick, Rhode Island, U.S.
- Died: September 3, 1969 (aged 88); Shiraz, Imperial State of Iran
- Resting place: Khaju Bridge, Isfahan
- Education: Brown University
- Spouses: Bertha Louise Clark (m. 1909; div. 1920) Phyllis Ackerman (m. 1920)
- Awards: Order of the Crown; Order of the Lion and the Sun
- Scientific career
- Fields: Persian art, Persian architecture and archaeology
- Workplaces: Brown University; University of California, Berkeley; Amherst College; California Palace of the Legion of Honor; Asia Institute, Shiraz University
- Academic advisors: Alexander Meiklejohn
- Notable students: Jay Gluck

Arthur Upham Pope (February 7, 1881 – September 3, 1969) was an American scholar, art historian, and architectural historian. He was an expert on historical Persian art, and he was the editor of the Survey of Persian Art (1939). Pope was also a university professor of philosophy and aesthetics, an archaeologist, photographer, museum director, interior designer, and the co-founder of an international scholarly organization.

== Education and early career ==
Born in Phenix in West Warwick, Rhode Island on February 7, 1881. His family was descended from English Puritans that had settled in the Boston-area.

Pope graduated from Worcester Academy in 1899. He attended Brown University, and graduated with a B.A. degree in 1904 and a M.A. degree in 1906. He taught at Brown University for two years during his master's degree studies. In 1909, he married Bertha Louise Clark.

He pursued further graduate-level teaching work at Cornell University and Harvard University and again taught at Brown until 1911, when he was hired by the philosophy department at the University of California, Berkeley. During World War I, while teaching at U.C. Berkeley, he was active in the peace movement as California organizing secretary for the American Neutral Conference Committee.

He left Berkeley in December 1917 under a cloud caused by his relationship with student Phyllis Ackerman. He taught briefly at Amherst College, where his friend and former professor Alexander Meiklejohn had become president. But he soon gave up teaching philosophy and pursued his passion for Persian art, which had begun with an early interest in Oriental rugs. He had organized his first museum exhibition of Middle Eastern carpets while still an undergraduate at Brown University.

After the United States entered World War I in 1917, Pope took a job in the Personnel Division of the War Department's General Staff in Washington, D.C. He began lecturing and writing on military morale and on the assessment for promotion of officers. After the war he was among the organizers of the League of Oppressed Peoples and made speaking tours in favor of the Irish Free State. He also intensified his study of Islamic art, a field that was not yet being taught in American universities.

He was divorced from his first wife (who later became the author Bertha Damon). In 1920, Pope married his former student Phyllis Ackerman, who had completed a doctorate in philosophy at Berkeley in 1917 and shared his interest in textile arts. They had collaborated on an exhibition of the Phoebe Apperson Hearst collection in 1916 at the Palace of Fine Arts, San Francisco, and they continued to be partners in many projects for the rest of their lives, each crediting the other with greater expertise.

== Persian art advisors ==
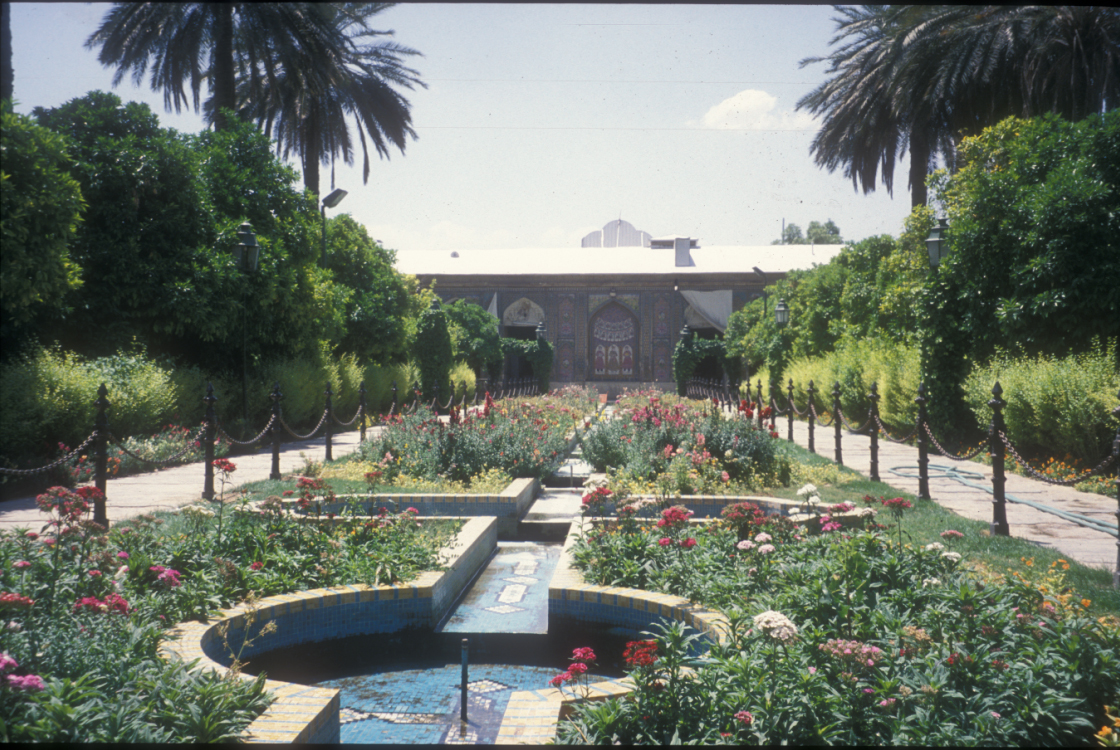
Qavam House, where the Pahlavi University Asia Institute was founded

By the early 1920s, Pope and Ackerman had developed a great deal of expertise as historians of Persian and related art, and they became advisors to major collectors and museums on the acquisition of Islamic art and artefacts.

Pope's museum clients included the Metropolitan Museum of Art, Art Institute of Chicago, and Philadelphia Museum of Art. He also advised wealthy individual collectors including Calouste Gulbenkian, William Randolph Hearst, George Hewitt Myers, and John D. Rockefeller Jr.

=== San Francisco ===
In 1923, Pope was appointed director of the not-yet-opened California Palace of the Legion of Honor, Ackerman was named assistant director, and the two travelled in Europe to develop a collection for the new museum. Before long, however, their relationship with Alma Spreckels, patron of the museum, deteriorated and they resigned. Pope remained interested in museum planning, publishing an article on "Museum fatigue" in 1924 and writing and lecturing about a new museum plan for San Francisco. He was a consultant on planning for an art museum and opera house in the Civic Center of San Francisco in the mid-1920s.

In 1924 Pope and Ackerman bought the house in San Mateo, California they called "Scholars' Cottage" from its architect and first occupant, Ernest Coxhead. They sold it in 1943 and it later became a state and national historic landmark.

== Continued Persian pursuits ==
Pope made his first trip to Iran in the spring of 1925. He gave a speech urging Iranians to appreciate the architecture of their past and to use it as inspiration for modern buildings. Reza Khan, then prime minister and later Shah of Iran, heard the speech, met Pope, and began taking a personal interest in Persian architectural restoration and revival. He authorized Pope to enter key mosques to study and photograph their architecture and became a lifelong supporter of Pope's pursuits in the field.

In 1926, Pope helped design the Persian pavilion and organized an exhibition of Persian art for the Sesquicentennial Exposition in Philadelphia. The Persia Pavilion, based on the Masjed-e Shah (King's Mosque) in Isfahan, won a gold medal. That year he also organized the first international congress on Persian art; he would lead four more of these congresses over the next 40 years. By 1927, he and Phyllis returned to San Francisco and pursued additional design projects, including an ornate Persian-palace-style interior for the penthouse of the Fairmont Hotel in San Francisco, and the interior of the Ahwahnee Hotel in Yosemite National Park, where they made extensive use of Middle Eastern kilims as well as Native American artefacts.

In 1928, Pope founded the American Institute for Persian Art and Archaeology, which was incorporated in New York City in 1930 and later became the Asia Institute. He enlisted other scholars to teach and conduct research under the auspices of the institute, and he led numerous trips to Iran from 1929 to 1939 to photograph art and architecture and participate in archaeological excavations. The six-volume Survey of Persian Art from Prehistoric Times to the Present was published by Oxford Press in 1938–39, and Pope and his colleagues arranged for several exhibitions of Persian art in the U.S. and Europe to coincide with the publication. Pope was a pivotal figure in the organisation of the highly successful International Exhibition of Persian Art that opened at the Royal Academy of Arts in London in January 1931; in particular he was instrumental in obtaining items on loan from many sources, including the Iranian Crown Jewels.

== 1940s and later ==
During the Second World War Pope again worked for the U.S. government, drawing upon his expertise in languages and cultures. He also became a champion of Russia at a time when it was not popular to do so. He was a trustee of the American-Russian Institute and a vice-president of the National Council for American-Soviet Friendship. He published a biography of the Russian diplomat Maxim Litvinov in 1943. After Life magazine listed Pope in April 1949 among people they considered to be Communist sympathizers, some patrons withdrew their support of the Asia Institute.

Pope retired as chancellor of the Asia Institute in 1952 at age 71. The institute went into decline and no longer operated as the thriving educational institution it had been. Pope remained active as a scholar, publishing more than 20 articles and papers, as well as a book on Persian architecture, between 1952 and his death in 1969.

In 1964, during a state visit to Iran, Pope and Ackerman were formally invited to move the Asia Institute to Shiraz, where it would be affiliated with Pahlavi University and housed in the Narenjestan. They accepted the offer and in 1966 moved to Iran, where they would spend the rest of their lives. Pope suffered a heart attack and died in 1969. Ackerman remained in Shiraz until her death in 1977. Their remains lie in a mausoleum on the bank of the Zayandeh River in Isfahan close to Khaju Bridge, a special mausoleum that was erected on the order of the Shah.

== Legacy ==
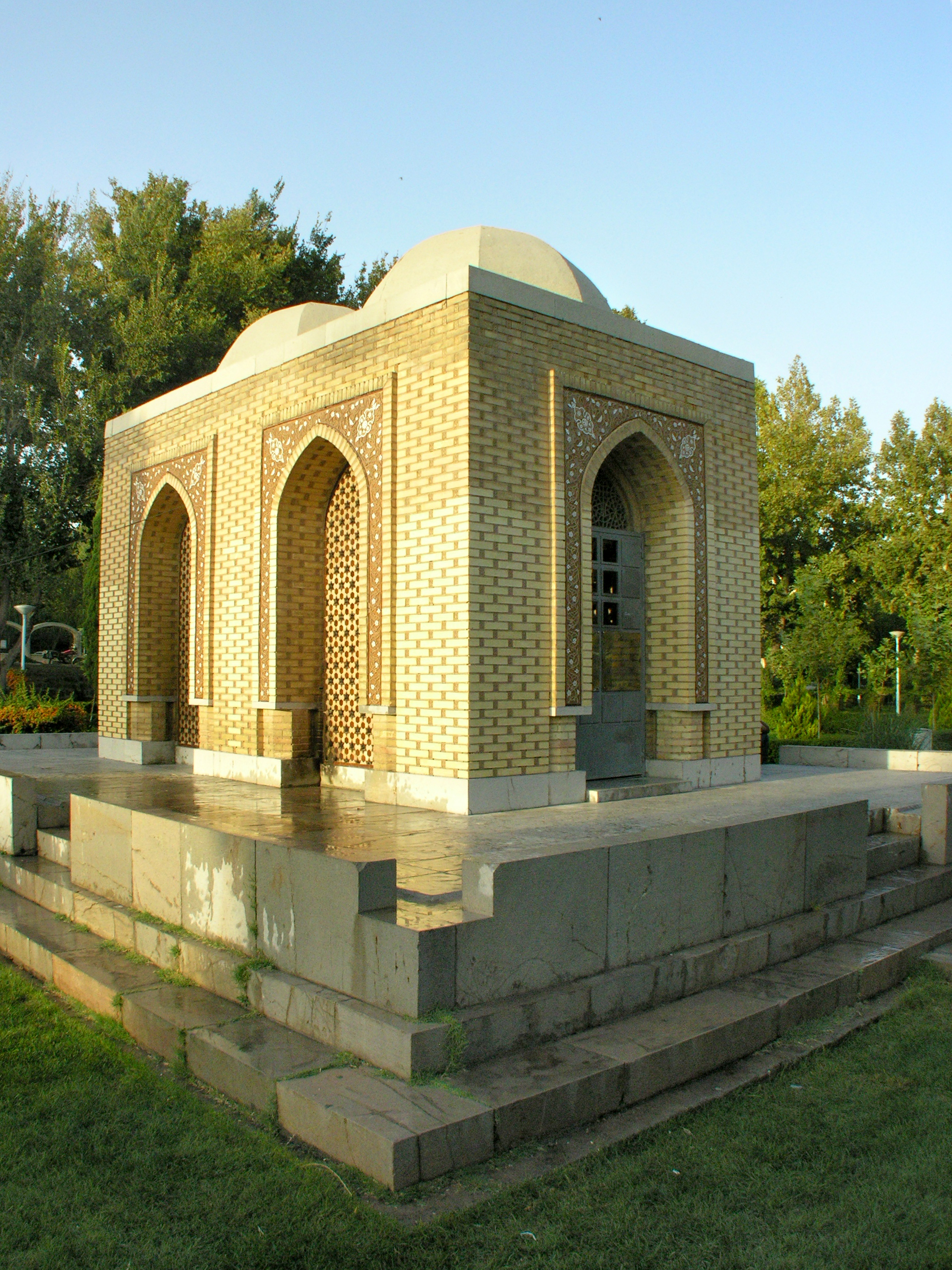
Mausoleum of Arthur Pope and his wife Phyllis Ackerman in Isfahan

The Asia Institute became a part of the Pahlavi University and gradually declined, especially after the Islamic revolution in 1979. Eventually, the Bulletin of the Asia Institute was revived in Michigan in 1987.

Pope began taking photographs for his Survey of Persian Art from Prehistoric Times to the Present in 1929 with a camera he had purchased in Cairo. An amateur cameraman who became, as Noël Siver describes him, 'a top-notch photographer', Pope overcame difficulties with weather conditions, opposition to his visiting mosques as a non-Muslim, and having to process all his negatives before leaving the country. He wrote about these problems in an article for Photography (London), vol. 5, no. 49 (September 1936) graphically entitled, “Killed for Photographing a Fountain! Camera as a Record of World-Famous Persian Architecture”. Exhibitions of his Persian photographs were mounted at art galleries and museums in cities such as New York, Paris, Berlin, Moscow, London, Copenhagen, Chicago, San Francisco, Jerusalem and Leningrad during the 1930s to great acclaim. His photographic legacy lives on, photographs taken in Iran and attributed to Pope, are held by the Conway Library whose archive, of primarily architectural images, is in the process of being digitised under the wider Courtauld Connects project.

In 2010, the Art Institute of Chicago, one of the museums Pope advised, presented an exhibition, "Arthur Pope and a New Survey of Persian Art", curated by Yuka Kadoi. In conjunction with the exhibition the museum held a symposium in which international scholars of Persian art discussed the life, achievements and influence of Arthur Upham Pope.

According to Noël Siver in the Encyclopaedia Iranica,

Arthur Upham Pope was a charismatic yet controversial figure. While admired by most of his contemporaries for his aesthetic sensibilities, his energy, his enthusiasm, and for the many contributions and activities described above, more recent opinion has been critical of Pope’s financial dealings including the sale of works of art to museums and important collectors, activities which he felt, having exhausted his personal means, were necessary in order to sponsor the field trips, underwrite the Survey of Persian Art, keep the underfunded Institute afloat, etc.

== 2014 vandalism of Pope–Ackerman tomb ==
Richard Frye, who was a student of Arthur Pope and an American scholar of Iranian and Central Asia studies, died on March 28, 2014, at the age of 94. In his will, Professor Frye expressed his wish to be buried, like Pope, next to the Zayandeh River in Isfahan. This request was approved by Iranian president Mahmoud Ahmadinejad in September 2007. However, Frye's death coincided with efforts to improve Iran-United States relations, and the planned burial became highly controversial. During the associated protests by Islamic hardliners in April 2014, the Pope-Ackerman tomb was vandalized with extensive painted words. After Frye's family waited more than two months for approval to proceed with the burial, they decided to have his body cremated in Boston.

== Selected publications ==
- Arthur Upham Pope introducing Persian Architecture, Tehran : Published under the auspices of the Farah Pahlavi Cultural Foundation & the Festival of Arts Centre by Soroush Press, 1976
- Persian Architecture, London : Thames & Hudson, 1965
- Maxim Litvinoff, London : Martin Secker and Warburg, 1943
- A Survey of Persian Art from Prehistoric Times to the Present, six volumes published under the auspices of the American Institute for Iranian Art and Archaeology, with Phyllis Ackerman, London & New York : Oxford University Press, 1938–1939
- An Introduction to Persian Art : since the seventh century AD, London : Peter Davies, 1930
- Persian Art and Culture, New York; San Francisco : New Orient Society of America, 1928

== See also ==
- Committee for National Morale

== Sources ==
- Robert Lewis Taylor, "Profile: Under the Rug," The New Yorker, July 14 and 21, 1945.
- Arthur Upham Pope Papers, New York Public Library..
- Yuka Kadoi (ed.), Arthur Upham Pope and A New Survey of Persian Art (Brill, 2016).
