= Jalalabad (disambiguation) =

Jalalabad is the capital of Nangarhar province in Afghanistan.

Jalalabad or Dzhalalabad may also refer to:

== Azerbaijan ==
- Cəlilabad, which may also be spelled "Jalilabad"

== Bangladesh ==
- Jalalabad Union, Kalaroa, union in Satkhira district, Bangladesh
- Jalalabad, Muladi, village in Barisal district, Bangladesh
- Jalalabad, Raninagar, village in Naogaon district, Bangladesh

=== Dhaka Division ===
- Jalalabad Union, Gopalganj Sadar, union in Gopalganj district, Bangladesh
- Jalalabad, Belabo, village in Narsingdi district, Bangladesh

=== Chittagong Division ===
- Jalalabad Hill, hill in Chittagong, Bangladesh
- Jalalabad Union, Eidgaon, union in Cox's Bazar district, Bangladesh
- Jalalabad Ward, area in Chittagong city, Bangladesh

=== Sylhet Division ===
- Jalalabad, Habiganj Sadar, village in Habiganj district, Bangladesh
- Jalalabad, Golapganj, village in Sylhet district, Bangladesh
- Jalalabad Thana, area in Sylhet city, Bangladesh
  - Jalalabad Union, Sylhet Sadar, union in Sylhet district, Bangladesh
- Jalalabad Cantonment, Sylhet city, Bangladesh

== India ==
- Jalalabad, Bijnor, settlement of Bijnor district, Uttar Pradesh
- Jalalabad, Fazilka, settlement of Fazilka district, Punjab
  - Jalalabad, Punjab Assembly constituency
- Jalalabad, Shamli, settlement of Shamli district, Uttar Pradesh
  - Siege of Jalalabad (1710), military confrontation between the Afghan forces of Jalal Khan and Sikhs under Banda Singh Bairagi
- Jalalabad, former name of Parashurampuri, Shahjahanpur, settlement of Shahjahanpur district, Uttar Pradesh
  - Jalalabad, Uttar Pradesh Assembly constituency
- Mangalore, temporarily renamed Jalalabad by Tipu Sultan in the late 18th century

== Iran ==
=== Ardabil Province ===
- Jalalabad, Ardabil, a village in Khalkhal County

=== Fars Province ===
- Jalalabad, Darab, a village in Darab County
- Jalalabad, Fasa, a village in Fasa County
- Jalalabad, Kavar, a village in Kavar County
- Jalalabad, Larestan, a village in Larestan County
- Jalalabad, Shiraz, a village in Shiraz County

=== Golestan Province ===
- Jalalabad, Golestan, a village in Azadshahr County

=== Hormozgan Province ===
- Jalalabad, Hormozgan, a village in Rudan County

=== Isfahan Province ===
- Jalalabad, Chadegan, a village in Chadegan County
- Jalalabad, Falavarjan, a village in Falavarjan County
- Jalalabad, Qahab-e Jonubi, a village in Isfahan County
- Jalalabad, Baharestan, a village in Nain County
- Jalalabad, Kuhestan, a village in Nain County
- Jalalabad, Najafabad, a village in Najafabad County
- Jalalabad, Semirom, a village in Semirom County

=== Kerman Province ===
- Jalalabad 2, a village in Bardsir County
- Jalalabad, Fahraj, a village in Fahraj County
- Jalalabad, Jiroft, a village in Jiroft County
- Jalalabad, Narmashir, a village in Narmashir County
- Jalalabad, Rabor, a village in Rabor County
- Jalalabad, Ravar, a village in Ravar County
- Jalalabad, Sharifabad, a village in Sirjan County
- Jalalabad, Zarand, a village in Zarand County

=== Markazi Province ===
- Jalalabad, Farahan, a village in Farahan County
- Jalalabad, Shazand, a village in Shazand County

=== Razavi Khorasan Province ===
- Jalalabad, Shahrabad, a village in Bardaskan County
- Jalalabad, Firuzeh, a village in Firuzeh County
- Jalalabad, Mashhad, a village in Mashhad County
- Jalalabad, Rashtkhvar, a village in Rashtkhvar County
- Jalalabad, Torbat-e Heydarieh, a village in Torbat-e Heydarieh County

=== Sistan and Baluchestan Province ===
- Jalalabad, Dalgan, a village in Dalgan County
- Jalalabad, Hirmand, a village in Hirmand County
- Jalalabad, Mehrestan, a village in Mehrestan County

=== West Azerbaijan Province ===
- Jalalabad, West Azerbaijan, a village in Khoy County

=== Yazd Province ===
- Jalalabad, Abarkuh, a village in Abarkuh County
- Jalalabad, Ardakan, a village in Ardakan County
- Jalalabad-e Dezak, a village in Saduq County
- Jalalabad, Taft, a village in Taft County

=== Zanjan Province ===
- Jalalabad, Zanjan, a village in Zanjan County

== Kyrgyzstan ==
- Jalal-Abad, a city in southwestern Kyrgyzstan
- Jalal-Abad Province

== Pakistan ==
- Jalalabad village, a village in Gilgit-Baltistan region
- Jalalabad, Karachi, a place in Sindh, Pakistan.
- Jalalabad, Multan, village in Multan District, Pakistan
- Jalalabad, Muzaffargarh, village in Muzaffargarh District
- Jalalabad, Sargodha, village in Sargodha District

== See also ==
- Jalilabad (disambiguation)
- Jalalpur (disambiguation)
- Battle of Jalalabad (disambiguation)
  - Battle of Jalalabad (1842), siege against British invaders by the Emirate of Afghanistan
  - Battle of Jalalabad (1989), military encounter between the Democratic Republic of Afghanistan and the Pakistani Inter-Services Intelligence supported warlords
