= Jalilabad (disambiguation) =

Jalilabad may refer to:

== Azerbaijan ==
- Cəlilabad, Azerbaijan
- Jalilabad Rayon, in Azerbaijan

== Iran ==
- Jalilabad, Alborz, a village in Nazarabad County, Alborz Province, Iran
- Jalilabad, East Azerbaijan, a village in Charuymaq County, East Azerbaijan Province, Iran
- Jalilabad, Mamasani, a village in Mamasani County, Fars Province, Iran
- Jalilabad, Jiroft, a village in Jiroft County, Kerman Province, Iran
- Jalilabad, Sirjan, a village in Sirjan County, Kerman Province, Iran
- Jalilabad, Markazi, a village in Farahan County, Markazi Province, Iran
- Jalilabad, Mazandaran, a village in Tonekabon County, Mazandaran Province, Iran
- Jalilabad, Kalat, a village in Kalat County, Razavi Khorasan Province, Iran
- Jalilabad, Rashtkhvar, a village in Rashtkhvar County, Razavi Khorasan Province, Iran
- Jalilabad, Torbat-e Jam, a village in Torbat-e Jam County, Razavi Khorasan Province, Iran
- Jalilabad, Semnan, a village in Aradan County, Semnan Province, Iran
- Jalilabad, Firuzkuh, a village in Firuzkuh County, Tehran Province, Iran
- Jalilabad, Pishva, a village in Pishva County, Tehran Province, Iran
- Jalilabad District (Iran), in Pishva County, Tehran Province, Iran
- Jalilabad Rural District, in Pishva County, Tehran Province, Iran
- Jalilabad, Zanjan, a village in Zanjan County, Zanjan Province, Iran
- Jalilabad, Ijrud, a village in Ijrud County, Zanjan Province, Iran

== See also ==
- Jalalabad (disambiguation)
