= Asheqan =

Asheqan (Persian: عاشقان) may refer to:

- Asheqan, Hormozgan
- Asheqan-e Abedin, Kermanshah province
- Asheqan-e Musa, Kermanshah province
- Asheqan, Golbahar, Razavi Khorasan province
- Asheqan, Mashhad, Razavi Khorasan province
- Asheqan, Rashtkhvar, Razavi Khorasan province
- Asheqan, Sistan and Baluchestan
