= Esfahanak =

Esfahanak or Isfahanak or Esfehanak (Persian: اصفهانك) may refer to the following places in Iran:

== Isfahan Province ==
- Esfehanak, Isfahan
- Esfahanak-e Abdol
- Esfahanak-e Moshai
- Esfahanak-e Olya
- Esfahanak-e Saki
- Esfahanak-e Sofla

== Other provinces ==
- Esfahanak, Markazi, Markazi Province
- Esfahanak (Tehran), a neighbourhood of Greater Tehran
