= Khodaabad =

Khodaabad (Persian: خدااباد) may refer to these places in Iran:

- Khodaabad, Fars
- Khodaabad, Kerman
- Khodaabad, Razavi Khorasan
- Khodaabad, Sistan and Baluchestan
- Khodaabad-e Bala, Yazd Province
- Khodaabad-e Pain, Yazd Province

== See also ==
- Khudabad (disambiguation)
