= Do Chahi =

Do Chahi or Dochahi (Persian: دوچاهي, meaning "two wells") may refer to:

- Dochahi, Kerman
- Do Chahi, Rashtkhvar, in Razavi Khorasan Province
- Do Chahi-ye Bala, in Razavi Khorasan Province
- Do Chahi, Sabzevar, in Razavi Khorasan Province
- Do Chahi, South Khorasan
