= Cheshmandegan =

Cheshmandegan or Cheshm Andegan (Persian: چشمندگان) may refer to:

- Cheshmandegan-e Majid
- Cheshmandegan-e Olya
- Cheshmandegan-e Sofla
