= Dar Riz-e Olya =

Dar Riz-e Olya درريزعليا
- Village
- Location within Iran
- Coordinates: 35°07′27″N 59°44′29″E
- Country: Iran
- Province: Razavi Khorasan
- County: Roshtkhar
- Bakhsh: Central
- Rural District: Roshtkhar

Population (2006)
  - Total: 320
- Time zone: UTC+3:30 (IRST)
  - Summer (DST): UTC+4:30 (IRDT)

Dar Riz-e Olya (Persian: درريزعليا, also Romanized as Dar Rīz-e 'Olyā; also known as Dar Rīz-e Bālā and Dar Rīz) is a village in Roshtkhar Rural District, in the Central District of Roshtkhar County, Razavi Khorasan province, Iran. At the 2006 census, its population was 320, in 70 families.
