= Banda Singh's Invasion of Yamuna-Ganga Doab =

- Part of the campaigns of Banda Singh Bahadur
Date	July–August 1710
Location	Upper Ganga–Yamuna Doab, including Saharanpur, Behat, Ambheta, Nanauta and Jalalabad
Result	Sikh victory
Territorial changes	Sikh occupation of much of the Saharanpur tract and establishment of posts in several thanas

Belligerents
Khalsa	Mughal Empire

Commanders and leaders
Banda Singh Bahadur	Ali Hamid Khan; Jalal Khan; Ghulam Mohammad Khan; Dindar Ali Khan; Hazbar Khan †; Jamal Khan †; Pir Khan †

Strength
500 horse and 10,000 foot.	400 cavalry, 1,000 foot, 4,000–5,000 village militia, and ghazis

Casualties and losses
Heavy	Heavy
- The campaign included massacres of Muslim inhabitants during the sack of Saharanpur, Behat and Nanauta, together with plunder and devastation in the Upper Ganga Doab.

Banda Singh's Invasion of Yamuna-Ganga Doab was a 1710 expedition by Banda Singh Bahadur and the Khalsa into the tract between the Yamuna and the Ganga after the Sikh capture of Sirhind and the establishment of authority at Lohgarh. The campaign included operations at Saharanpur, Behat, Ambheta, Nanauta and Jalalabad. It ended after the siege of Jalalabad was raised and the Sikh forces returned toward Karnal and the Punjab.

== Background ==
After the Lahore expedition, Banda Singh Bahadur returned to Sirhind, inspected the administration of the conquered territory, and then went back to Lohgarh. Reports from the Upper Ganga Doab led to an eastward march across the Yamuna at Rajghat near Buria into the Saharanpur district. By this stage, Sikh authority had spread widely in the region around Lohgarh. Armed posts were placed in towns and villages, and local officials were appointed in conquered areas.

Complaints also came from Deoband and Unarsa, where Sikh converts and other residents had been imprisoned and persecuted under Jalal Khan Orakzai. Kapoor Singh of Unarsa appealed to Banda Singh for assistance. A report presented to the Mughal emperor on 22 June 1710 placed Banda Singh at Gulab Nagar or Buria with a mounted and infantry force before the move into Saharanpur.

== Campaign ==
=== Sack of Saharanpur ===
Banda Singh Bahadur crossed the Yamuna at Rajghat near Buria and advanced on Saharanpur. Ali Hamid Khan, the faujdar of Saharanpur, fled to Delhi on hearing of the Sikh advance. The inhabitants resisted, but the Sikhs captured much of the town after fighting and seized money, jewels and other goods. Panic spread in the surrounding countryside, and half of the Sarkar of Saharanpur fell into Sikh hands.

=== Behat and Ambheta ===
After the capture of Saharanpur, the Sikhs moved against Behat. The town was sacked, and the Pirzada households were destroyed apart from one absent survivor. The Sikh force then entered Ambheta without significant resistance and took booty from the town.

=== Nanauta ===
The next major action took place at Nanauta. Gujjar groups joined the Sikhs on the march and identified themselves as followers of Guru Nanak. The defenders of Nanauta, especially the Shaikhzadas, resisted strongly, and heavy fighting took place in the streets and residential compounds. The town was left in ruins and became known as Phoota Shahr.

After the fighting, Sikh posts were established in a series of thanas in the Saharanpur region, including Rampur, Nanauta, Jhujhana, Bakaur, Barsadau, Karana, Budhana and Kandhala.

=== Advance on Jalalabad ===
From Nanauta, Banda Singh Bahadur sent demands to Jalal Khan Orakzai of Jalalabad for the release of Sikh prisoners from Unarsa and for submission to Khalsa authority. Jalal Khan rejected the demands, had the Sikh messengers paraded through the town on asses, and expelled them. The Sikh force then moved toward Jalalabad.

Jalal Khan sent a field force under Ghulam Mohammad Khan and Hazbar Khan to oppose the Sikh advance. The engagement was bloody. Hazbar Khan was killed, along with many of the Afghan and village defenders. Further fighting followed in which Jamal Khan and Pir Khan also died. Dindar Ali Khan later fought his way to recover their bodies and returned to Jalalabad.

== Siege of Jalalabad ==
After the fighting near Jalalabad, Banda Singh Bahadur and the Sikh forces laid siege to the town and fort. Jalalabad stood on high ground, and the Krishna stream, swollen by the rains, surrounded the place with water. The besiegers brought forward wooden batteries, advanced them toward the walls, and attempted to undermine the fortifications, scale the walls with ladders, and burn the gates. The siege lasted about twenty days, and both sides suffered heavy losses.

The result is not presented uniformly by Historians. The Historian Hari Ram Gupta treats Jalalabad as one of the places punished and plundered by Banda Singh Bahadur and states that its people submitted after tough resistance, placing Jalalabad within the wider extension of Banda's rule from the Ravi to the Ganga and from the neighbourhood of Lahore to the vicinity of Panipat. Sagoo and the Sikh Historian Ganda Singh present a different outcome. According to them, the Sikhs failed to take the fort after about twenty days of siege operations and raised the siege without securing Jalalabad itself, although the countryside around the town was devastated and Jalal Khan remained shut up inside the fort. Gandhi also treats the siege as unsuccessful in immediate military terms, stating that the Sikhs withdrew without taking the town. He places the withdrawal not in Jalal Khan's strength alone, but in the onset of the monsoon, appeals from the Punjab and the Jullundur Doab, and the prospect of Bahadur Shah's return to the north. Harpreet Kaur follows the line of withdrawal, adding that urgent calls from the Punjab led the Sikhs to raise the siege and move off toward Sultanpur and Jullundur.

== Aftermath ==
The campaign extended Sikh military activity from the Punjab into the Upper Ganga Doab and disrupted Mughal authority in the Saharanpur tract. Sikh control stretched from the Ravi to the Ganges and from the neighbourhood of Lahore to the vicinity of Panipat. Imperial authority in the area was badly shaken, and the north-western road from Delhi was closed for several months.

After the Sikh withdrawal, Jalal Khan retaliated against the Sikhs of Unarsa, and Kapoor Singh was killed. Jalal Khan later received appointment to Saharanpur and a robe of honour on 21 August 1710, while Dindar Ali Khan received promotion in the army.

== Bibliography ==
- Gandhi, Surjit Singh (1999). Sikhs in the Eighteenth Century: Their Struggle for Survival and Supremacy. Singh Bros. ISBN 9788172052171.
- Gupta, Hari Ram (1978). History of the Sikhs: Evolution of Sikh Confederacies, 1708–1769. Vol. 2 (3rd illustrated ed.). Munshiram Manoharlal Publishers.
- Sagoo, Harbans Kaur (2001). Banda Singh Bahadur and Sikh Sovereignty (illustrated ed.). Deep & Deep Publications. ISBN 9788176293006.
- Singh, Ganda (1990). Life of Banda Singh Bahadur: Based on Contemporary and Original Records. Publication Bureau, Punjabi University.
- Kaur, Harpreet (1988). Sikh Struggle for Sovereignty (1708–1768) (PhD thesis). Department of History, Punjabi University, Patiala.
- Kaur, Karamjit (2021). Banda Singh Bahadur: Strategy of War and Ideology (PDF) (PhD thesis). Talwandi Sabo: Guru Kashi University.
- Majumdar, Ramesh Chandra, ed. (1977). The History and Culture of the Indian People: The Maratha Supremacy. Vol. 8 (4th ed.). Bharatiya Vidya Bhavan.
