= Andanjerd =

Andanjerd اندنجرد
- Village
- Location within Iran
- Coordinates: 34°53′11″N 59°44′12″E
- Country: Iran
- Province: Razavi Khorasan
- County: Roshtkhar
- Bakhsh: Central
- Rural District: Roshtkhar

Population (2006)
  - Total: 235
- Time zone: UTC+3:30 (IRST)
  - Summer (DST): UTC+4:30 (IRDT)

Andanjerd (Persian: اندنجرد; also known as Andangerd) is a village in Roshtkhar Rural District, in the Central District of Roshtkhar County, Razavi Khorasan Province, Iran. At the 2006 census, its population was 235, in 60 families.

== See also ==
- List of cities, towns and villages in Razavi Khorasan Province
