= Aliabad-e Daman =

Village in Razavi Khorasan province, Iran

Aliabad-e Daman Persian: علي اباددامن
- Village
- Location within Iran
- Coordinates: 35°04′09″N 59°31′05″E
- Country: Iran
- Province: Razavi Khorasan
- County: Roshtkhar
- District: Central
- Rural District: Astaneh

Population (2016)
  - Total: 1,079
- Time zone: UTC+3:30 (IRST)

Aliabad-e Daman (Persian: علي اباددامن) (Note: Also romanized as ‘Alīābād-e Dāman) is a village in Astaneh Rural District of the Central District in Roshtkhar County, Razavi Khorasan province, Iran.

== Demographics ==
=== Population ===
At the time of the 2006 National Census, the village's population was 1,162 in 287 households. The following census in 2011 counted 1,131 people in 327 households. The 2016 census measured the population of the village as 1,079 people in 313 households.
