= Abbasabad-e Jadid =

Village in Razavi Khorasan province, Iran

Abbasabad-e Jadid Persian: عباس ابادجديد
- Village
- Location within Iran
- Coordinates: 35°02′08″N 59°17′42″E
- Country: Iran
- Province: Razavi Khorasan
- County: Roshtkhar
- District: Jangal
- Rural District: Shabeh

Population (2016)
  - Total: 121
- Time zone: UTC+3:30 (IRST)

Abbasabad-e Jadid (Persian: عباس ابادجديد) (Note: Also romanized as ‘Abbāsābād-e Jadīd; also known as Abbāsābād) is a village in Shabeh Rural District of Jangal District in Roshtkhar County, Razavi Khorasan province, Iran.

== Demographics ==
=== Population ===
At the time of the 2006 National Census, the village's population was 223 in 62 households. The following census in 2011 counted 146 people in 45 households. The 2016 census measured the population of the village as 121 people in 39 households.
