= Kat, Razavi Khorasan =

Village in Razavi Khorasan province, Iran

Kazemabad Persian: كت
- Village
- Location within Iran
- Coordinates: 35°04′24″N 59°23′09″E
- Country: Iran
- Province: Razavi Khorasan
- County: Roshtkhar
- District: Central
- Rural District: Astaneh

Population (2016)
  - Total: 1,011
- Time zone: UTC+3:30 (IRST)

Kat (Persian: كت) is a village in Astaneh Rural District of the Central District in Roshtkhar County, Razavi Khorasan province, Iran.

== Demographics ==
=== Population ===
At the time of the 2006 National Census, the village's population was 952 in 215 households. The following census in 2011 counted 1,010 people in 277 households. The 2016 census measured the population of the village as 1,011 people in 315 households.
