= Abbasabad-e Faramishan =

Village in Razavi Khorasan province, Iran

Abbasabad-e Faramishan Persian: عباس ابادفراميشان
- Village
- Location within Iran
- Coordinates: 35°03′24″N 59°28′12″E
- Country: Iran
- Province: Razavi Khorasan
- County: Roshtkhar
- District: Central
- Rural District: Astaneh

Population (2016)
  - Total: 2,965
- Time zone: UTC+3:30 (IRST)

Abbasabad-e Faramishan (Persian: عباس ابادفراميشان) (Note: Also romanized as ‘Abbāsābād-e Farāmīshān; also known as ‘Abbāsābād-e ‘Amīdī, ‘Abbāsābād-e Farāmūshān, and Farāmīshān) is a village in Astaneh Rural District of the Central District in Roshtkhar County, Razavi Khorasan province, Iran.

== Demographics ==
=== Population ===
At the time of the 2006 National Census, the village's population was 2,933 in 703 households. The following census in 2011 counted 3,138 people in 875 households. The 2016 census measured the population of the village as 2,965 people in 902 households.
