= Haqnabad =

Village in Razavi Khorasan province, Iran

Haqnabad Persian: حقن اباد
- Village
- Location within Iran
- Coordinates: 35°02′36″N 59°21′01″E
- Country: Iran
- Province: Razavi Khorasan
- County: Roshtkhar
- District: Jangal
- Rural District: Shabeh

Population (2016)
  - Total: 562
- Time zone: UTC+3:30 (IRST)

Haqnabad (Persian: حقن اباد) (Note: Also romanized as Ḩaqnābād; also known as Haqqābād) is a village in Shabeh Rural District of Jangal District in Roshtkhar County, Razavi Khorasan province, Iran.

== Demographics ==
=== Population ===
At the time of the 2006 National Census, the village's population was 646 in 146 households. The following census in 2011 counted 630 people in 172 households. The 2016 census measured the population of the village as 562 people in 152 households, the most populous in its rural district.
