= Saadatabad, Roshtkhar =

Village in Razavi Khorasan province, Iran

Saadatabad Persian: سعادت اباد
- Village
- Location within Iran
- Coordinates: 34°54′30″N 59°47′09″E
- Country: Iran
- Province: Razavi Khorasan
- County: Roshtkhar
- District: Central
- Rural District: Roshtkhar

Population (2016)
  - Total: 2,308
- Time zone: UTC+3:30 (IRST)

Saadatabad (Persian: سعادت اباد) (Note: Also romanized as Saʿādatābād) is a village in Roshtkhar Rural District of the Central District in Roshtkhar County, Razavi Khorasan province, Iran.

== Demographics ==
=== Population ===
At the time of the 2006 National Census, the village's population was 2,050 in 472 households. The following census in 2011 counted 2,212 people in 623 households. The 2016 census measured the population of the village as 2,308 people in 672 households.
