= Malekabad, Roshtkhar =

Village in Razavi Khorasan province, Iran

Malekabad Persian: ملك اباد
- Village
- Location within Iran
- Coordinates: 35°08′26″N 59°23′35″E
- Country: Iran
- Province: Razavi Khorasan
- County: Roshtkhar
- District: Central
- Rural District: Astaneh

Population (2016)
  - Total: 1,569
- Time zone: UTC+3:30 (IRST)

Malekabad (Persian: ملك اباد) (Note: Also romanized as Malekābād; also known as Malekābād-e Āstāneh) is a village in Astaneh Rural District of the Central District in Roshtkhar County, Razavi Khorasan province, Iran.

== Demographics ==
=== Population ===
At the time of the 2006 National Census, the village's population was 1,399 in 321 households. The following census in 2011 counted 1,613 people in 403 households. The 2016 census measured the population of the village as 1,569 people in 458 households.
