= Barakuh, Roshtkhar =

Village in Razavi Khorasan province, Iran

Barakuh Persian: براكوه
- Village
- Location within Iran
- Coordinates: 35°03′55″N 59°39′10″E
- Country: Iran
- Province: Razavi Khorasan
- County: Roshtkhar
- District: Central
- Rural District: Roshtkhar

Population (2016)
  - Total: 918
- Time zone: UTC+3:30 (IRST)

Barakuh (Persian: براكوه) (Note: Also romanized as Barākūh) is a village in Roshtkhar Rural District of the Central District in Roshtkhar County, Razavi Khorasan province, Iran.

== Demographics ==
=== Population ===
At the time of the 2006 National Census, the village's population was 872 in 221 households. The following census in 2011 counted 966 people in 265 households. The 2016 census measured the population of the village as 918 people in 273 households.
