= Deh-e Bad =

Deh-e Bad or Deh Bad (Persian: ده باد) may refer to:

- Deh-e Bad-e Olya
- Deh-e Bad-e Sofla
