= Fathabad, Roshtkhar =

Village in Razavi Khorasan province, Iran

Fathabad Persian: فتح اباد
- Village
- Location within Iran
- Coordinates: 35°03′03″N 59°41′13″E
- Country: Iran
- Province: Razavi Khorasan
- County: Roshtkhar
- District: Central
- Rural District: Roshtkhar

Population (2016)
  - Total: 2,823
- Time zone: UTC+3:30 (IRST)

Fathabad (Persian: فتح اباد) (Note: Also romanized as Fatḩābād) is a village in Roshtkhar Rural District of the Central District in Roshtkhar County, Razavi Khorasan province, Iran.

== Demographics ==
=== Population ===
At the time of the 2006 National Census, the village's population was 2,698 in 682 households. The following census in 2011 counted 3,195 people in 897 households. The 2016 census measured the population of the village as 2,823 people in 893 households. It was the most populous village in its rural district.
