= Fazel Mand =

Village in Razavi Khorasan province, Iran

Fazel Mand Persian: فاضل مند
- Village
- Location within Iran
- Coordinates: 34°52′59″N 59°21′41″E
- Country: Iran
- Province: Razavi Khorasan
- County: Roshtkhar
- District: Jangal
- Rural District: Shabeh

Population (2016)
  - Total: 487
- Time zone: UTC+3:30 (IRST)

Fazel Mand (Persian: فاضل مند) (Note: Also romanized as Fāẕel Mand, Fāzel Mand, and Fazlmand; also known as Fāzeh Mand and Fazīmand) is a village in Shabeh Rural District of Jangal District in Roshtkhar County, Razavi Khorasan province, Iran.

== Demographics ==
=== Population ===
At the time of the 2006 National Census, the village's population was 587 in 134 households. The following census in 2011 counted 563 people in 141 households. The 2016 census measured the population of the village as 487 people in 133 households.
