= Alinaqi-ye Olya =

Village in Razavi Khorasan province, Iran

Alinaqi-ye Olya Persian: علي نقي عليا
- Village
- Location within Iran
- Coordinates: 34°32′55″N 59°18′22″E
- Country: Iran
- Province: Razavi Khorasan
- County: Roshtkhar
- District: Jangal
- Rural District: Jangal

Population (2016)
  - Total: 222
- Time zone: UTC+3:30 (IRST)

Alinaqi-ye Olya (Persian: علي نقي عليا) (Note: Also romanized as ‘Alīnaqī-ye ‘Olyā) is a village in Jangal Rural District of Jangal District in Roshtkhar County, Razavi Khorasan province, Iran.

== Demographics ==
=== Population ===
At the time of the 2006 National Census, the village's population was 222 in 42 households. The following census in 2011 counted 218 people in 43 households. The 2016 census measured the population of the village as 222 people in 53 households.
