= Hoseynabad-e Roshtkhar =

Village in Razavi Khorasan province, Iran

Hoseynabad-e Roshtkhar Persian: حسين اباد رشتخوار
- Village
- Location within Iran
- Coordinates: 34°57′18″N 59°39′20″E
- Country: Iran
- Province: Razavi Khorasan
- County: Roshtkhar
- District: Central
- Rural District: Roshtkhar

Population (2016)
  - Total: 633
- Time zone: UTC+3:30 (IRST)

Hoseynabad-e Roshtkhar (Persian: حسين اباد رشتخوار) (Note: Also romanized as Ḩoseynābād-e Rashtkhvār; also known as Ḩoseynābād and Husainābād) is a village in, and the capital of, Roshtkhar Rural District in the Central District of Roshtkhar County, Razavi Khorasan province, Iran.

== Demographics ==
=== Population ===
At the time of the 2006 National Census, the village's population was 662 in 151 households. The following census in 2011 counted 738 people in 175 households. The 2016 census measured the population of the village as 633 people in 194 households.
