= Band-e Ozbak =

Village in Razavi Khorasan province, Iran

Band-e Ozbak Persian: بندازبك
- Village
- Location within Iran
- Coordinates: 34°40′41″N 59°06′44″E
- Country: Iran
- Province: Razavi Khorasan
- County: Roshtkhar
- District: Jangal
- Rural District: Jangal

Population (2016)
  - Total: 689
- Time zone: UTC+3:30 (IRST)

Band-e Ozbak (Persian: بندازبك) (Note: Also known as Bandar Ozbak and Bandārīk) is a village in Jangal Rural District of Jangal District in Roshtkhar County, Razavi Khorasan province, Iran.

== Demographics ==
=== Population ===
At the time of the 2006 National Census, the village's population was 584 in 112 households. The following census in 2011 counted 627 people in 140 households. The 2016 census measured the population of the village as 689 people in 201 households.
