= Bazeh-ye Asheqan =

Bazeh-ye Asheqan بازه عاشقان
- Village
- Location within Iran
- Coordinates: 34°58′04″N 59°33′10″E
- Country: Iran
- Province: Razavi Khorasan
- County: Roshtkhar
- Bakhsh: Central
- Rural District: Roshtkhar

Population (2006)
  - Total: 369
- Time zone: UTC+3:30 (IRST)
  - Summer (DST): UTC+4:30 (IRDT)

Bazeh-ye Asheqan (Persian: بازه عاشقان, also Romanized as Bāzeh-ye ‘Āsheqān and Bāzeh ‘Āsheqān; also known as Basqū, ‘Āsheqān, Bāshekūn, Bāsheqūn, and Bāshqūn) is a village in Roshtkhar Rural District, in the Central District of Roshtkhar County, Razavi Khorasan Province, Iran. At the 2006 census, its population was 369, in 82 families.

== See also ==
- List of cities, towns and villages in Razavi Khorasan Province
