= Mohammadabad, Roshtkhar =

Village in Razavi Khorasan province, Iran

Mohammadabad Persian: محمداباد
- Village
- Location within Iran
- Coordinates: 35°06′17″N 59°20′22″E
- Country: Iran
- Province: Razavi Khorasan
- County: Roshtkhar
- District: Central
- Rural District: Astaneh

Population (2016)
  - Total: 4,548
- Time zone: UTC+3:30 (IRST)

Mohammadabad (Persian: محمداباد) (Note: Also romanized as Moḩammadābād) is a village in Astaneh Rural District of the Central District in Roshtkhar County, Razavi Khorasan province, Iran.

== Demographics ==
=== Population ===
At the time of the 2006 National Census, the village's population was 3,943 in 856 households. The following census in 2011 counted 4,309 people in 1,163 households. The 2016 census measured the population of the village as 4,548 people in 1,319 households, the most populous in its rural district.
