= Shabeh (disambiguation) =

Shabeh is a village in, and the capital of, Shabeh Rural District of Jangal District, Roshtkhar County, Razavi Khorasan province, Iran.

Shabeh may also refer to:

- Shabeh (torture), Israeli combined torture method
- Shabeh Rural District, administrative division, Iran
- Shabeh, Markazi, village in Markazi province, Iran
