= Sangun =

Sangun or Senagun (Persian: سنگون) may refer to:

- Senagun, Kohgiluyeh and Boyer-Ahmad
- Sangun, Razavi Khorasan
- Sangun, Sistan and Baluchestan
