= Howz-e Karam =

Village in Razavi Khorasan province, Iran

Howz-e Karam Persian: حوض كرم
- Village
- Location within Iran
- Coordinates: 34°36′29″N 59°22′41″E
- Country: Iran
- Province: Razavi Khorasan
- County: Roshtkhar
- District: Jangal
- Rural District: Jangal

Population (2016)
  - Total: 217
- Time zone: UTC+3:30 (IRST)

Howz-e Karam (Persian: حوض كرم) (Note: Also romanized as Ḩowẕ-e Karam) is a village in Jangal Rural District of Jangal District in Roshtkhar County, Razavi Khorasan province, Iran.

== Demographics ==
=== Population ===
At the time of the 2006 National Census, the village's population was 198 in 43 households. The following census in 2011 counted 86 people in 18 households. The 2016 census measured the population of the village as 217 people in 60 households.
