= Zarghari =

Village in Razavi Khorasan province, Iran

Zarghari Persian: زرغري
- Village
- Location within Iran
- Coordinates: 34°54′58″N 59°43′15″E
- Country: Iran
- Province: Razavi Khorasan
- County: Roshtkhar
- District: Central
- Rural District: Roshtkhar

Population (2016)
  - Total: 636
- Time zone: UTC+3:30 (IRST)

Zarghari (Persian: زرغري) (Note: Formerly known as Zarazi (زرعزي); also known as Zari Zi and Zariʿ Zī) is a village in Roshtkhar Rural District of the Central District in Roshtkhar County, Razavi Khorasan province, Iran.

== Demographics ==
=== Population ===
At the time of the 2006 National Census, the village's population, as Zarazi, was 679 in 154 households. The following census in 2011 counted 650 people in 185 households. The 2016 census measured the population of the village as 636 people in 199 households, by which time it was listed as Zarghari.
