= Jannatabad-e Jangal =

Village in Razavi Khorasan province, Iran

Jannatabad-e Jangal Persian: جنت‌آباد جنگل
- Village
- Location within Iran
- Coordinates: 34°44′21″N 59°17′46″E
- Country: Iran
- Province: Razavi Khorasan
- County: Roshtkhar
- District: Jangal
- Rural District: Jangal

Population (2016)
  - Total: 2,659
- Time zone: UTC+3:30 (IRST)

Jannatabad-e Jangal (Persian: جنت‌آباد جنگل) (Note: Also romanized as Jannatābād-e Jangal; also known as Jannatābād, Jannatābād-e Shīr Moḩammad, and Shir Moḩammad) is a village in Jangal Rural District of Jangal District in Roshtkhar County, Razavi Khorasan province, Iran.

== Demographics ==
=== Population ===
At the time of the 2006 National Census, the village's population was 2,504 in 563 households. The following census in 2011 counted 2,613 people in 681 households. The 2016 census measured the population of the village as 2,659 people in 712 households, the most populous in its rural district.
