= Ebrahimabad, Roshtkhar =

Village in Razavi Khorasan province, Iran

Ebrahimabad Persian: ابراهيم اباد
- Village
- Location within Iran
- Coordinates: 34°56′35″N 59°20′25″E
- Country: Iran
- Province: Razavi Khorasan
- County: Roshtkhar
- District: Jangal
- Rural District: Shabeh

Population (2016)
  - Total: 130
- Time zone: UTC+3:30 (IRST)

Ebrahimabad (Persian: ابراهيم اباد) (Note: Also romanized as Ebrāhīmābād) is a village in Shabeh Rural District of Jangal District in Roshtkhar County, Razavi Khorasan province, Iran.

== Demographics ==
=== Population ===
At the time of the 2006 National Census, the village's population was 204 in 40 households. The following census in 2011 counted 146 people in 35 households. The 2016 census measured the population of the village as 130 people in 37 households.
