= Kazemabad, Roshtkhar =

Village in Razavi Khorasan province, Iran

Kazemabad Persian: كاظم اباد
- Village
- Location within Iran
- Coordinates: 35°01′25″N 59°27′49″E
- Country: Iran
- Province: Razavi Khorasan
- County: Roshtkhar
- District: Central
- Rural District: Astaneh

Population (2016)
  - Total: 156
- Time zone: UTC+3:30 (IRST)

Kazemabad (Persian: كاظم اباد) (Note: Also romanized as Kāz̧emābād) is a village in Astaneh Rural District of the Central District in Roshtkhar County, Razavi Khorasan province, Iran.

== Demographics ==
=== Population ===
At the time of the 2006 National Census, the village's population was 204 in 49 households. The following census in 2011 counted 182 people in 50 households. The 2016 census measured the population of the village as 156 people in 47 households.
