= Qaderabad, Roshtkhar =

Village in Razavi Khorasan province, Iran

Qaderabad Persian: قادراباد
- Village
- Location within Iran
- Coordinates: 34°56′35″N 59°35′13″E
- Country: Iran
- Province: Razavi Khorasan
- County: Roshtkhar
- District: Central
- Rural District: Roshtkhar

Population (2016)
  - Total: 623
- Time zone: UTC+3:30 (IRST)

Qaderabad (Persian: قادراباد) (Note: Also romanized as Qāderābād; also known as Qadrābād (قدر اباد)) is a village in Roshtkhar Rural District of the Central District in Roshtkhar County, Razavi Khorasan province, Iran.

== Demographics ==
=== Population ===
At the time of the 2006 National Census, the village's population was 612 in 122 households. The following census in 2011 counted 638 people in 156 households. The 2016 census measured the population of the village as 623 people in 168 households.
