= Amidi-ye Kohneh =

Village in Razavi Khorasan province, Iran

Amidi-ye Kohneh Persian: عميدئ كهنه
- Village
- Location within Iran
- Country: Iran
- Province: Razavi Khorasan
- County: Roshtkhar
- District: Central
- Rural District: Astaneh

Population (2016)
  - Total: 750
- Time zone: UTC+3:30 (IRST)

Amidi-ye Kohneh (Persian: عميدئ كهنه) (Note: Also romanized as ‘Amīdī-ye Kohneh; also known as ‘Amdī-ye Kohneh and ‘Amīdī) is a village in Astaneh Rural District of the Central District in Roshtkhar County, Razavi Khorasan province, Iran.

== Demographics ==
=== Population ===
At the time of the 2006 National Census, the village's population was 646 in 158 households. The following census in 2011 counted 718 people in 205 households. The 2016 census measured the population of the village as 750 people in 222 households.
