= Moharramabad =

Village in Razavi Khorasan province, Iran

Moharramabad Persian: محرم اباد
- Village
- Location within Iran
- Coordinates: 34°53′14″N 59°20′57″E
- Country: Iran
- Province: Razavi Khorasan
- County: Roshtkhar
- District: Jangal
- Rural District: Shabeh

Population (2016)
  - Total: 62
- Time zone: UTC+3:30 (IRST)

Moharramabad (Persian: محرم اباد) (Note: Also romanized as Moḩarramābād) is a village in Shabeh Rural District of Jangal District in Roshtkhar County, Razavi Khorasan province, Iran.

== Demographics ==
=== Population ===
At the time of the 2006 National Census, the village's population was 146 in 44 households. The following census in 2011 counted 88 people in 29 households. The 2016 census measured the population of the village as 62 people in 22 households.
