= Ab Niyeh-ye Sofla =

Ab Niyeh-ye Sofla ابنيه سفلي
- Village
- Location within Iran
- Coordinates: 35°02′49″N 59°34′43″E
- Country: Iran
- Province: Razavi Khorasan
- County: Roshtkhar
- Bakhsh: Central
- Rural District: Roshtkhar

Population (2006)
  - Total: 282
- Time zone: UTC+3:30 (IRST)
  - Summer (DST): UTC+4:30 (IRDT)

Ab Niyeh-ye Sofla (Persian: ابنيه سفلي, also Romanized as Āb Nīyeh-ye Soflá; also known as Āb Nīyeh and Āvīeh) is a village in Roshtkhar Rural District, in the Central District of Roshtkhar County, Razavi Khorasan province, Iran. Its population was 282 at the 2006 census, with 64 families.

== See also ==
- List of cities, towns and villages in Razavi Khorasan province
