= Chah-e Shur, Roshtkhar =

Village in Razavi Khorasan province, Iran

Chah-e Shur Persian: چاه شور
- Village
- Location within Iran
- Coordinates: 34°36′09″N 59°10′38″E
- Country: Iran
- Province: Razavi Khorasan
- County: Roshtkhar
- District: Jangal
- Rural District: Jangal

Population (2016)
  - Total: 493
- Time zone: UTC+3:30 (IRST)

Chah-e Shur (Persian: چاه شور) (Note: Also romanized as Chāh-e Shūr) is a village in Jangal Rural District of Jangal District in Roshtkhar County, Razavi Khorasan province, Iran.

== Demographics ==
=== Population ===
At the time of the 2006 National Census, the village's population was 501 in 106 households. The following census in 2011 counted 542 people in 129 households. The 2016 census measured the population of the village as 493 people in 131 households.
