= Ahmadabad, Roshtkhar =

Village in Razavi Khorasan province, Iran

Ahmadabad Persian: احمداباد
- Village
- Location within Iran
- Coordinates: 35°08′35″N 59°18′27″E
- Country: Iran
- Province: Razavi Khorasan
- County: Roshtkhar
- District: Central
- Rural District: Astaneh

Population (2016)
  - Total: 2,929
- Time zone: UTC+3:30 (IRST)

Ahmadabad (Persian: احمداباد) (Note: Also romanized as Aḩmadābād; also known as Aḩmadābād-e Āstāneh and Hendābād (هند اباد)) is a village in Astaneh Rural District of the Central District in Roshtkhar County, Razavi Khorasan province, Iran.

== Demographics ==
=== Population ===
At the time of the 2006 National Census, the village's population was 2,774 in 691 households. The following census in 2011 counted 2,883 people in 814 households. The 2016 census measured the population of the village as 2,929 people in 863 households.
