= Alinaqi-ye Sofla =

Village in Razavi Khorasan province, Iran

Alinaqi-ye Sofla Persian: علي نقي سفلی
- Village
- Location within Iran
- Coordinates: 34°32′35″N 59°17′22″E
- Country: Iran
- Province: Razavi Khorasan
- County: Roshtkhar
- District: Jangal
- Rural District: Jangal

Population (2016)
  - Total: 123
- Time zone: UTC+3:30 (IRST)

Alinaqi-ye Sofla (Persian: علي نقي سفلی) (Note: Also romanized as ‘Alīnaqī-ye Soflá) is a village in Jangal Rural District of Jangal District in Roshtkhar County, Razavi Khorasan province, Iran.

== Demographics ==
=== Population ===
At the time of the 2006 National Census, the village's population was 133 in 27 households. The following census in 2011 counted 139 people in 33 households. The 2016 census measured the population of the village as 123 people in 40 households.
