= Aminabad, Jangal =

Village in Razavi Khorasan province, Iran

Aminabad Persian: امين آباد
- Village
- Location within Iran
- Coordinates: 35°01′51″N 59°22′41″E
- Country: Iran
- Province: Razavi Khorasan
- County: Roshtkhar
- District: Jangal
- Rural District: Shabeh

Population (2016)
  - Total: 197
- Time zone: UTC+3:30 (IRST)

Aminabad (Persian: امين آباد) (Note: Also romanized as Amīnābād; also known as Amīnābād-e Sangān) is a village in Shabeh Rural District of Jangal District in Roshtkhar County, Razavi Khorasan province, Iran.

== Demographics ==
=== Population ===
At the time of the 2006 National Census, the village's population was 185 in 47 households. The following census in 2011 counted 191 people in 54 households. The 2016 census measured the population of the village as 197 people in 56 households.
