= Kowdeh, Razavi Khorasan =

Village in Razavi Khorasan province, Iran

Kowdeh Persian: کوده
- Village
- Location within Iran
- Coordinates: 34°38′41″N 59°14′35″E
- Country: Iran
- Province: Razavi Khorasan
- County: Roshtkhar
- District: Jangal
- Rural District: Jangal

Population (2016)
  - Total: 30
- Time zone: UTC+3:30 (IRST)

Kowdeh (Persian: کوده) (Note: Also known as Ābādī) is a village in Jangal Rural District of Jangal District in Roshtkhar County, Razavi Khorasan province, Iran.

== Demographics ==
=== Population ===
At the time of the 2006 National Census, the village's population was 91 in 17 households. The following census in 2011 counted 54 people in 13 households. The 2016 census measured the population of the village as 30 people in six households.
