= Sadabad, Roshtkhar =

Village in Razavi Khorasan province, Iran

Sadabad Persian: سعداباد
- Village
- Location within Iran
- Coordinates: 34°55′18″N 59°21′05″E
- Country: Iran
- Province: Razavi Khorasan
- County: Roshtkhar
- District: Jangal
- Rural District: Shabeh

Population (2016)
  - Total: 150
- Time zone: UTC+3:30 (IRST)

Sadabad (Persian: سعداباد) (Note: Also romanized as Sa‘dābād; also known as Saiyidābād and Seyyedābād) is a village in Shabeh Rural District of Jangal District in Roshtkhar County, Razavi Khorasan province, Iran.

== Demographics ==
=== Population ===
At the time of the 2006 National Census, the village's population was 362 in 99 households. The following census in 2011 counted 243 people in 73 households. The 2016 census measured the population of the village as 150 people in 44 households.
