= Basfar =

Village in Razavi Khorasan province, Iran

Basfar Persian: باسفر
- Village
- Location within Iran
- Coordinates: 35°05′31″N 59°25′10″E
- Country: Iran
- Province: Razavi Khorasan
- County: Roshtkhar
- District: Central
- Rural District: Astaneh

Population (2016)
  - Total: 3,917
- Time zone: UTC+3:30 (IRST)

Basfar (Persian: باسفر) (Note: Also romanized as Ba Safar, Bāsfar, and Bāsfor; also known as Bāsfowr Naşrābād) is a village in, and the capital of, Astaneh Rural District in the Central District of Roshtkhar County, Razavi Khorasan province, Iran.

== Demographics ==
=== Population ===
At the time of the 2006 National Census, the village's population was 3,553 in 872 households. The following census in 2011 counted 3,870 people in 1,064 households. The 2016 census measured the population of the village as 3,917 people in 1,131 households.
