= Chehel Cheshmeh =

Chehel Cheshmeh or Chehel Chashmeh (Persian: چهل چشمه) may refer to:

- Chehel Cheshmeh, Sepidan, Fars Province
- Chehel Cheshmeh, Shiraz, Fars Province
- Chehel Cheshmeh, Isfahan
- Chehel Cheshmeh Rural District, in Kurdistan Province
- Chehel Cheshmeh-ye Gharbi Rural District, in Kurdistan Province
