= Gol Sefid-e Dowlatabad =

Gol Sefid-e Dowlatabad گل سفيددولت اباد
- Village
- Location within Iran
- Coordinates: 32°36′13″N 50°18′50″E
- Country: Iran
- Province: Isfahan
- County: Chadegan
- Bakhsh: Chenarud
- Rural District: Chenarud-e Jonubi

Population (2006)
  - Total: 92
- Time zone: UTC+3:30 (IRST)
  - Summer (DST): UTC+4:30 (IRDT)

Gol Sefid-e Dowlatabad (Persian: گل سفيددولت اباد, also Romanized as Gol Sefīd-e Dowlatābād; also known as Dowlatābād-e Gol Sefīd and Gel-e Sefīd) is a village in Chenarud-e Jonubi Rural District, Chenarud District, Chadegan County, Isfahan Province, Iran. At the 2006 census, its population was 92, in 14 families.
