= Ahangaran, Roshtkhar =

Village in Razavi Khorasan province, Iran

Ahangaran Persian: اهنگران
- Village
- Location within Iran
- Coordinates: 34°34′00″N 59°14′49″E
- Country: Iran
- Province: Razavi Khorasan
- County: Roshtkhar
- District: Jangal
- Rural District: Jangal

Population (2016)
  - Total: 321
- Time zone: UTC+3:30 (IRST)

Ahangaran (Persian: اهنگران) (Note: Also romanized as Āhangarān) is a village in Jangal Rural District of Jangal District in Roshtkhar County, Razavi Khorasan province, Iran.

== Demographics ==
=== Population ===
At the time of the 2006 National Census, the village's population was 339 in 75 households. The following census in 2011 counted 331 people in 79 households. The 2016 census measured the population of the village as 321 people in 84 households.
