= Khudabad (disambiguation) =

Khudabad is a city in Sindh, Pakistan.

Khudabad may also refer to:

- Khudabad railway station, in the city
- Khudabad, Gilgit-Baltistan, a village in Gilgit-Baltistan, Pakistan
- Khudabad, Fars, a village in Fars, Iran
- Khudabad, Razavi Khorasan, a village in Razavi Khorasan, Iran

== See also ==
- Khodaabad (disambiguation)
- Khudabadi script, an Indic script historically used to write the Sindhi language
