= Faramushjan =

Village in Isfahan province, Iran

Faramushjan Persian: فراموشجان
- Village
- Location within Iran
- Coordinates: 32°38′51″N 50°26′08″E
- Country: Iran
- Province: Isfahan
- County: Chadegan
- District: Chenarud
- Rural District: Chenarud-e Shomali

Population (2016)
  - Total: 991
- Time zone: UTC+3:30 (IRST)

Faramushjan (Persian: فراموشجان) (Note: Also romanized as Faramoosh Jan, Faramush Jan, and Farāmūsh Jān) is a village in, and the capital of, Chenarud-e Shomali Rural District in Chenarud District of Chadegan County, Isfahan province, Iran.

== Demographics ==
=== Population ===
At the time of the 2006 National Census, the village's population was 921 in 254 households. The following census in 2011 counted 1,086 people in 257 households. The 2016 census measured the population of the village as 991 people in 285 households, the most populous in its rural district.
