= Parmeh-ye Sofla =

Village in Isfahan province, Iran

Parmeh-ye Sofla Persian: پرمه سفلي
- Village
- Location within Iran
- Coordinates: 32°43′47″N 50°21′00″E
- Country: Iran
- Province: Isfahan
- County: Chadegan
- District: Chenarud
- Rural District: Chenarud-e Shomali

Population (2016)
  - Total: 399
- Time zone: UTC+3:30 (IRST)

Parmeh-ye Sofla (Persian: پرمه سفلي) (Note: Also romanized as Parmeh Sofla and Parmeh-ye Soflá; also known as Parmeh-ye Pā’īn) is a village in Chenarud-e Shomali Rural District of Chenarud District in Chadegan County, Isfahan province, Iran.

== Demographics ==
=== Population ===
At the time of the 2006 National Census, the village's population was 481 in 100 households. The following census in 2011 counted 494 people in 115 households. The 2016 census measured the population of the village as 399 people in 103 households.
