= Rivand, Roshtkhar =

Village in Razavi Khorasan province, Iran

Rivand Persian: ريوند
- Village
- Location within Iran
- Coordinates: 35°01′05″N 59°28′23″E
- Country: Iran
- Province: Razavi Khorasan
- County: Roshtkhar
- District: Central
- Rural District: Astaneh

Population (2016)
  - Total: 146
- Time zone: UTC+3:30 (IRST)

Rivand (Persian: ريوند) (Note: Also romanized as Rīvand) is a village in Astaneh Rural District of the Central District in Roshtkhar County, Razavi Khorasan province, Iran.

== Demographics ==
=== Population ===
At the time of the 2006 National Census, the village's population was 145 in 36 households. The following census in 2011 counted 133 people in 37 households. The 2016 census measured the population of the village as 146 people in 42 households.
