= Shabeh =

Village in Razavi Khorasan province, Iran

Shabeh Persian: شعبه
- Village
- Location within Iran
- Coordinates: 34°56′26″N 59°21′38″E
- Country: Iran
- Province: Razavi Khorasan
- County: Roshtkhar
- District: Jangal
- Rural District: Shabeh

Population (2016)
  - Total: 522
- Time zone: UTC+3:30 (IRST)

Shabeh (Persian: شعبه) (Note: Also romanized as Sha‘beh or Sho‘beh; also known as Shubeh and Sūreh) is a village in, and the capital of, Shabeh Rural District in Jangal District of Roshtkhar County, Razavi Khorasan province, Iran.

== Demographics ==
=== Population ===
At the time of the 2006 National Census, the village's population was 760 in 201 households. The following census in 2011 counted 632 people in 185 households. The 2016 census measured the population of the village as 522 people in 159 households.
