= Afsabad =

Afsabad (Persian: افس آباد) may refer to:

- Afsabad, Khvaf
- Afsabad, Rashtkhvar
