= Hermanak =

Village in Isfahan province, Iran

Hermanak Persian: حرمانك
- Village
- Location within Iran
- Coordinates: 32°36′22″N 50°20′59″E
- Country: Iran
- Province: Isfahan
- County: Chadegan
- District: Chenarud
- Rural District: Chenarud-e Jonubi

Population (2016)
  - Total: 110
- Time zone: UTC+3:30 (IRST)

Hermanak (Persian: حرمانك) (Note: Also romanized as Ḩermānak and Hermānak; also known as Hermānak-e ‘Olyā and Khermānak) is a village in Chenarud-e Jonubi Rural District of Chenarud District in Chadegan County, Isfahan province, Iran.

== Demographics ==
=== Population ===
At the time of the 2006 National Census, the village's population was 216 in 35 households. The following census in 2011 counted 171 people in 46 households. The 2016 census measured the population of the village as 110 people in 33 households.
