= Rivand =

Rivand (Persian: ريوند) may refer to:

- Rivand, Davarzan
- Rivand, Rashtkhvar
- Rivand Rural District
