= Esfahanak-e Sofla =

Esfahanak-e Sofla اصفهانك سفلي
- Village
- Location within Iran
- Coordinates: 32°38′16″N 50°21′54″E
- Country: Iran
- Province: Isfahan
- County: Chadegan
- Bakhsh: Chenarud
- Rural District: Chenarud-e Shomali

Population (2006)
  - Total: 104
- Time zone: UTC+3:30 (IRST)
  - Summer (DST): UTC+4:30 (IRDT)

Esfahanak-e Sofla (Persian: اصفهانك سفلي, also Romanized as Eşfahānak-e Soflá and Eşfahānak Soflá; also known as Esfahanak and Eşfahānak-e Pā’īn) is a village in Chenarud-e Shomali Rural District, Chenarud District, Chadegan County, Isfahan Province, Iran. At the 2006 census, its population was 104, in 21 families.
