= Dowlatabad, Chadegan =

Village in Isfahan province, Iran

Dowlatabad Persian: دولت اباد
- Village
- Location within Iran
- Coordinates: 32°35′10″N 50°19′12″E
- Country: Iran
- Province: Isfahan
- County: Chadegan
- District: Chenarud
- Rural District: Chenarud-e Jonubi

Population (2016)
  - Total: 101
- Time zone: UTC+3:30 (IRST)

Dowlatabad (Persian: دولت اباد) (Note: Also romanized as Dowlatābād; also known as Daulatābād, Dowlatābād-e Karīm (دولت آباد کريم), and Dowlatābād-e ‘Olyā) is a village in Chenarud-e Jonubi Rural District of Chenarud District in Chadegan County, Isfahan province, Iran.

== Demographics ==
=== Population ===
At the time of the 2006 National Census, the village's population was 100 in 16 households. The following census in 2011 counted 90 people in 24 households. The 2016 census measured the population of the village as 101 people in 29 households.
