= Esfahanak-e Moshai =

Esfahanak-e Moshai اصفهانك مشاعي
- Village
- Location within Iran
- Coordinates: 32°38′22″N 50°22′39″E
- Country: Iran
- Province: Isfahan
- County: Chadegan
- Bakhsh: Chenarud
- Rural District: Chenarud-e Shomali

Population (2006)
  - Total: 155
- Time zone: UTC+3:30 (IRST)
  - Summer (DST): UTC+4:30 (IRDT)

Esfahanak-e Moshai (Persian: اصفهانك مشاعي, also Romanized as Eşfahānak-e Moshā‘ī and Eşfahānak Mashā‘ī; also known as Esfahanak) is a village in Chenarud-e Shomali Rural District, Chenarud District, Chadegan County, Isfahan Province, Iran. At the 2006 census, its population was 155, in 29 families.
