= Aliabad, Chenarud-e Jonubi =

Village in Isfahan province, Iran

Aliabad Persian: علي اباد
- Village
- Location within Iran
- Coordinates: 32°33′43″N 50°22′11″E
- Country: Iran
- Province: Isfahan
- County: Chadegan
- District: Chenarud
- Rural District: Chenarud-e Jonubi

Population (2016)
  - Total: 97
- Time zone: UTC+3:30 (IRST)

Aliabad (Persian: علی‌آباد) (Note: Also romanized as ‘Alīābād; formerly known as Khorasanak-e Sofla (خرسانک سفلي)) is a village in Chenarud-e Jonubi Rural District of Chenarud District in Chadegan County, Isfahan province, Iran.

== Demographics ==
=== Population ===
At the time of the 2006 National Census, the village's population was 92 in 21 households. The following census in 2011 counted 92 people in 25 households. The 2016 census measured the population of the village as 97 people in 23 households.
