= Parzegan =

Parzegan (Persian: پرزگان), also rendered as Parzehgan, may refer to:

- Parzegan-e Kharraj
- Parzegan-e Sofla
