= Esfahanak-e Abdol =

Esfahanak-e Abdol اصفهانك عبدل
- Village
- Location within Iran
- Coordinates: 32°38′55″N 50°20′15″E
- Country: Iran
- Province: Isfahan
- County: Chadegan
- Bakhsh: Chenarud
- Rural District: Chenarud-e Shomali

Population (2006)
  - Total: 28
- Time zone: UTC+3:30 (IRST)
  - Summer (DST): UTC+4:30 (IRDT)

Esfahanak-e Abdol (Persian: اصفهانك عبدل, also Romanized as Eşfahānak-e ‘Abdol) is a village in Chenarud-e Shomali Rural District, Chenarud District, Chadegan County, Isfahan Province, Iran. At the 2006 census, its population was 28, in 4 families.
