= Chehel Cheshmeh, Isfahan =

Chehel Cheshmeh چهل چشمه
- Village
- Location within Iran
- Coordinates: 32°36′54″N 50°25′05″E
- Country: Iran
- Province: Isfahan
- County: Chadegan
- Bakhsh: Chenarud
- Rural District: Chenarud-e Shomali

Population (2006)
  - Total: 135
- Time zone: UTC+3:30 (IRST)
  - Summer (DST): UTC+4:30 (IRDT)

Chehel Cheshmeh (Persian: چهل چشمه, also Romanized as Chehel Chashmeh; also known as Chehīl Chashmeh) is a village in Chenarud-e Shomali Rural District, Chenarud District, Chadegan County, Isfahan Province, Iran. At the 2006 census, its population was 135, in 28 families.
