= Esfahanak-e Olya =

Esfahanak-e Olya اصفهانك عليا
- Village
- Location within Iran
- Coordinates: 32°38′20″N 50°20′40″E
- Country: Iran
- Province: Isfahan
- County: Chadegan
- Bakhsh: Chenarud
- Rural District: Chenarud-e Shomali

Population (2006)
  - Total: 135
- Time zone: UTC+3:30 (IRST)
  - Summer (DST): UTC+4:30 (IRDT)

Esfahanak-e Olya (Persian: اصفهانك عليا, also Romanized as Eşfahānak-e ‘Olyā and Eşfahānak ‘Olyā; also known as Esfahanak and Eşfahānak-e Bālā) is a village in Chenarud-e Shomali Rural District, Chenarud District, Chadegan County, Isfahan Province, Iran. At the 2006 census, its population was 135, in 27 families.
