= Do Chahi, Roshtkhar =

Village in Razavi Khorasan province, Iran

Do Chahi Persian: دوچاهي
- Village
- Location within Iran
- Coordinates: 34°33′35″N 59°25′17″E
- Country: Iran
- Province: Razavi Khorasan
- County: Roshtkhar
- District: Jangal
- Rural District: Jangal

Population (2016)
  - Total: 338
- Time zone: UTC+3:30 (IRST)

Do Chahi (Persian: دوچاهي) (Note: Also romanized as Do Chāhī) is a village in Jangal Rural District of Jangal District in Roshtkhar County, Razavi Khorasan province, Iran.

== Demographics ==
=== Population ===
At the time of the 2006 National Census, the village's population was 296 in 56 households. The following census in 2011 counted 304 people in 66 households. The 2016 census measured the population of the village as 338 people in 83 households.
