= Ab Niyeh =

Ab Niyeh (Persian: آب نیه) may refer to:

- Ab Neyeh
- Ab Niyeh-ye Sofla
