= Battle of Jalalabad =

Battle of Jalalabad or Siege of Jalalabad may refer to:

- At Jalalabad, Afghanistan
  - Battle of Jalalabad (1842), a battle in the First Anglo-Afghan War
  - Siege of Jalalabad (1928–1929), a siege in the 1928–1929 Afghan Civil War
  - Battle of Jalalabad (1989), a battle in the 1989–1992 Afghan Civil War
- Siege of Jalalabad (1710), a siege in the Mughal-Sikh Wars at Jalalabad, Shamli in India

== See also ==
- Jalalabad (disambiguation)
