= Do Chahi-ye Bala =

Village in Razavi Khorasan province, Iran

Do Chahi-ye Bala Persian: دوچاهي بالا
- Village
- Location within Iran
- Coordinates: 34°33′47″N 59°24′57″E
- Country: Iran
- Province: Razavi Khorasan
- County: Roshtkhar
- District: Jangal
- Rural District: Jangal

Population (2016)
  - Total: 219
- Time zone: UTC+3:30 (IRST)

Do Chahi-ye Bala (Persian: دوچاهي بالا) (Note: Also romanized as Do Chāhī-ye Bālā) is a village in Jangal Rural District of Jangal District in Roshtkhar County, Razavi Khorasan province, Iran.

== Demographics ==
=== Population ===
At the time of the 2006 National Census, the village's population was 198 in 39 households. The following census in 2011 counted 212 people in 50 households. The 2016 census measured the population of the village as 219 people in 53 households.
