= Varbad =

Village in Isfahan province, Iran

Varbad Persian: ورباد
- Village
- Location within Iran
- Coordinates: 32°37′20″N 50°23′17″E
- Country: Iran
- Province: Isfahan
- County: Chadegan
- District: Chenarud
- Rural District: Chenarud-e Shomali

Population (2016)
  - Total: 180
- Time zone: UTC+3:30 (IRST)

Varbad (Persian: ورباد) (Note: Also romanized as Varbād; also known as Varbād-e Bālā, Varbad-e Olya, and Varbād-e ‘Olyā) is a village in Chenarud-e Shomali Rural District of Chenarud District in Chadegan County, Isfahan province, Iran.

== Demographics ==
=== Population ===
At the time of the 2006 National Census, the village's population was 163 in 34 households. The following census in 2011 counted 186 people in 40 households. The 2016 census measured the population of the village as 180 people in 47 households.
