= Sangan-e Bala Khaf =

Village in Razavi Khorasan province, Iran

Sangan-e Bala Khaf Persian: سنگان بالاخواف
- Village
- Location within Iran
- Coordinates: 35°06′55″N 59°26′12″E
- Country: Iran
- Province: Razavi Khorasan
- County: Roshtkhar
- District: Central
- Rural District: Astaneh

Population (2016)
  - Total: 2,177
- Time zone: UTC+3:30 (IRST)

Sangan-e Bala Khvaf (Persian: سنگان بالاخواف) (Note: Also romanized as Sangān-e Bālā Khvāf; also known as Sangān, Sangūn, and Sāngūn-e Bālā) is a village in Astaneh Rural District of the Central District in Roshtkhar County, Razavi Khorasan province, Iran.

== Demographics ==
=== Population ===
At the time of the 2006 National Census, the village's population was 2,062 in 556 households. The following census in 2011 counted 2,180 people in 656 households. The 2016 census measured the population of the village as 2,177 people in 673 households.
