= Parmeh-ye Olya =

Village in Isfahan province, Iran

Parmeh-ye Olya Persian: پرمه عليا
- Village
- Location within Iran
- Coordinates: 32°44′12″N 50°20′07″E
- Country: Iran
- Province: Isfahan
- County: Chadegan
- District: Chenarud
- Rural District: Chenarud-e Shomali

Population (2016)
  - Total: 112
- Time zone: UTC+3:30 (IRST)

Parmeh-ye Olya (Persian: پرمه عليا) (Note: Also romanized as Parmeh ‘Olyā and Parmeh-ye ‘Olyā; also known as Parmeh-ye Bālā) is a village in Chenarud-e Shomali Rural District of Chenarud District in Chadegan County, Isfahan province, Iran.

== Demographics ==
=== Population ===
At the time of the 2006 National Census, the village's population was 155 in 29 households. The following census in 2011 counted 92 people in 21 households. The 2016 census measured the population of the village as 112 people in 32 households.
