= Parzegan-e Kharraj =

Parzegan-e Kharraj (Persian: پرزگان خراج, also Romanized as Parzegān-e Kharrāj; also known as Parzegān-e Harrāj and Parzehgān-e Kharāj) is a village in Chenarud-e Shomali Rural District, Chenarud District, Chadegan County, Isfahan Province, Iran. At the 2006 census, its population was 171, in 36 families.
