= Kalijeh =

Kalijeh (Persian: كليجه) may refer to:

- Kalijeh, Chadegan, Isfahan Province
- Kalijeh, Semirom, Isfahan Province
