= Darkabad =

Darkabad or Darakabad (Persian: درك اباد) may refer to:

- Darkabad, Chaharmahal and Bakhtiari
- Darakabad, Isfahan
