= Esfahanak-e Saki =

Esfahanak-e Saki اصفهانك ساكي
- Village
- Location within Iran
- Coordinates: 32°39′02″N 50°20′49″E
- Country: Iran
- Province: Isfahan
- County: Chadegan
- Bakhsh: Chenarud
- Rural District: Chenarud-e Shomali

Population (2006)
  - Total: 136
- Time zone: UTC+3:30 (IRST)
  - Summer (DST): UTC+4:30 (IRDT)

Esfahanak-e Saki (Persian: اصفهانك ساكي, also Romanized as Eşfahānak-e Sākī) is a village in Chenarud-e Shomali Rural District, Chenarud District, Chadegan County, Isfahan Province, Iran. At the 2006 census, its population was 136, in 25 families.
