= Khodaabad, Razavi Khorasan =

Khodaabad خدااباد
- Village
- Location within Iran
- Coordinates: 35°00′10″N 59°35′29″E
- Country: Iran
- Province: Razavi Khorasan
- County: Roshtkhar
- Bakhsh: Central
- Rural District: Roshtkhar

Population (2006)
  - Total: 174
- Time zone: UTC+3:30 (IRST)
  - Summer (DST): UTC+4:30 (IRDT)

Khodaabad (Persian: خدااباد, also Romanized as Khodāābād; also known as Khūdābād) is a village in Roshtkhar Rural District, in the Central District of Roshtkhar County, Razavi Khorasan Province, Iran. At the 2006 census, its population was 174, in 36 families.
