= Absabad =

Village in Razavi Khorasan province, Iran

Absabad Persian: عبس اباد
- Village
- Location within Iran
- Coordinates: 34°58′42″N 59°35′12″E
- Country: Iran
- Province: Razavi Khorasan
- County: Roshtkhar
- District: Central
- Rural District: Roshtkhar

Population (2016)
  - Total: 634
- Time zone: UTC+3:30 (IRST)

Absabad (Persian: عبس اباد) (Note: Also romanized as ‘Absābād; also known as Afsābād) is a village in Roshtkhar Rural District of the Central District in Roshtkhar County, Razavi Khorasan province, Iran.

== Demographics ==
=== Population ===
At the time of the 2006 National Census, the village's population was 649 in 171 households. The following census in 2011 counted 689 people in 205 households. The 2016 census measured the population of the village as 634 people in 210 households.
