= Cheshmandegan-e Sofla =

Village in Isfahan province, Iran

Cheshmandegan-e Sofla Persian: چشمندگان سفلي
- Village
- Location within Iran
- Coordinates: 32°42′21″N 50°20′00″E
- Country: Iran
- Province: Isfahan
- County: Chadegan
- District: Chenarud
- Rural District: Chenarud-e Shomali

Population (2016)
  - Total: 151
- Time zone: UTC+3:30 (IRST)

Cheshmandegan-e Sofla (Persian: چشمندگان سفلي) (Note: Also romanized as Cheshmandegān-e Soflá) is a village in Chenarud-e Shomali Rural District of Chenarud District in Chadegan County, Isfahan province, Iran.

== Demographics ==
=== Population ===
At the time of the 2006 National Census, the village's population was 250 in 49 households. The following census in 2011 counted 206 people in 47 households. The 2016 census measured the population of the village as 151 people in 38 households.
