= Cheshmandegan-e Olya =

Village in Isfahan province, Iran

Cheshmandegan-e Olya Persian: چشمندگان عليا
- Village
- Location within Iran
- Coordinates: 32°42′00″N 50°19′01″E
- Country: Iran
- Province: Isfahan
- County: Chadegan
- District: Chenarud
- Rural District: Chenarud-e Shomali

Population (2016)
  - Total: 43
- Time zone: UTC+3:30 (IRST)

Cheshmandegan-e Olya (Persian: چشمندگان عليا) (Note: Also romanized as Cheshmandegān-e ‘Olyā; also known as Cheshm Andegān and Cheshmehgān) is a village in Chenarud-e Shomali Rural District of Chenarud District in Chadegan County, Isfahan province, Iran.

== Demographics ==
=== Population ===
At the time of the 2006 National Census, the village's population was 105 in 20 households. The following census in 2011 counted 79 people in 16 households. The 2016 census measured the population of the village as 43 people in 12 households.
