= Astaneh Rural District (Roshtkhar County) =

Rural district in Razavi Khorasan province, Iran

Astaneh Rural District Persian: دهستان آستانه
- Rural District
- Location within Iran
- Coordinates: 35°04′N 59°26′E
- Country: Iran
- Province: Razavi Khorasan
- County: Roshtkhar
- District: Central
- Established: 1987
- Capital: Basfar

Population (2016)
  - Total: 22,393
- Time zone: UTC+3:30 (IRST)

Astaneh Rural District (Persian: دهستان آستانه) is in the Central District of Roshtkhar County, Razavi Khorasan province, Iran. Its capital is the village of Basfar.

== Demographics ==
=== Population ===
At the time of the 2006 National Census, the rural district's population was 20,962 in 5,067 households. There were 22,445 inhabitants in 6,241 households at the following census of 2011. The 2016 census measured the population of the rural district as 22,393 in 6,646 households. The most populous of its 35 villages was Mohammadabad, with 4,548 people.

=== Other villages in the rural district ===
- Abbasabad-e Faramishan
- Ahmadabad
- Aliabad-e Daman
- Amidi-ye Kohneh
- Dowlatabad
- Kat
- Kazemabad
- Malekabad
- Rivand
- Sangan-e Bala Khaf
