= Darakabad, Isfahan =

Village in Isfahan province, Iran

Darakabad Persian: درك اباد
- Village
- Location within Iran
- Coordinates: 32°41′26″N 50°22′37″E
- Country: Iran
- Province: Isfahan
- County: Chadegan
- District: Chenarud
- Rural District: Chenarud-e Shomali

Population (2016)
  - Total: 296
- Time zone: UTC+3:30 (IRST)

Darakabad (Persian: درك اباد) (Note: Also romanized as Darakābād; also known as Darakehābād) is a village in Chenarud-e Shomali Rural District of Chenarud District in Chadegan County, Isfahan province, Iran.

== Demographics ==
=== Population ===
At the time of the 2006 National Census, the village's population was 439 in 80 households. The following census in 2011 counted 395 people in 112 households. The 2016 census measured the population of the village as 296 people in 76 households.
