= Jangal =

City in Razavi Khorasan province, Iran

Jangal Persian: جنگل
- City
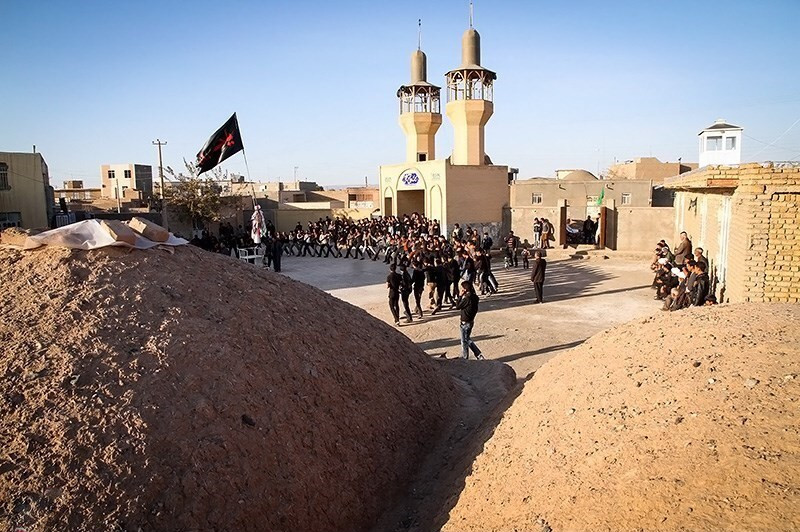

- Location within Iran
- Coordinates: 34°42′10″N 59°13′22″E
- Country: Iran
- Province: Razavi Khorasan
- County: Roshtkhar
- District: Jangal
- Established as a city: 2004

Population (2016)
  - Total: 6,650
- Time zone: UTC+3:30 (IRST)

Jangal (Persian: جنگل) is a city in, and the capital of, Jangal District of Roshtkhar County, Razavi Khorasan province, Iran. It also serves as the administrative center for Jangal Rural District. The village of Jangal was converted to a city in 2004. Jangal means "jungle" or "forest" in Persian.

== Demographics ==
=== Population ===
At the time of the 2006 National Census, the city's population was 6,232 in 1,384 households. The following census in 2011 counted 6,490 people in 1,620 households. The 2016 census measured the population of the city as 6,650 people in 1,737 households.
