= Kalicheh =

Village in Isfahan province, Iran

Kalicheh Persian: كليچه
- Village
- Location within Iran
- Coordinates: 32°37′51″N 50°27′33″E
- Country: Iran
- Province: Isfahan
- County: Chadegan
- District: Chenarud
- Rural District: Chenarud-e Jonubi

Population (2016)
  - Total: 169
- Time zone: UTC+3:30 (IRST)

Kalicheh (Persian: كليچه) (Note: Also romanized as Kalīcheh; also known as Kalījeh, Kalijeh, Kalījer, and Kalūcheh) is a village in Chenarud-e Jonubi Rural District of Chenarud District in Chadegan County, Isfahan province, Iran.

== Demographics ==
=== Population ===
At the time of the 2006 National Census, the village's population was 226 in 57 households. The following census in 2011 counted 186 people in 61 households. The 2016 census measured the population of the village as 169 people in 54 households.
