= Deh-e Bad-e Olya =

Village in Isfahan province, Iran

Deh-e Bad-e Olya Persian: ده بادعليا
- Village
- Location within Iran
- Coordinates: 32°34′03″N 50°23′37″E
- Country: Iran
- Province: Isfahan
- County: Chadegan
- District: Chenarud
- Rural District: Chenarud-e Jonubi

Population (2016)
  - Total: 135
- Time zone: UTC+3:30 (IRST)

Deh-e Bad-e Olya (Persian: ده بادعليا) (Note: Also romanized as Deh Bad Olya and Deh-e Bād-e ‘Olyā; also known as Deh Bād) is a village in Chenarud-e Jonubi Rural District of Chenarud District in Chadegan County, Isfahan province, Iran.

== Demographics ==
=== Population ===
At the time of the 2006 National Census, the village's population was 159 in 37 households. The following census in 2011 counted 162 people in 47 households. The 2016 census measured the population of the village as 135 people in 36 households.
