= Owregan, Isfahan =

Village in Isfahan province, Iran

Owregan Persian: اورگان
- Village
- Location within Iran
- Coordinates: 32°35′44″N 50°25′50″E
- Country: Iran
- Province: Isfahan
- County: Chadegan
- District: Chenarud
- Rural District: Chenarud-e Jonubi

Population (2016)
  - Total: 651
- Time zone: UTC+3:30 (IRST)

Owregan (Persian: اورگان,) (Note: Also romanized as Owregān; also known as Ūrgān; also known as Owregūn) is a village in Chenarud-e Jonubi Rural District of Chenarud District in Chadegan County, Isfahan province, Iran, serving as capital of both the district and the rural district.

== Demographics ==
=== Population ===
At the time of the 2006 National Census, the village's population was 848 in 199 households. The following census in 2011 counted 826 people in 236 households. The 2016 census measured the population of the village as 651 people in 195 households, the most populous in its rural district.
