= Jangal Rural District (Roshtkhar County) =

Rural district in Razavi Khorasan province, Iran

Jangal Rural District Persian: دهستان جنگل
- Rural District
- Location within Iran
- Coordinates: 34°39′N 59°20′E
- Country: Iran
- Province: Razavi Khorasan
- County: Roshtkhar
- District: Jangal
- Established: 1987
- Capital: Jangal

Population (2016)
  - Total: 5,311
- Time zone: UTC+3:30 (IRST)

Jangal Rural District (Persian: دهستان جنگل) is in Jangal District of Roshtkhar County, Razavi Khorasan province, Iran. It is administered from the city of Jangal.

== Demographics ==
=== Population ===
At the time of the 2006 National Census, the rural district's population was 5,066 in 1,080 households. There were 5,126 inhabitants in 1,252 households at the following census of 2011. The 2016 census measured the population of the rural district as 5,311 in 1,423 households. The most populous of its 10 villages was Jannatabad-e Jangal, with 2,659 people.

=== Other villages in the rural district ===
- Ahangaran
- Alinaqi-ye Olya
- Alinaqi-ye Sofla
- Band-e Ozbak
- Chah-e Shur
- Do Chahi
- Do Chahi-ye Bala
- Howz-e Karam
- Kowdeh
