= Roshtkhar =

City in Razavi Khorasan province, Iran

Roshtkhar Persian: رشتخوار
- City
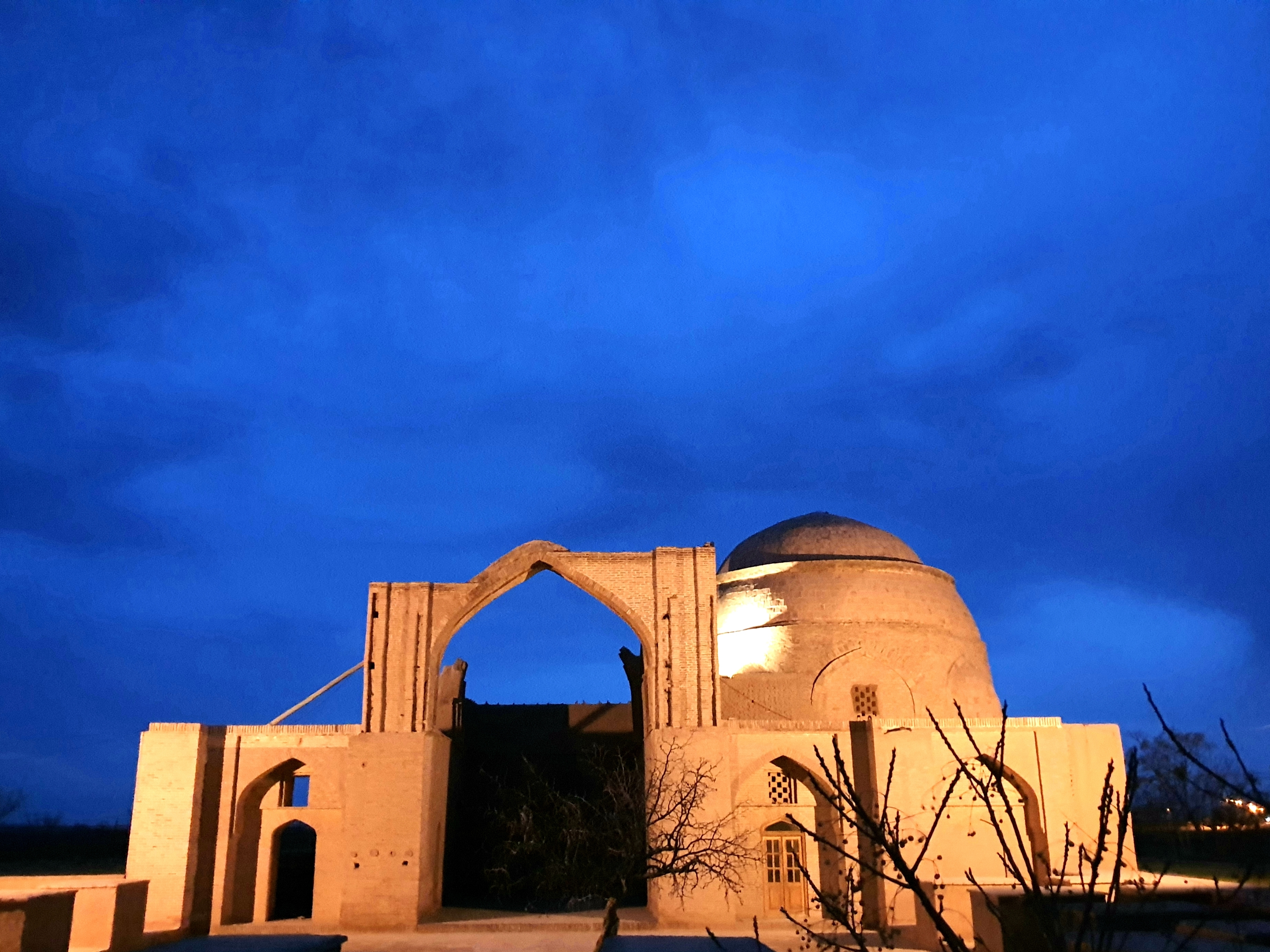
- Grand Mosque of Roshtkhar

- Location within Iran
- Coordinates: 34°58′28″N 59°37′24″E
- Country: Iran
- Province: Razavi Khorasan
- County: Roshtkhar
- District: Central

Population (2016)
  - Total: 7,514
- Time zone: UTC+3:30 (IRST)

Roshtkhar (Persian: رشتخوار) (Note: Also romanized as Rashtkhvār, Roshtkhār, and Roshtkhvār; also known as Rash Khar, Rashkhvān, Roshkhvār, Roshtehkhvār, and Rūshkār) is a city in the Central District of Roshtkhar County, Razavi Khorasan province, Iran, serving as capital of both the county and the district.

== Demographics ==
=== Population ===
At the time of the 2006 National Census, the city's population was 5,123 in 1,278 households. The following census in 2011 counted 6,686 people in 1,703 households. The 2016 census measured the population of the city as 7,514 people in 2,113 households.
