= Cheshmandegan-e Majid =

Village in Isfahan province, Iran

Cheshmandegan-e Majid Persian: چشمندگان مجيد
- Village
- Location within Iran
- Coordinates: 32°42′46″N 50°20′15″E
- Country: Iran
- Province: Isfahan
- County: Chadegan
- District: Chenarud
- Rural District: Chenarud-e Shomali

Population (2016)
  - Total: 211
- Time zone: UTC+3:30 (IRST)

Cheshmandegan-e Majid (Persian: چشمندگان مجيد) (Note: Also romanized as Cheshmandegān-e Majīd) is a village in Chenarud-e Shomali Rural District of Chenarud District in Chadegan County, Isfahan province, Iran.

== Demographics ==
=== Population ===
At the time of the 2006 National Census, the village's population was 203 in 46 households. The following census in 2011 counted 225 people in 55 households. The 2016 census measured the population of the village as 211 people in 61 households.
