= Deh-e Bad-e Sofla =

Village in Isfahan province, Iran

Deh-e Bad-e Sofla Persian: ده بادسفلي
- Village
- Location within Iran
- Coordinates: 32°34′39″N 50°24′10″E
- Country: Iran
- Province: Isfahan
- County: Chadegan
- District: Chenarud
- Rural District: Chenarud-e Jonubi

Population (2016)
  - Total: 145
- Time zone: UTC+3:30 (IRST)

Deh-e Bad-e Sofla (Persian: ده بادسفلي) (Note: Also romanized as Deh-e Bād-e Soflá) is a village in Chenarud-e Jonubi Rural District of Chenarud District in Chadegan County, Isfahan province, Iran.

== Demographics ==
=== Population ===
At the time of the 2006 National Census, the village's population was 190 in 43 households. The following census in 2011 counted 142 people in 44 households. The 2016 census measured the population of the village as 145 people in 40 households.
