= Fardaq =

Village in Razavi Khorasan province, Iran

Fardaq Persian: فاردق
- Village
- Location within Iran
- Coordinates: 34°54′14″N 59°43′17″E
- Country: Iran
- Province: Razavi Khorasan
- County: Roshtkhar
- District: Central
- Rural District: Roshtkhar

Population (2016)
  - Total: 653
- Time zone: UTC+3:30 (IRST)

Fardaq (Persian: فاردق) (Note: Also romanized as Fārdaq; also known as Fārūq (فاروق), Jalālābād, and Jalīlābād (جليل اباد)) is a village in Roshtkhar Rural District of the Central District in Roshtkhar County, Razavi Khorasan province, Iran.

== Demographics ==
=== Population ===
At the time of the 2006 National Census, the village's population was 663 in 158 households. The following census in 2011 counted 683 people in 187 households. The 2016 census measured the population of the village as 653 people in 201 households.
