= Jalalabad, Larestan =

Jalalabad جلال اباد
- Village
- Location within Iran
- Coordinates: 28°09′03″N 53°46′12″E
- Country: Iran
- Province: Fars
- County: Larestan
- Bakhsh: Banaruiyeh
- Rural District: Deh Fish

Population (2006)
  - Total: 137
- Time zone: UTC+3:30 (IRST)
  - Summer (DST): UTC+4:30 (IRDT)

Jalalabad (Persian: جلال اباد, also Romanized as Jalālābād) is a village in Deh Fish Rural District, Banaruiyeh District, Larestan County, Fars province, Iran. At the 2006 census, its population was 137, in 25 families.
