= Asheqan, Sistan and Baluchestan =

Asheqan عاشقان
- Village
- Location within Iran
- Coordinates: 31°11′28″N 61°46′27″E
- Country: Iran
- Province: Sistan and Baluchestan
- County: Hirmand
- Bakhsh: Central
- Rural District: Dust Mohammad

Population (2006)
  - Total: 136
- Time zone: UTC+3:30 (IRST)
  - Summer (DST): UTC+4:30 (IRDT)

Asheqan (Persian: عاشقان, also Romanized as ‘Āsheqān) is a village in Dust Mohammad Rural District, in the Central District of Hirmand County, Sistan and Baluchestan Province, Iran. At the 2006 census, its population was 136, in 21 families.
