= Shurbeyg =

Shurbeyg شوربيگ
- Village
- Location within Iran
- Coordinates: 35°33′11″N 59°10′44″E
- Country: Iran
- Province: Razavi Khorasan
- County: Torbat-e Heydarieh
- Bakhsh: Jolgeh Rokh
- Rural District: Mian Rokh

Population (2006)
  - Total: 75
- Time zone: UTC+3:30 (IRST)
  - Summer (DST): UTC+4:30 (IRDT)

Shurbeyg (Persian: شوربيگ, also Romanized as Shūrbeyg; also known as Jalālābād and Shūrbek) is a village in Mian Rokh Rural District, Jolgeh Rokh District, Torbat-e Heydarieh County, Razavi Khorasan Province, Iran. At the 2006 census, its population was 75, in 20 families.
