= Chehel Cheshmeh, Sepidan =

Chehel Cheshmeh چهل چشمه
- Village
- Location within Iran
- Coordinates: 30°15′24″N 51°57′16″E
- Country: Iran
- Province: Fars
- County: Sepidan
- Bakhsh: Central
- Rural District: Khafri

Population (2006)
  - Total: 74
- Time zone: UTC+3:30 (IRST)
  - Summer (DST): UTC+4:30 (IRDT)

Chehel Cheshmeh (Persian: چهل چشمه) is a village in Khafri Rural District, in the Central District of Sepidan County, Fars province, Iran. At the 2006 census, its population was 74, in 16 families.
