= Dochahi, Kerman =

Dochahi دوچاهي
- Village
- Location within Iran
- Coordinates: 27°50′34″N 57°27′13″E
- Country: Iran
- Province: Kerman
- County: Kahnuj
- Bakhsh: Central
- Rural District: Howmeh

Population (2006)
  - Total: 231
- Time zone: UTC+3:30 (IRST)
  - Summer (DST): UTC+4:30 (IRDT)

Dochahi (Persian: دوچاهي, also Romanized as Dochāhī) is a village in Howmeh Rural District, in the Central District of Kahnuj County, Kerman Province, Iran. At the 2006 census, its population was 231, which was composed of 50 families.
