= Jalalabad, Muzaffargarh =

Jalalabad
- Location within Pakistan
- Coordinates: 30.01°N 71.08°E
- Country: Pakistan
- Province: Punjab
- Elevation: 109 m (358 ft)
- Time zone: UTC+5 (PST)

Jalalabad is a village in the Muzaffargarh District of Punjab, Pakistan. It is located at 30°1'0N 71°8'0E with an altitude of 109 metres (360 feet).
