= Jalalabad, Mashhad =

Jalalabad جلال اباد
- Village
- Location within Iran
- Coordinates: 35°53′59″N 60°08′09″E
- Country: Iran
- Province: Razavi Khorasan
- County: Mashhad
- Bakhsh: Razaviyeh
- Rural District: Abravan

Population (2006)
  - Total: 541
- Time zone: UTC+3:30 (IRST)
  - Summer (DST): UTC+4:30 (IRDT)

Jalalabad (Persian: جلال اباد, also Romanized as Jalālābād; also known as Olang-e Shāhī) is a village in Abravan Rural District, Razaviyeh District, Mashhad County, Razavi Khorasan Province, Iran. At the 2006 census, its population was 541, in 134 families.
