= Jalalabad-e Tavalayi =

Jalalabad-e Tavalayi جلال ابادتولايي
- Village
- Location within Iran
- Coordinates: 29°10′28″N 53°28′35″E
- Country: Iran
- Province: Fars
- County: Fasa
- Bakhsh: Central
- Rural District: Jangal

Population (2006)
  - Total: 95
- Time zone: UTC+3:30 (IRST)
  - Summer (DST): UTC+4:30 (IRDT)

Jalalabad-e Tavalayi (Persian: جلال ابادتولايي, also Romanized as Jalālābād-e Tavalāyī; also known as Jalālābād) is a village in Jangal Rural District, in the Central District of Fasa County, Fars province, Iran. At the 2006 census, its population was 95, in 24 families.
