= Jalalabad-e Dezak =

Jalalabad-e Dezak جلال اباددزك
- Village
- Location within Iran
- Coordinates: 32°02′45″N 54°04′58″E
- Country: Iran
- Province: Yazd
- County: Saduq
- Bakhsh: Central
- Rural District: Rostaq

Population (2006)
  - Total: 135
- Time zone: UTC+3:30 (IRST)
  - Summer (DST): UTC+4:30 (IRDT)

Jalalabad-e Dezak (Persian: جلال اباددزك, also Romanized as Jalālābād-e Dezak; also known as Jalālābād, Jalālābād-e Now, and Jalal Abad Rastagh) is a village in Rostaq Rural District, in the Central District of Saduq County, Yazd Province, Iran. At the 2006 census, its population was 135 in 33 families.
