= Jalilabad, East Azerbaijan =

Jalilabad جليل اباد
- Village
- Location within Iran
- Coordinates: 37°06′32″N 46°41′56″E
- Country: Iran
- Province: East Azerbaijan
- County: Charuymaq
- Bakhsh: Central
- Rural District: Quri Chay-ye Sharqi

Population (2006)
  - Total: 42
- Time zone: UTC+3:30 (IRST)
  - Summer (DST): UTC+4:30 (IRDT)

Jalilabad (Persian: جليل اباد, also Romanized as Jalīlābād) is a village in Quri Chay-ye Sharqi Rural District, in the Central District of Charuymaq County, East Azerbaijan Province, Iran. At the 2006 census, its population was 42, in 8 families.
