= Senagun, Kohgiluyeh and Boyer-Ahmad =

Senagun سنگون
- Village
- Location within Iran
- Coordinates: 30°40′27″N 50°28′17″E
- Country: Iran
- Province: Kohgiluyeh and Boyer-Ahmad
- County: Kohgiluyeh
- Bakhsh: Central
- Rural District: Dehdasht-e Gharbi

Population (2006)
  - Total: 357
- Time zone: UTC+3:30 (IRST)
  - Summer (DST): UTC+4:30 (IRDT)

Senagun (Persian: سنگون, also Romanized as Senāgūn and Sangūn; also known as Şenūgān) is a village in Dehdasht-e Gharbi Rural District, in the Central District of Kohgiluyeh County, Kohgiluyeh and Boyer-Ahmad Province, Iran. At the 2006 census, its population was 357, in 81 families.
