= Jalilabad, Firuzkuh =

Jalilabad جليل آباد
- Village
- Location within Iran
- Coordinates: 35°40′37″N 52°43′24″E
- Country: Iran
- Province: Tehran
- County: Firuzkuh
- Bakhsh: Central
- Rural District: Shahrabad

Population (2016)
  - Total: 65
- Time zone: UTC+3:30 (IRST)

Jalilabad (Persian: جليل آباد, also Romanized as Jalīlābād) is a village in Shahrabad Rural District, in the Central District of Firuzkuh County, Tehran Province, Iran.

At the time of the 2006 National Census, the village's population was 59 in 17 households. The following census in 2011 counted 128 people in 40 households. The 2016 census measured the population of the village as 65 people in 25 households.
