= Jalilabad, Mamasani =

Jalilabad جليل اباد
- Village
- Location within Iran
- Coordinates: 29°53′30″N 52°01′38″E
- Country: Iran
- Province: Fars
- County: Mamasani
- Bakhsh: Doshman Ziari
- Rural District: Doshman Ziari

Population (2006)
  - Total: 29
- Time zone: UTC+3:30 (IRST)
  - Summer (DST): UTC+4:30 (IRDT)

Jalilabad (Persian: جليل اباد, also Romanized as Jalīlābād) is a village in Doshman Ziari Rural District, Doshman Ziari District, Mamasani County, Fars province, Iran. At the 2006 census, its population was 29, in 7 families.
