= Jalalabad, Fahraj =

Jalalabad جلال اباد
- Village
- Location within Iran
- Coordinates: 28°48′23″N 59°11′02″E
- Country: Iran
- Province: Kerman
- County: Fahraj
- Bakhsh: Negin Kavir
- Rural District: Chahdegal

Population (2006)
  - Total: 201
- Time zone: UTC+3:30 (IRST)
  - Summer (DST): UTC+4:30 (IRDT)

Jalalabad (Persian: جلال اباد, also Romanized as Jalālābād; also known as Jalālābād-e Pā’īn) is a village in Chahdegal Rural District, Negin Kavir District, Fahraj County, Kerman Province, Iran. At the 2006 census, its population was 201, in 35 families.
