= Shabeh Rural District =

Rural district in Razavi Khorasan province, Iran

Shabeh Rural District Persian: دهستان شعبه
- Rural District
- Location within Iran
- Coordinates: 34°55′N 59°18′E
- Country: Iran
- Province: Razavi Khorasan
- County: Roshtkhar
- District: Jangal
- Established: 2002
- Capital: Shabeh

Population (2016)
  - Total: 2,381
- Time zone: UTC+3:30 (IRST)

Shabeh Rural District (Persian: دهستان شعبه) is in Jangal District of Roshtkhar County, Razavi Khorasan province, Iran. Its capital is the village of Shabeh.

== Demographics ==
=== Population ===
At the time of the 2006 National Census, the rural district's population was 3,328 in 834 households. There were 2,831 inhabitants in 788 households at the following census of 2011. The 2016 census measured the population of the rural district as 2,381 in 695 households. The most populous of its 13 villages was Haqnabad, with 562 people.

=== Other villages in the rural district ===
- Abbasabad-e Jadid
- Aminabad
- Ebrahimabad
- Fazel Mand
- Feyzabad
- Moharramabad
- Sadabad
