= Jalalabad, Multan =

Jalalabad
- Location within Pakistan
- Coordinates: 30.08°N 71.21°E
- Country: Pakistan
- Province: Punjab
- Elevation: 115 m (377 ft)
- Time zone: UTC+5 (PST)

Jalalabad (Urdu: جلال آباد) is a village in the Multan District of Punjab, Pakistan. It is located at 30°8'10N 71°21'0E at an altitude of 115 metres (380 feet). In 2003, the village was hit by flooding, destroying houses and crops.
