= Jalalabad, Dalgan =

Jalalabad جلال آباد
- Village
- Country: Iran
- Province: Sistan and Baluchestan
- County: Dalgan
- Bakhsh: Jolgeh-ye Chah Hashem
- Rural District: Jolgeh-ye Chah Hashem

Population (2006)
  - Total: 18
- Time zone: UTC+3:30 (IRST)
  - Summer (DST): UTC+4:30 (IRDT)

Jalalabad (Persian: جلال آباد, also Romanized as Jalālābād) is a village in Jolgeh-ye Chah Hashem Rural District, Jolgeh-ye Chah Hashem District, Dalgan County, Sistan and Baluchestan Province, Iran. At the 2006 census, its population was 18, in 4 families.
