= Jalalabad, Kuhestan =

Jalalabad جلال اباد
- Village
- Location within Iran
- Coordinates: 32°51′48″N 52°57′13″E
- Country: Iran
- Province: Isfahan
- County: Nain
- Bakhsh: Central
- Rural District: Kuhestan

Population (2006)
  - Total: 10
- Time zone: UTC+3:30 (IRST)
  - Summer (DST): UTC+4:30 (IRDT)

Jalalabad (Persian: جلال اباد, also Romanized as Jalālābād) is a village in Kuhestan Rural District, in the Central District of Nain County, Isfahan Province, Iran. According to the 2006 census, its population was ten persons in five families.
