= Asheqan-e Abedin =

Asheqan-e Abedin عاشقان عابدين
- Village
- Location within Iran
- Coordinates: 34°18′40″N 46°31′38″E
- Country: Iran
- Province: Kermanshah
- County: Eslamabad-e Gharb
- Bakhsh: Central
- Rural District: Howmeh-ye Shomali

Population (2006)
  - Total: 81
- Time zone: UTC+3:30 (IRST)
  - Summer (DST): UTC+4:30 (IRDT)

Asheqan-e Abedin (Persian: عاشقان عابدين, also Romanized as ‘Āsheqān-e ‘Ābedīn; also known as ‘Āsheqān-e ‘Ābedīn Beyg) is a village in Howmeh-ye Shomali Rural District, in the Central District of Eslamabad-e Gharb County, Kermanshah Province, Iran. At the 2006 census, its population was 81, in 20 families.
