= Jalalabad, Karachi =

Jalalabad (Urdu: جلال آباد) is a neighbourhood of North Nazimabad Town in Karachi, Sindh, Pakistan.

There are several ethnic groups including Muhajirs, Sindhis, Punjabis, Kashmiris, Seraikis, Pakhtuns, Balochis, Memons, Bohras and Ismailis. Over 99% of the population is Muslim. Pakhtun community predominates this neighbourhood.
