= Jalalabad, Baharestan =

Jalalabad جلال اباد
- Village
- Location within Iran
- Coordinates: 32°54′55″N 52°42′18″E
- Country: Iran
- Province: Isfahan
- County: Nain
- Bakhsh: Central
- Rural District: Baharestan

Population (2006)
  - Total: 16
- Time zone: UTC+3:30 (IRST)
  - Summer (DST): UTC+4:30 (IRDT)

Jalalabad (Persian: جلال اباد, also Romanized as Jalālābād; also known as Jalālābād-e Golestān) is a village in Baharestan Rural District, in the Central District of Nain County, Isfahan Province, Iran. At the 2006 census, its population was 16, in 8 families.
