= Asheqan, Hormozgan =

Asheqan عاشقان
- Village
- Location within Iran
- Coordinates: 26°21′26″N 57°13′00″E
- Country: Iran
- Province: Hormozgan
- County: Minab
- Bakhsh: Byaban
- Rural District: Byaban

Population (2006)
  - Total: 115
- Time zone: UTC+3:30 (IRST)
  - Summer (DST): UTC+4:30 (IRDT)

Asheqan (Persian: عاشقان, also Romanized as ‘Āsheqān; also known as Ashkan and Hāshekān) is a village in Byaban Rural District, Byaban District, Minab County, Hormozgan Province, Iran. At the 2006 census, its population was 115, in 24 families.
