= Jalalabad, Habiganj Sadar =

Jalalabad (Bengali: জালালাবাদ) is a village in Richi Union, Habiganj Sadar Upazila in the Sylhet Division of Bangladesh.

== Geography ==
Jalalabad is located within Richi Union. The village is situated in a low-lying haor area prone to seasonal flooding. The Khowai River embankment in Jalalabad serves as a critical road and flood barrier for over 100 villages in Richi, Lukra, and Karab Unions of Habiganj Sadar, as well as parts of Lakhai Upazila and even neighbouring Kishoreganj District.

== Demographics ==
Jalalabad village has a population of 2,676 people.

== Culture ==
North Jalalabad and West Jalalabad neighbourhoods have their own mosques and graveyards respectively, and there is one Jalalabad Shahi Eidgah. It also has a Government Primary School (also serves as a polling centre in local elections) and madrasa.

== History ==
The embankment of the Khowai River in Jalalabad collapsed in June 2024, destroying crops, fish enclosures (ghers), and homes across a vast area. Flooding in August 2024 worsened the damage, with erosion expanding by approximately 200 feet and turning the site into a large ditch. Over 100 villages in Lukra (Lokra), Richi, and Karab unions depend on this embankment road for connectivity (also used by Kishoreganjis). Commuters now use battery-powered auto-rickshaws to reach the eroded spot and then cross by boat, severely disrupting transport of goods and daily travel. Hundreds of acres of haor farmland are at risk, especially during the Boro rice season. Without repairs, low-lying areas (including villages near Habiganj town) face heightened flooding. As of 3 January 2025 (seven months after the collapse), no repairs had been carried out despite repeated requests to the Bangladesh Water Development Board. Residents held several meetings with officials, but work had not started. Design data and an estimated cost of around 50,000,000 Bangladeshi takas were sent to the circle office in September 2024; funding approval was still pending.

In June 2025, a severe fire broke out at the Jalalabad Haji Bari, completely destroying two houses.
