= Jalalabad, Hormozgan =

Jalalabad جلال اباد
- Village
- Location within Iran
- Coordinates: 27°49′44″N 57°17′02″E
- Country: Iran
- Province: Hormozgan
- County: Rudan
- Bakhsh: Rudkhaneh
- Rural District: Rudkhaneh Bar

Population (2006)
  - Total: 82
- Time zone: UTC+3:30 (IRST)
  - Summer (DST): UTC+4:30 (IRDT)

Jalalabad (Persian: جلال اباد, also romanized as Jalālābād) is a village in Rudkhaneh Bar Rural District, Rudkhaneh District, Rudan County, Hormozgan Province, Iran. At the 2006 census, its population was 82, in 20 families.
