= Khodaabad-e Bala =

Khodaabad-e Bala خداابادبالا
- Village
- Location within Iran
- Coordinates: 31°45′00″N 53°53′05″E
- Country: Iran
- Province: Yazd
- County: Taft
- Bakhsh: Central
- Rural District: Nasrabad

Population (2006)
  - Total: 16
- Time zone: UTC+3:30 (IRST)
  - Summer (DST): UTC+4:30 (IRDT)

Khodaabad-e Bala (Persian: خداابادبالا, also Romanized as Khodāābād-e Bālā; also known as Khodāābād-e ‘Olyā) is a village in Nasrabad Rural District, in the Central District of Taft County, Yazd Province, Iran. At the 2006 census, its population was 16, in 8 families.
