= Do Chahi, South Khorasan =

Do Chahi دوچاهي
- Village
- Country: Iran
- Province: South Khorasan
- County: Qaen
- Bakhsh: Central
- Rural District: Qaen

Population (2006)
  - Total: 56
- Time zone: UTC+3:30 (IRST)
  - Summer (DST): UTC+4:30 (IRDT)

Do Chahi (Persian: دوچاهي, also Romanized as Do Chāhī) is a village in Qaen Rural District, in the Central District of Qaen County, South Khorasan Province, Iran. At the 2006 census, its population was 56, in 17 families.
