= Jalalabad, Sargodha =

Jalalabad
- Location within Pakistan
- Coordinates: 32.13°N 72.48°E
- Country: Pakistan
- Province: Punjab
- District: Sargodha
- Elevation: 190 m (620 ft)
- Time zone: UTC+5 (PST)

Jalalabad is a village in Sargodha District of Punjab, Pakistan. It is located at 32°13'54N 72°48'0E, at an altitude of 190 metres (626 feet).
