= Jalal Khan Orakzai =

Afghan hero and commander (18th century)

Jalāl Khān Orakzai
- جلال خان وركزۍ

Personal details
- Died: 26 December 1717 (Note: 22nd Muharram, 1130 AH)

Military service
- Allegiance: Mughal Empire
- Battles/wars: Deccan wars Siege of Jalalabad (1710)

Jalal Khan Orakzai (Note: or Jalal Khan Rohilla) (Pashto: جلال خان وركزۍ) was an Afghan servicemen of the Mughal Empire who repulsed a larger Sikh force at the siege of Jalalabad.

== Background ==
Jalal Khan's father Hazar Mir Warakzai of Miranzai Khel came to India during the reign of Shah Jahan. He hailed from the Orakzai tribe of Pashtuns.

He lived at and was the Faujdar of the town of Jalalabad which was founded by him. Jalal Khan had also served under the command of Aurangzeb in the Deccan wars. He had a strongly built fort around the town of Jalalabad.

== Defense and Battle ==
In the Punjab region, barbarities were perpetrated upon the people by the armies of Banda Singh Bairagi who was a Khalsa Fauj general of the First Sikh State. Mughal historian Ghulām Ḥusein Ṭabāṭabā writes in Siyar-ul-Mutakhkherin that:

"He (Guru Gobind) was succeeded by Banda, that butcher-like man. This infernal man having assembled multitudes of desperate fellows, all as enthusiasts, and all as thirsty of revenge as himself, commenced ravaging the country with such a barbarity as had never had an example in India. They spared no Mohammedan, whether man or woman or child. Pregnant women had their bellies ripped open, and their children dashed against their faces or against the walls. It is no wonder that the mild Bahadur Shah shuddered on hearing of such atrocious deeds."

A large horde of Banda Singh Bairagi at 70 to 80 thousand men had invaded different towns and subjected them to atrocities, the women of these towns who had rarely even left the court of their homes were forced to walk distances of thirty to forty miles and many women threw themselves into wells to avoid outrage.

Just to the south of Saharanpur was the town of Jalālābād, the Sikhs wrote to Faujdar Jalal Khan to submit, he responded by parading the messengers around the town and sending them back.

"Don't hope to find in me the Nawabs of Sadhaura or Sarhind and if you have to fight me with that much estimate of strength, you are sadly mistaken. You are welcome to fight, as I am sure you will soon reap the result of your folly. My army consists of Khybri Pathans, whom the very appearance of death even cannot intimidate. So bear you in mind that you will have to face such a people and not the timid inhabitants of Hindustan. And the Sikhs I will not set free under the threat of war."

— Jalal Khan Orakzai

He then made immediate preparations for the town's defense by collecting men and ammunition as the Sikh force then approached the town and surrounded two nearby villages. He sent a Lashkar (Note: Means "army" or "military force" especially in the Mughal era for a large group of soldiers.) headed by his grandson Ghulam Muhammad Khan and cousin Hizbar Khan. Besieged villagers then came out with their bows and repulsed the attacking force several times.

Ensuing the struggle of the villages, with the entire army force of seventy to eighty thousand, the Sikhs went onto approach the walls and town gate and showered their firepower upon the Afghans, then rushed forward to the wall intending to dig through, set up ladders and ignite the gates on fire. However while in the process of this, the Afghans surprised the Sikhs and came out sword in hand with shields to their faces and cut down two hundred to three hundred soldiers while taking many casualties on their own side.

Other skirmishes occurred and further attempts were made for twenty days, and eventually after losing thousands of men the Sikhs withdrew failing to take the town and turning back from the Doab.

== Decoration ==
Jalal Khan was rewarded by the Nazim of Delhi, on 31 August 1710 AD, with the Faujdari of Saharanpur which was a deserted position by Ali Hamid Qanauji as well as receiving further promotions in rank by his Mughal superiors.
