= Jalalabad Union, Sylhet Sadar =

Jalalabad জালালাবাদ ইউনিয়ন Rajargaon
- Union Council
- Jalalabad Union Council
- Location in Bangladesh
- Country: Bangladesh
- Division: Sylhet Division
- District: Sylhet District
- Upazila: Sylhet Sadar Upazila

Government
  - MP (Sylhet-1): Khandaker Abdul Muktadir

Area
  - Total: 33.04 km^{2} (12.76 sq mi)

Population
  - Total: 17,968
  - Density: 543.8/km^{2} (1,409/sq mi)
- Demonym: Jalalabadi
- Time zone: UTC+6 (BST)
- Website: jalalabadup.sylhet.gov.bd

Jalalabad Union (Bengali: জালালাবাদ ইউনিয়ন) is a Union Parishad under Sylhet Sadar Upazila of Sylhet District in the Sylhet Division of Bangladesh. It has an area of 33.04 square kilometres and a population of 17,968.

== Geography ==
Jalalabad Union borders South Ranikhai Union (Companiganj Upazila) in the north, Singra River and Mogalgaon Union in the south and Kalaruka Union (Chhatak Upazila) in the west and Hatkhola Union to its east. It has an area of 33.04 square kilometres.

== History ==
The 24 villages located north of the Chenger Khal river were collectively referred to as Rajargaon (Village of the Raja) in the past. It was renamed to Jalalabad in honor of the Sufi missionary Shah Jalal when it was established as a union.

== Demography ==
Jalalabad has a population of 17,968.

== Administration ==
Jalalabad Union contains 18 villages contained into six mouzas and nine wards. The villages are:

1. Alinagar-Palpur
2. Alinagar North
3. Alinagar South
4. Alinagar-Noagaon
5. Basairpar
6. Dabada Kandi
7. Sardarer Gaon
8. Puran Kalaruka
9. East Kalaruka
10. Kalaruka-Lalpur
11. Kurir Gaon
12. Digalbak-Noagaon
13. Khaser Gaon
14. Rayergaon
15. Islampur
16. Islampur-Munshinagar
17. Sirajpur-Kalirgaon
18. Taherpur
