= Asheqan-e Musa =

Asheqan-e Musa عاشقان موسي
- Village
- Location within Iran
- Coordinates: 34°17′48″N 46°30′59″E
- Country: Iran
- Province: Kermanshah
- County: Eslamabad-e Gharb
- Bakhsh: Central
- Rural District: Howmeh-ye Shomali

Population (2006)
  - Total: 197
- Time zone: UTC+3:30 (IRST)
  - Summer (DST): UTC+4:30 (IRDT)

Asheqan-e Musa (Persian: عاشقان موسي, also Romanized as ‘Āsheqān-e Mūsá; also known as ‘Āsheqān-e Mūsá Beyg) is a village in Howmeh-ye Shomali Rural District, in the Central District of Eslamabad-e Gharb County, Kermanshah Province, Iran. At the 2006 census, its population was 197, in 39 families.
