= Jalalabad, Sharifabad =

Jalalabad جلال اباد
- Village
- Location within Iran
- Coordinates: 29°29′09″N 55°35′46″E
- Country: Iran
- Province: Kerman
- County: Sirjan
- Bakhsh: Central
- Rural District: Sharifabad

Population (2006)
  - Total: 318
- Time zone: UTC+3:30 (IRST)
  - Summer (DST): UTC+4:30 (IRDT)

Jalalabad (Persian: جلال اباد, also Romanized as Jalālābād; also known as Jalīlābād and Khalīlābād) is a village in Sharifabad Rural District, in the Central District of Sirjan County, Kerman Province, Iran. At the 2006 census, its population was 318, in 74 families.
