= Khodaabad, Fars =

Khodaabad خداباد
- Village
- Location within Iran
- Coordinates: 29°43′22″N 51°33′43″E
- Country: Iran
- Province: Fars
- County: Kazerun
- Bakhsh: Central
- Rural District: Deris

Population (2006)
  - Total: 329
- Time zone: UTC+3:30 (IRST)
  - Summer (DST): UTC+4:30 (IRDT)

Khodaabad (Persian: خداباد, also Romanized as Khodāābād; also known as Khowdābād and Khudābād) is a village in Deris Rural District, in the Central District of Kazerun County, Fars province, Iran. At the 2006 census, its population was 329, in 76 families.
