= Jalalabad, Jiroft =

Jalalabad جلال اباد
- Village
- Location within Iran
- Coordinates: 28°33′54″N 57°48′55″E
- Country: Iran
- Province: Kerman
- County: Jiroft
- Bakhsh: Central
- Rural District: Dowlatabad

Population (2006)
  - Total: 174
- Time zone: UTC+3:30 (IRST)
  - Summer (DST): UTC+4:30 (IRDT)

Jalalabad (Persian: جلال اباد, also Romanized as Jalālābād; also known as Jalīlābād) is a village in Dowlatabad Rural District, in the Central District of Jiroft County, Kerman Province, Iran. At the 2006 census, its population was 174, in 41 families.
