= Jalalabad, Shamli =

Jalalabad, Shamli Jalalabad Jallabad
- Town
- Nickname: Jalalabad (Uttar Pradesh)
- Interactive map of Jalalabad, Shamli
- Country: India
- State: Uttar Pradesh
- District: Shamli district
- Founder: Jalal Khan
- Elevation: 133 m (436 ft)

Population (2011)
  - Total: 27,921

Languages
  - Official: Hindi
- Time zone: UTC+5:30 (IST)

Jalalabad (Jalālābād) is a town and a nagar panchayat in Shamli district in the Indian state of Uttar Pradesh. It is a historical town situated on Delhi Saharanpur road. Dating back to the Mughal period, situated close to the borders of Haryana and Uttarakhand states, and surrounded by a very fertile agricultural region namely ( Ahata Gaunsgarh, Nagal, Khanpur, Ahmedpur, Chandona, Pandokhedi, Kamalpur Bakdoli, Umarpur, Tilafra, Hasanpur Luhari) famous for plentiful yields in grains and fruits, Jalalabad is internationally famous for its wood carving work cottage industry. It is a thriving market of local agricultural produce, including basmati rice and mangoes. A variety of agro-based industrial enterprises - such as textile, sugar, paper and cigarette factories - are located around it. It is 41 km from Saharanpur and 40 km from Muzaffarnagar.

== History ==
Little is known about the history of the Muzzaffaranagar district as an administrative unit until the reign of Akbar. In his days, the present parganas roughly corresponded to the sixteen mahals, which formed a part of two sirkars (Delhi and Saharanpur) in the subah of Delhi. Of these mahals, Sardhana was included in the sirkar of Saharanpur and together with the bulk of the present district of Muzaffarnagar, formed a dastur (an administrative unit). Jalalabad came under the Meerut dastur.

Prior to Muslim rule in the area, Jalalabad in Muzaffarnagar was known as Manhar Kheda, styled after Thakur Manhar Singh Pundir, the then ruler of that region. Pundirs, while constructing a road for Shakumbri Devi picked a fight with Aurangzeb and after initial victories, lost due to treachery by Baloch and Pathan tribals. Later the Baloch and the Pathans loyal to Aurangzeb ruled this Fort of Manhar Kheda.

The town of Jalalabad was founded by Jalal Khan, an Afghan, along with a community of Rohilla Pathans who had their homes in the region. While he was no longer the faujdar, Jalal Khan and Sayyid Taj-ud-Din Barha, along with his Barha Sayyid cavalrymen who inhabited Muzaffarnagar, defeated the Sikh army under Banda Singh Bahadur.

Later, the tehsil of Ghaziabad constituted the mahals (administrative units) of Jalalabad, along with Dasna and Loni. Under the Marathas, the districts were included in the Saharanpur, or Baoni division, which consisted of fifty two parganas, and this arrangement continued till 1803, when, by a treaty, the Sindhia ceded to the British the whole of his possessions between the Ganges and the Yamuna. The conquered territory was partition and attached to the districts of Etawah, Aligarh and Moradabad. The last-named including Saharanpur, Muzaffarnagar and the parganas in the neighbourhood of Hapur and Meerut.

In 1804, the upper doab was separated by the Moradabad district and was constituted into a new district (under the name of Saharanpur) flanked by the Ganga on the east of the Yamuna on the west end bounded by some hills (called the Srinagar hills) on the north and the district of Aligarh on the south. Between 1804 and 1806, the parganas of Baghpat, Sarnawa, Loni, Chhaprauli, Dasana, Jalalabad and Dadri were placed in the charge of the residents at Delhi but later were attached to the southern division of Saharanpur, with a collector resident at Meerut, the revenue administration of the northern division being under the collector stationed at Saharanpur. The district of Meerut came into being in 1818 and included the southern division of the Saharanpur district and the Aligarh parganas of Dankaur Kasna Adha, Tilbegampur, Sikandarabad, Baran, Malagarh, Agauta and Ahar-Malakpur. This position remained unaltered till 1824, when the Aligarh Parganas with Thana Farida and Dadri, were transferred to the new district of Bulandshahar and the parganas of Khatauli, Soron, Lalukheri, Jansath, Shamli, Baghpat and Jauli to the new district of Muzaffarnagar. The tehsils of the district in 1823 were Meerut, Pariksjitgarh, Khatauli, Kandhla, Dasna, Hapur and Sikandarabad. By this time, district had assumed something of its present shape and size, but its boundaries, area and internal adjustments kept on undergoing several changes till 1859. The first change took place in 1835 (after the lapse of the jagir of Bala Bai of Gwalior), when the district was reconstituted with the tahsils of Meerut, Hastinapur, Kandhla, Baghpat, Dasna, Hapur, and Puth-Siyana; the second with the lapse of the estates of Begum Samru in 1836, when the parganas of Sardhana, Barnawa and Kotana were included in the district, each forming a separate tahsil till 1840; the third in 1842, when the parganas of Shikarpur, Sambhlera, Bhuma, Kandhla and Budhana were transferred to Muzaffarnagar, the tahsils constituting the district then being Meerut, Sardhana, Baraut, Baghpat, Hapur and Dasna; the fourth in 1853 when 110 villages of Loni and 14 of Dasna were transferred to Delhi, 15 being given to Muzaffarnagar and 7 being received in exchange.

In 1859, pargana Loni was restored to Meerut and its consisted of 130 villages, of which 104 were those that had been transferred to Delhi, and 26 were new villages that belonged to Delhi. In May of that year, the district was reorganised so far as to constitute six tahsils, those of Meerut with 323 estates; Sardhana with 154; Baghpat with 277; Muradnagar with 266; Hapur with 329; and Mawana with 289. In 1859 the headquarters of Muradnagar tahsil was transferred to Ghaziabad, the same arrangement continuing till now. All the villages within five miles (8 km) of the railway bridge on the Yamuna were transferred from this district to the Delhi province on 1 April 1915, the area thus lost being 29,177 acres (118.08 km^{2}) or approximately 46 square miles (120 km^{2}).

== Geography ==
Jalalabad is located at 29.37°N 77.25°E. It has an average elevation of 133 metres (436 feet).

== Demographics ==
As of 2001 India census, Jalalabad had a population of 23,568. Males constitute 54% of the population and females 46%. Jalalabad has an average literacy rate of 37%, lower than the national average of 59.5%: male literacy is 45%, and female literacy is 28%. In Jalalabad, 19% of the population is under 6 years of age. It has a cosmopolitan culture.

== Economy ==
Jalalabad is famous for garlic production. The main crops are garlic, onions, potato, and sugarcane.
