= Chenarud-e Jonubi Rural District =

Rural district in Isfahan province, Iran

Chenarud-e Jonubi Rural District Persian: دهستان چنارود جنوبي
- Rural District
- Location within Iran
- Coordinates: 32°36′N 50°22′E
- Country: Iran
- Province: Isfahan
- County: Chadegan
- District: Chenarud
- Established: 1987
- Capital: Owregan

Population (2016)
  - Total: 1,945
- Time zone: UTC+3:30 (IRST)

Chenarud-e Jonubi Rural District (Persian: دهستان چنارود جنوبي) is in the Chenarud District of Chadegan County, Isfahan province, Iran. Its capital is the village of Owregan.

== Demographics ==
=== Population ===
At the time of the 2006 National Census, the rural district's population was 2,651 in 570 households. There were 2,421 inhabitants in 679 households at the following census of 2011. The 2016 census measured the population of the rural district as 1,945 in 563 households. The most populous of its 26 villages was Owregan, with 651 people.

=== Other villages in the rural district ===
- Aliabad
- Deh-e Bad-e Olya
- Deh-e Bad-e Sofla
- Dowlatabad
- Hermanak
- Kalicheh
