= Siege of Jalalabad (1710) =

Conflict in the Mughal-Sikh Wars

- Part of Mughal-Sikh Wars
Date	July–August 1710
Location	Jalalabad, Muzaffarnagar, India
Result	Mughal victory

Belligerents
Mughal Empire	First Sikh State

Commanders and leaders
Jalal Khan Orakzai; Dindar Ali Khan; Hazbar Khan †; Jamal Khan †; Pir Khan †; Saiyid Taj-ud-Din Barha	Banda Singh Bahadur

Strength
5,400–6,400 according to Sagoo, and unknown number of Ghazis; 12,000 according to IHC	70,000–80,000

Casualties and losses
High	High

The siege of Jalalabad occurred in 1710 between the Mughal (Note: made up of Afghans) forces of Jalal Khan and the Sikh forces of Banda Singh Bahadur. Banda Singh Bahadur attacked the Mughal stronghold of Jalalabad. The army opposing Banda Singh was composed of a sizeable number of the Mughal zamindars and shurafa, including many Sadat, Banda Singh Bahadur repelled Mughal and Pathan forces after four days from the battlefield and back into the town, but failed to capture the town and withdrew.

== Background ==
Banda Singh Bahadur was notified that Sikh people were imprisoned and persecuted in the village of Unarsa, and the conditions were distressing for the Hindus, facing cruel treatment and tyranny in the town of Jalalabad, ruled by Jalal Khan Orakzai, a Rohilla Afghan of high renown and military experience. Banda Singh sent his emissaries to Jalal Khan to stop the oppression against the non-Muslims but his messengers were mistreated by being put on horses and paraded through the town, afterwards being sent back. Therefore, Banda Singh Bahadur marched towards Jalalabad. On the way to Jalalabad, Banda Singh defeated, captured and plundered Sarsawa, Saharanpur, Beyhut, Ambeyta, Nanauta, with half the administrative towns of Saharanpur falling under Sikh rule.

== Battle and siege ==
Upon hearing of the nearby villages assailed by the Sikhs and their advance towards his capital, Jalal Khan the former faujdar and Sayyid Taj-ud-Din Barha began preparations to defend his town and fort. He dispatched an army of musketeers, archers and cavalry to provide relief to the besieged villages. The arrival of Jalal Khan's reinforcements encouraged and emboldened the besieged peasantry and villagers to engage the Sikhs in battle. His army in Saharanpur were composed of Sayyids and other zamindars numbering 6,000 cavalry. Several conflicts later ensued between the Sikhs and the ruling class of the region, known as the Shurafa. As the Sikhs advanced halfway from Nanauta to Jalalabad, they were confronted by the Mughal Army commanded by Jalal Khan's nephew, Hazbar Khan, and his brother in law, Ghulam Mohammad Khan Banira. The sanguinary battle took place for 3–4 days where the Sikhs caused heavy casualty on the Mughal camp and on the other side while Jalal Khan didn't move outside of Jalalabad, his relatives inflicted heavy losses on the Sikh encampments during their night attacks. Jalal Khan's nephews Jamal Khan and Pir Khan were ultimately killed along with Hazbar Khan and numerous ghazis, resulting in the repulsion of the Mughal Army back into the town walls. The town was eventually besieged, the countryside of Jalalabad was devastated by the Sikhs but they were repulsed during their numerous attempts to capture the fort and town. Their tactics included encircling the town with wooden cannons, attempting to destroy the town walls, climbing up the walls and burning the gates but they remained unsuccessful. Due to the strong walls of the town, the unpleasant weather that flooded the surrounding of the fort, along with its banks overflowed by the River Krishna, and especially after being notified of urgent calls from the Sikhs of central Punjab appealing for help against their local faujdars, and that the Mughal emperor Bahadur Shah had sent reinforcements to recover the lost territories in Punjab, Banda Singh Bahadur abandoned the siege for more urgent matters after 20 days of ineffectual fighting and the loss of several soldiers. At the time of the siege, Banda was reported to have been commanding an army of 70,000–80,000 men.
