= Roshtkhar Rural District =

Rural district in Razavi Khorasan province, Iran

Roshtkhar Rural District Persian: دهستان رشتخوار
- Rural District
- Location within Iran
- Coordinates: 34°59′N 59°41′E
- Country: Iran
- Province: Razavi Khorasan
- County: Roshtkhar
- District: Central
- Established: 1987
- Capital: Hoseynabad-e Roshtkhar

Population (2016)
  - Total: 16,440
- Time zone: UTC+3:30 (IRST)

Roshtkhar Rural District (Persian: دهستان رشتخوار) is in the Central District of Roshtkhar County, Razavi Khorasan province, Iran. Its capital is the village of Hoseynabad-e Roshtkhar.

== Demographics ==
=== Population ===
At the time of the 2006 National Census, the rural district's population was 16,536 in 3,876 households. There were 17,054 inhabitants in 4,674 households at the following census of 2011. The 2016 census measured the population of the rural district as 16,440 in 4,952 households. The most populous of its 51 villages was Fathabad, with 2,823 people.

=== Other villages in the rural district ===
- Absabad
- Barakuh
- Fardaq
- Mehdiabad
- Nuq
- Qaderabad
- Saadatabad
- Zarghari
