= Chenarud-e Shomali Rural District =

Rural district in Isfahan province, Iran

Chenarud-e Shomali Rural District Persian: دهستان چنارود شمالي
- Rural District
- Location within Iran
- Coordinates: 32°41′N 50°22′E
- Country: Iran
- Province: Isfahan
- County: Chadegan
- District: Chenarud
- Established: 1987
- Capital: Faramushjan

Population (2016)
  - Total: 3,534
- Time zone: UTC+3:30 (IRST)

Chenarud-e Shomali Rural District (Persian: دهستان چنارود شمالي) is in Chenarud District of Chadegan County, Isfahan province, Iran. Its capital is the village of Faramushjan.

== Demographics ==
=== Population ===
At the time of the 2006 National Census, the rural district's population was 4,274 in 941 households. There were 3,973 inhabitants in 965 households at the following census of 2011. The 2016 census measured the population of the rural district as 3,534 in 985 households. The most populous of its 29 villages was Faramushjan, with 991 people.

=== Other villages in the rural district ===
- Cheshmandegan-e Majid
- Cheshmandegan-e Olya
- Cheshmandegan-e Sofla
- Darakabad
- Parmeh-ye Olya
- Parmeh-ye Sofla
- Varbad
