= Jangal District =

District in Razavi Khorasan province, Iran

Jangal District Persian: بخش جنگل
- District
- Location within Iran
- Coordinates: 34°48′N 59°20′E
- Country: Iran
- Province: Razavi Khorasan
- County: Roshtkhar
- Established: 2002
- Capital: Jangal

Population (2016)
  - Total: 14,342
- Time zone: UTC+3:30 (IRST)

Jangal District (Persian: بخش جنگل) is in Roshtkhar County, Razavi Khorasan province, Iran. Its capital is the city of Jangal.

== Demographics ==
=== Population ===
At the time of the 2006 National Census, the district's population was 14,626 in 3,298 households. The following census in 2011 counted 14,447 people in 3,660 households. The 2016 census measured the population of the district as 14,342 inhabitants in 3,855 households.

=== Administrative divisions ===
Jangal District Population
Administrative Divisions	2006	2011	2016
Jangal RD	5,066	5,126	5,311
Shabeh RD	3,328	2,831	2,381
Jangal (city)	6,232	6,490	6,650
Total	14,626	14,447	14,342
RD = Rural District
