= Chenarud District =

District in Isfahan province, Iran

Chenarud District Persian: بخش چنارود
- District
- Location within Iran
- Coordinates: 32°39′N 50°22′E
- Country: Iran
- Province: Isfahan
- County: Chadegan
- Established: 2002
- Capital: Owregan

Population (2016)
  - Total: 5,479
- Time zone: UTC+3:30 (IRST)

Chenarud District (Persian: بخش چنارود) is in Chadegan County, Isfahan province, Iran. Its capital is the village of Owregan.

== Demographics ==
=== Population ===
At the time of the 2006 National Census, the district's population was 6,925 in 1,511 households. The following census in 2011 counted 6,394 people in 1,664 households. The 2016 census measured the population of the district as 5,479 inhabitants in 1,548 households.

=== Administrative divisions ===
Chenarud District Population
Administrative Divisions	2006	2011	2016
Chenarud-e Jonubi RD	2,651	2,421	1,945
Chenarud-e Shomali RD	4,274	3,973	3,534
Total	6,925	6,394	5,479
RD = Rural District
