= Central District (Roshtkhar County) =

District in Razavi Khorasan province, Iran

Central District (Roshtkhar County) Persian: بخش مرکزی شهرستان رشتخوار
- District
- Location within Iran
- Coordinates: 35°01′N 59°34′E
- Country: Iran
- Province: Razavi Khorasan
- County: Roshtkhar
- Established: 2002
- Capital: Roshtkhar

Population (2016)
  - Total: 46,347
- Time zone: UTC+3:30 (IRST)

The Central District of Roshtkhar County (Persian: بخش مرکزی شهرستان رشتخوار) is in Razavi Khorasan province, Iran. Its capital is the city of Roshtkhar.

== Demographics ==
=== Population ===
At the time of the 2006 National Census, the district's population was 42,621 in 10,221 households. The following census in 2011 counted 46,185 people in 12,618 households. The 2016 census measured the population of the district as 46,347 inhabitants in 13,711 households.

=== Administrative divisions ===
Central District (Roshtkhar County) Population
Administrative Divisions	2006	2011	2016
Astaneh RD	20,962	22,445	22,393
Roshtkhar RD	16,536	17,054	16,440
Roshtkhar (city)	5,123	6,686	7,514
Total	42,621	46,185	46,347
RD = Rural District
