= Roshtkhar County =

County in Razavi Khorasan province, Iran

Roshtkhar County Persian: شهرستان رشتخوار
- County
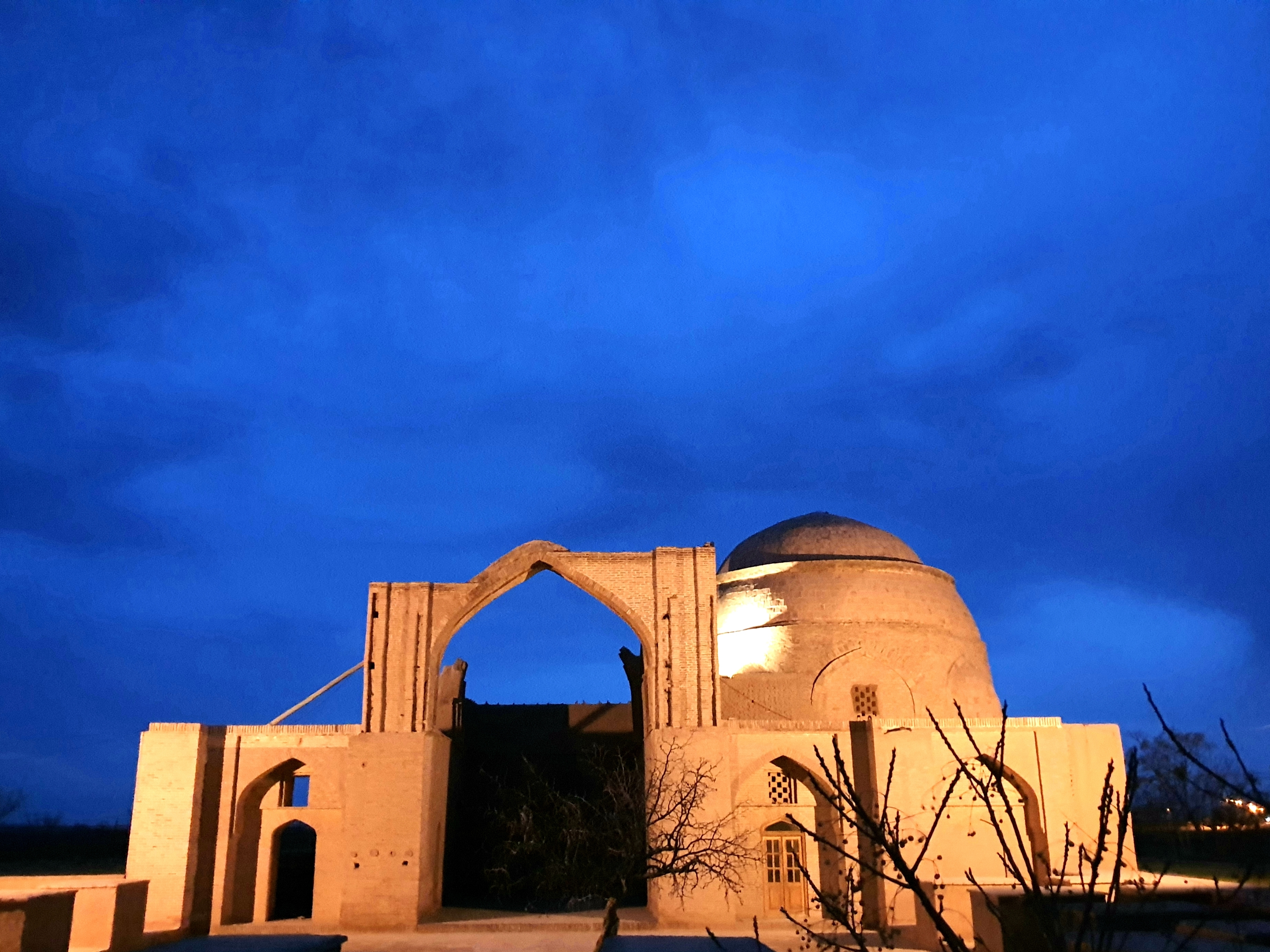
- Grand Mosque of Roshtkhar

- Location of Roshtkhar County in Razavi Khorasan province (bottom, purple)

- Location of Razavi Khorasan province in Iran
- Coordinates: 34°52′N 59°29′E
- Country: Iran
- Province: Razavi Khorasan
- Established: 2002
- Capital: Roshtkhar
- Districts: Central, Jangal

Area
  - Total: 3,598 km^{2} (1,389 sq mi)

Population (2016)
  - Total: 60,689
  - Density: 16.87/km^{2} (43.69/sq mi)
- Time zone: UTC+3:30 (IRST)

Roshtkhar County (Persian: شهرستان رشتخوار) is in Razavi Khorasan province, Iran. Its capital is the city of Roshtkhar.

== Demographics ==
=== Population ===
At the time of the 2006 National Census, the county's population was 57,247 in 13,519 households. The following census in 2011 counted 60,632 people in 16,262 households. The 2016 census measured the population of the county as 60,689 in 17,566 households.

=== Administrative divisions ===
Roshtkhar County's population history and administrative structure over three consecutive censuses are shown in the following table.

Roshtkhar County Population
Administrative Divisions	2006	2011	2016
Central District	42,621	46,185	46,347
Astaneh RD	20,962	22,445	22,393
Roshtkhar RD	16,536	17,054	16,440
Roshtkhar (city)	5,123	6,686	7,514
Jangal District	14,626	14,447	14,342
Jangal RD	5,066	5,126	5,311
Shabeh RD	3,328	2,831	2,381
Jangal (city)	6,232	6,490	6,650
Total	57,247	60,632	60,689
RD = Rural District

== See also ==
Media related to Roshtkhar County at Wikimedia Commons
