= Menderjan =

Neighborhood in Isfahan province, Iran

Menderjan Persian: مندرجان
- Neighborhood
- Location within Iran
- Coordinates: 32°45′54″N 50°36′18″E
- Country: Iran
- Province: Isfahan
- County: Chadegan
- District: Central
- City: Chadegan

Population (2006)
  - Total: 974
- Time zone: UTC+3:30 (IRST)

Menderjan (Persian: مندرجان) (Note: Also romanized as Menderjān) is a neighborhood in the city of Chadegan in the Central District of Chadegan County, Isfahan province, Iran.

== Demographics ==
=== Population ===
At the time of the 2006 National Census, Menderjan's population was 974 in 232 households, when it was a village in Kaveh Ahangar Rural District. After the census, the village was annexed by the city of Chadegan.
