= Darkan, Isfahan =

Village in Isfahan province, Iran

Darkan Persian: دركان
- Village
- Location within Iran
- Coordinates: 32°42′33″N 50°48′05″E
- Country: Iran
- Province: Isfahan
- County: Chadegan
- District: Central
- Rural District: Kabutarsorkh

Population (2016)
  - Total: 89
- Time zone: UTC+3:30 (IRST)

Darkan (Persian: دركان) (Note: Also romanized as Darakān, Darkān, and Derkān; also known as Deh Khān) is a village in Kabutarsorkh Rural District of the Central District in Chadegan County, Isfahan province, Iran.

== Demographics ==
=== Population ===
At the time of the 2006 National Census, the village's population was 62 in 18 households. The following census in 2011 counted 62 people in 24 households. The 2016 census measured the population of the village as 89 people in 29 households.
