= Mashhad-e Kaveh =

Village in Isfahan province, Iran

Mashhad-e Kaveh Persian: مشهد كاوه
- Village
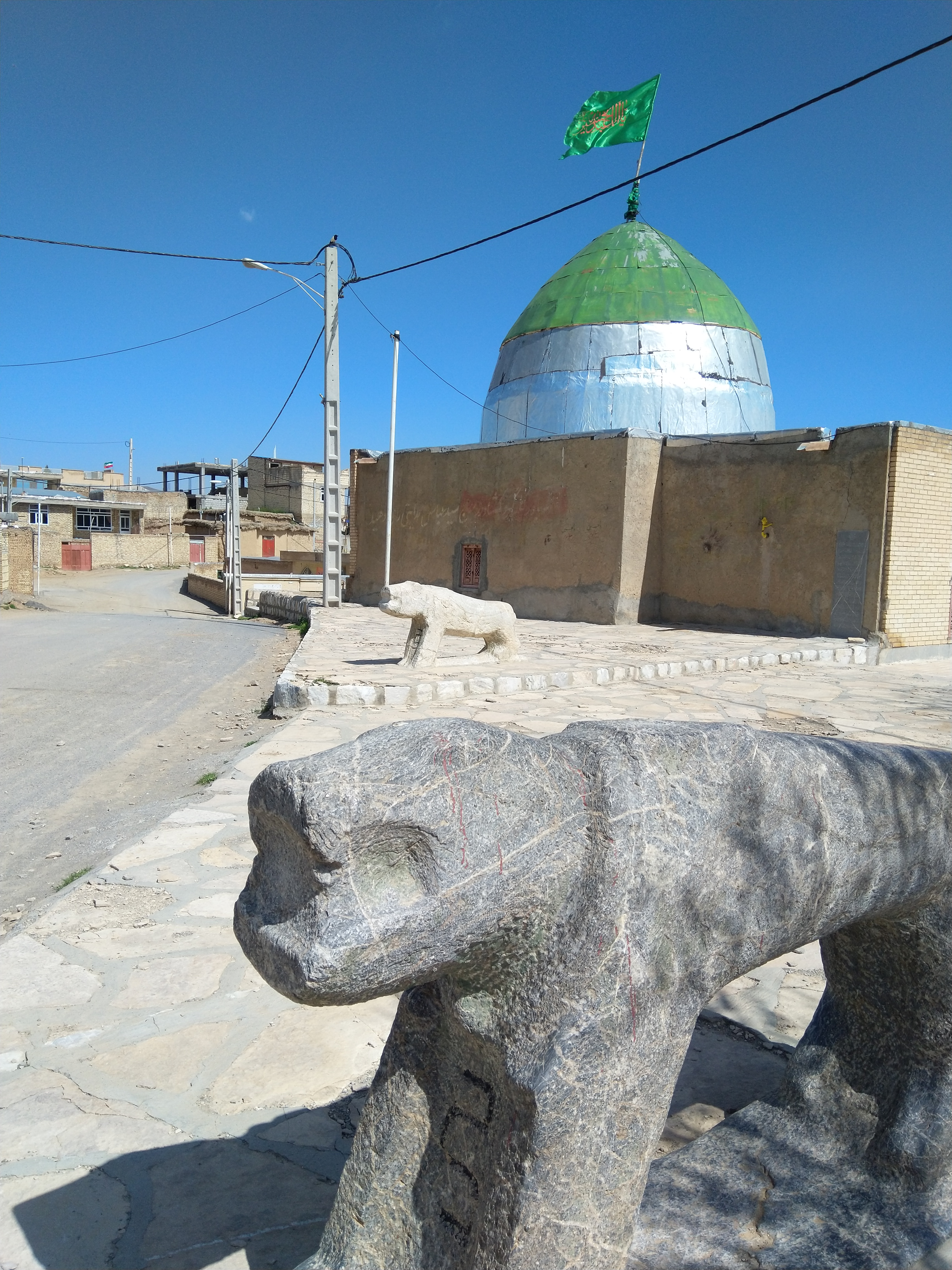
- Kaveh the Blacksmith's grave in Mashhad-e Kaveh

- Location within Iran
- Coordinates: 32°43′32″N 50°31′11″E
- Country: Iran
- Province: Isfahan
- County: Chadegan
- District: Central
- Rural District: Kaveh Ahangar

Population (2016)
  - Total: 2,975
- Time zone: UTC+3:30 (IRST)

Mashhad-e Kaveh (Persian: مشهد كاوه) (Note: Also romanized as Mashhad Kāveh and Mashhad-e Kāveh; also known as Mashhad) is a village in, and the capital of, Kaveh Ahangar Rural District in the Central District of Chadegan County, Isfahan province, Iran.

== Demographics ==
=== Population ===
At the time of the 2006 National Census, the village's population was 2,822 in 658 households. The following census in 2011 counted 3,012 people in 815 households. The 2016 census measured the population of the village as 2,975 people in 910 households. It was the most populous village in its rural district.

== Kaveh the Blacksmith ==
The Iranian hero and the myth Kaveh the Blacksmith is believed to originate from Mashhad-e Kaveh. It is believed he was born on January 12 some 5000 years ago. His birth certificate at his grave in Mashhad e Kaveh, is a poem from the Safavid dynasty era, indicating Kaveh’s birthday is two months and a week before the Nowrooz night, thus it must be January 12. His birthday is a celebration day for friendship and justice.
