= Mansuriyeh, Isfahan =

Village in Isfahan province, Iran

Mansuriyeh Persian: منصوريه
- Village
- Location within Iran
- Coordinates: 32°47′18″N 50°35′03″E
- Country: Iran
- Province: Isfahan
- County: Chadegan
- District: Central
- Rural District: Kabutarsorkh

Population (2016)
  - Total: 87
- Time zone: UTC+3:30 (IRST)

Mansuriyeh (Persian: منصوريه) (Note: Also romanized as Manşūrīyeh) is a village in Kabutarsorkh Rural District of the Central District in Chadegan County, Isfahan province, Iran.

== Demographics ==
=== Population ===
At the time of the 2006 National Census, the village's population was 113 in 31 households. The following census in 2011 counted 99 people in 31 households. The 2016 census measured the population of the village as 87 people in 27 households.
