= Hojjatabad, Chadegan =

Village in Isfahan province, Iran

Hojjatabad Persian: حجت‌آباد
- Village
- Location within Iran
- Coordinates: 32°42′59″N 50°47′51″E
- Country: Iran
- Province: Isfahan
- County: Chadegan
- District: Central
- Rural District: Kabutarsorkh

Population (2016)
  - Total: 891
- Time zone: UTC+3:30 (IRST)

Hojjatabad (Persian: حجت‌آباد) (Note: Also romanized as Ḩojjatābād) is a village in Kabutarsorkh Rural District of the Central District in Chadegan County, Isfahan province, Iran.

== Demographics ==
=== Population ===
At the time of the 2006 National Census, the village's population was 992 in 269 households. The following census in 2011 counted 982 people in 292 households. The 2016 census measured the population of the village as 891 people in 289 households.
