= Aliabad, Kaveh Ahangar =

Village in Isfahan province, Iran

Aliabad Persian: علي اباد
- Village
- Location within Iran
- Coordinates: 32°40′23″N 50°26′49″E
- Country: Iran
- Province: Isfahan
- County: Chadegan
- District: Central
- Rural District: Kaveh Ahangar

Population (2016)
  - Total: 1,317
- Time zone: UTC+3:30 (IRST)

Aliabad (Persian: علي اباد) (Note: Also romanized as ‘Alīābād) is a village in Kaveh Ahangar Rural District of the Central District in Chadegan County, Isfahan province, Iran.

== Demographics ==
=== Population ===
At the time of the 2006 National Census, the village's population was 1,319 in 337 households. The following census in 2011 counted 1,387 people in 389 households. The 2016 census measured the population of the village as 1,317 people in 387 households.
