= Marufabad =

Village in Isfahan province, Iran

Marufabad Persian: معروف اباد
- Village
- Location within Iran
- Coordinates: 32°52′34″N 50°37′35″E
- Country: Iran
- Province: Isfahan
- County: Chadegan
- District: Central
- Rural District: Kabutarsorkh

Population (2016)
  - Total: 485
- Time zone: UTC+3:30 (IRST)

Marufabad (Persian: معروف اباد) (Note: Also romanized as Ma‘rūfābād) is a village in Kabutarsorkh Rural District of the Central District in Chadegan County, Isfahan province, Iran.

== Demographics ==
=== Population ===
At the time of the 2006 National Census, the village's population was 545 in 134 households. The following census in 2011 counted 565 people in 163 households. The 2016 census measured the population of the village as 485 people in 154 households.
