= Zayandeh Rud Cultural and Recreational Village =

Village in Isfahan province, Iran

Zayandeh Rud Cultural and Recreational Village Persian: دهکده فرهنگي- تفريحي زاينده رود
- Village
- Location within Iran
- Coordinates: 32°45′14″N 50°39′37″E
- Country: Iran
- Province: Isfahan
- County: Chadegan
- District: Central
- Rural District: Kaveh Ahangar

Population (2016)
  - Total: 18
- Time zone: UTC+3:30 (IRST)

Zayandeh Rud Cultural and Recreational Village (Persian: دهکده فرهنگي- تفريحي زاينده رود) (Note: Romanized as Dehkadeh-ye Farhengī-ye Tafrīḩī-ye Zāyandeh Rūd) is a resort and abadi in Kaveh Ahangar Rural District of the Central District in Chadegan County, Isfahan province, Iran.

== Demographics ==
=== Population ===
At the time of the 2006 National Census, the resort's population was 52 in 15 households. The village did not appear in the following census of 2011. The 2016 census measured the population of the resort as 18 people in six households.

=== Resort ===
The resort was the first cultural and recreational resort in Iran. Construction of the site cost 300 billion tomans. In 2019 the resort was the scene of a long-running strike by workers requesting better conditions.
