= Abadchi =

Abadchi (Persian: آبادچي) may refer to:

- Abadchi-ye Olya
- Abadchi-ye Sofla
