= Qorqor =

Village in Isfahan province, Iran

Qorqor Persian: قرقر
- Village
- Location within Iran
- Coordinates: 32°52′56″N 50°36′53″E
- Country: Iran
- Province: Isfahan
- County: Chadegan
- District: Central
- Rural District: Kabutarsorkh

Population (2016)
  - Total: 608
- Time zone: UTC+3:30 (IRST)

Qorqor (Persian: قرقر) (Note: Also romanized as Qarqar; also known as Ghorghor) is a village in Kabutarsorkh Rural District of the Central District in Chadegan County, Isfahan province, Iran.

== Demographics ==
=== Population ===
At the time of the 2006 National Census, the village's population was 684 in 155 households. The following census in 2011 counted 695 people in 205 households. The 2016 census measured the population of the village as 608 people in 199 households.
