= Ali Arab, Isfahan =

Village in Isfahan province, Iran

Ali Arab Persian: علي عرب
- Village
- Location within Iran
- Coordinates: 32°51′32″N 50°39′22″E
- Country: Iran
- Province: Isfahan
- County: Chadegan
- District: Central
- Rural District: Kabutarsorkh

Population (2016)
  - Total: 1,248
- Time zone: UTC+3:30 (IRST)

Ali Arab (Persian: علي عرب) (Note: Also romanized as ‘Alī ‘Arab) is a village in Kabutarsorkh Rural District of the Central District in Chadegan County, Isfahan province, Iran.

== Demographics ==
=== Population ===
At the time of the 2006 National Census, the village's population was 1,023 in 217 households. The following census in 2011 counted 1,063 people in 297 households. The 2016 census measured the population of the village as 1,248 people in 349 households.
