= Deh Kalbali =

Village in Isfahan province, Iran

Deh Kalbali Persian: ده كلبعلي
- Village
- Location within Iran
- Coordinates: 32°49′46″N 50°42′24″E
- Country: Iran
- Province: Isfahan
- County: Chadegan
- District: Central
- Rural District: Kabutarsorkh

Population (2016)
  - Total: 251
- Time zone: UTC+3:30 (IRST)

Deh Kalbali (Persian: ده كلبعلي) (Note: Also romanized as Deh Kalb‘alī and Deh-e Kalb ‘Alī; also known as Kalb ‘Alī) is a village in Kabutarsorkh Rural District of the Central District in Chadegan County, Isfahan province, Iran.

== Demographics ==
=== Population ===
At the time of the 2006 National Census, the village's population was 275 in 93 households. The following census in 2011 counted 274 people in 100 households. The 2016 census measured the population of the village as 251 people in 96 households.
