= Analucheh =

Village in Isfahan province, Iran

Analucheh Persian: انالوچه
- Village
- Location within Iran
- Coordinates: 32°54′37″N 50°33′35″E
- Country: Iran
- Province: Isfahan
- County: Chadegan
- District: Central
- Rural District: Kabutarsorkh

Population (2016)
  - Total: 1,620
- Time zone: UTC+3:30 (IRST)

Analucheh (Persian: انالوچه) (Note: Also romanized as Anālūcheh; also known as Anālūjeh and Enālūjeh) is a village in Kabutarsorkh Rural District of the Central District in Chadegan County, Isfahan province, Iran.

== Demographics ==
=== Population ===
At the time of the 2006 National Census, the village's population was 1,813 in 470 households. The following census in 2011 counted 1,672 people in 536 households. The 2016 census measured the population of the village as 1,620 people in 566 households.
