= Komitak =

Village in Isfahan province, Iran

Komitak Persian: كميتك
- Village
- Location within Iran
- Coordinates: 32°43′13″N 50°27′33″E
- Country: Iran
- Province: Isfahan
- County: Chadegan
- District: Central
- Rural District: Kaveh Ahangar

Population (2016)
  - Total: 865
- Time zone: UTC+3:30 (IRST)

Komitak (Persian: كميتك) (Note: Also romanized as Komītak; also known as Kumītak) is a village in Kaveh Ahangar Rural District of the Central District in Chadegan County, Isfahan province, Iran.

== Demographics ==
=== Population ===
At the time of the 2006 National Census, the village's population was 716 in 186 households. The following census in 2011 counted 842 people in 233 households. The 2016 census measured the population of the village as 865 people in 246 households.
