= Marnan Bridge =

Historic bridge in Isfahan, Iran

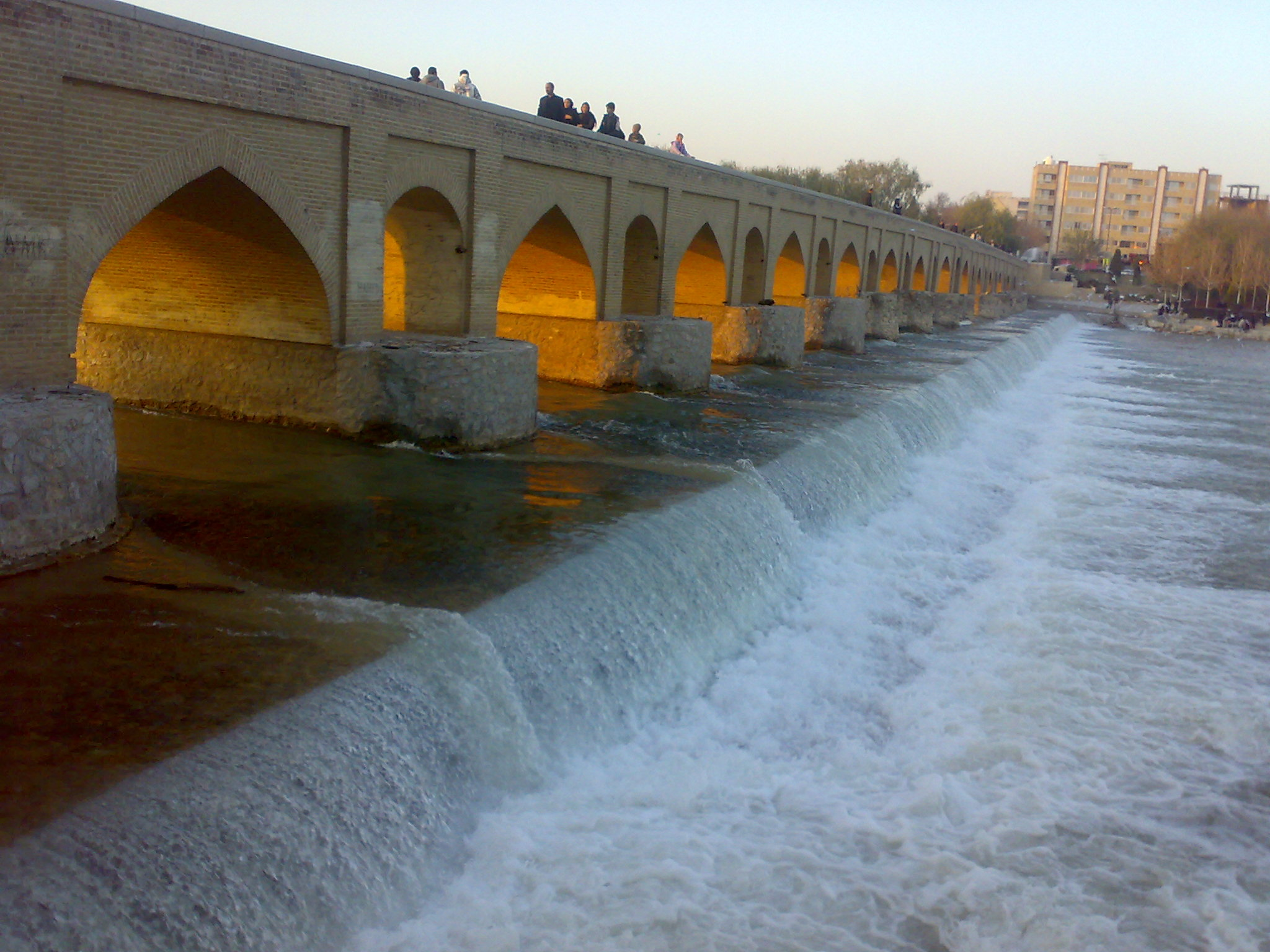
- The Eastern view of the bridge from south
- Coordinates: 32°38′29″N 51°38′36″E
- Crosses: Zayandeh River
- Locale: Isfahan, Iran

Characteristics
- Total length: 186 metres (610 ft)
- Width: 4.8 metres (16 ft)
- No. of spans: 17

Location
- Interactive map of Marnan Bridge

Marnan Bridge (Persian: پل مارنان) is a historic bridge in Isfahan, Iran. The current structure of the bridge dates back to the Safavid era, but its foundations are older and possibly as old as the Shahrestan Bridge, which dates back to the Sasanian era.
