= Abadchi-ye Sofla =

Neighborhood in Isfahan province, Iran

Abadchi-ye Sofla Persian: آبادچي سفلي
- Neighborhood
- Location within Iran
- Coordinates: 32°45′25″N 50°43′03″E
- Country: Iran
- Province: Isfahan
- County: Chadegan
- District: Central
- Rural District: Kabutarsorkh
- Village: Abadchi

Population (2006)
  - Total: 48
- Time zone: UTC+3:30 (IRST)

Abadchi-ye Sofla (Persian: آبادچي سفلي) (Note: Also romanized as Ābādchī-ye Soflá; also known as Ābādchī-ye Pā’īn) is a neighborhood in the village of Abadchi in Kabutarsorkh Rural District of the Central District in Chadegan County, Isfahan province, Iran.

== Demographics ==
=== Population ===
At the time of the 2006 National Census, Abadchi-ye Sofla's population was 48 in 11 households, when it was a village in Kabutarsorkh Rural District. After the census, the village merged with the village of Abadchi-ye Olya, which was renamed Abadchi.
