= Abadchi, Iran =

Village in Isfahan province, Iran

Abadchi Persian: ابادچي
- Village
- Location within Iran
- Coordinates: 33°51′14″N 59°50′00″E
- Country: Iran
- Province: Isfahan
- County: Chadegan
- District: Central
- Rural District: Kabutarsorkh

Population (2016)
  - Total: 225
- Time zone: UTC+3:30 (IRST)

Abadchi (Persian: ابادچي) (Note: Also romanized as Ābādchī; formerly known as Abadchi-ye Olya (ابادچي عليا), also romanized as Ābādchī-ye 'Olyā; also known as Ābādchī-ye Bālā) is a village in Kabutarsorkh Rural District of the Central District in Chadegan County, Isfahan province, Iran.

== Demographics ==
=== Population ===
At the time of the 2006 National Census, the village's population, as Abadchi-ye Olya, was 279 in 77 households. The following census in 2011 counted 318 people in 99 households, by which time it had merged with the village of Abadchi-ye Sofla and was renamed Abadchi. The 2016 census measured the population of the village as 225 people in 74 households.
