= Kaveh Ahangar Rural District =

Rural district in Isfahan province, Iran

Kaveh Ahangar Rural District Persian: دهستان كاوه آهنگر
- Rural District
- Location within Iran
- Coordinates: 32°45′N 50°32′E
- Country: Iran
- Province: Isfahan
- County: Chadegan
- District: Central
- Established: 2002
- Capital: Mashhad-e Kaveh

Population (2016)
  - Total: 5,256
- Time zone: UTC+3:30 (IRST)

Kaveh Ahangar Rural District (Persian: دهستان كاوه آهنگر) is in the Central District of Chadegan County, Isfahan province, Iran. Its capital is the village of Mashhad-e Kaveh.

== Demographics ==
=== Population ===
At the time of the 2006 National Census, the rural district's population was 5,884 in 1,429 households. There were 5,285 inhabitants in 1,449 households at the following census of 2011. The 2016 census measured the population of the rural district as 5,256 in 1,580 households. The most populous of its 14 villages was Mashhad-e Kaveh, with 2,975 people.

=== Other villages in the rural district ===
- Aliabad
- Komitak
- Zayandeh Rud Cultural and Recreational Village

== See also ==
- Menderjan, a former village and now a neighborhood in the city of Chadegan
