= Geshnizgan =

Geshnizgan (Persian: گشنيزگان) may refer to:

- Geshnizgan, Chaharmahal and Bakhtiari
- Geshnizgan, Isfahan
