= Kabutarsorkh Rural District =

Rural district in Isfahan province, Iran

Kabutarsorkh Rural District Persian: دهستان كبوترسرخ
- Rural District
- Location within Iran
- Coordinates: 32°49′N 50°39′E
- Country: Iran
- Province: Isfahan
- County: Chadegan
- District: Central
- Established: 1987
- Capital: Rozveh

Population (2016)
  - Total: 7,488
- Time zone: UTC+3:30 (IRST)

Kabutarsorkh Rural District (Persian: دهستان كبوترسرخ) is in the Central District of Chadegan County, Isfahan province, Iran. It is administered from the city of Rozveh.

== Demographics ==
=== Population ===
At the time of the 2006 National Census, the rural district's population was 8,922 in 2,204 households. There were 7,989 inhabitants in 2,391 households at the following census of 2011. The 2016 census measured the population of the rural district as 7,488 in 2,427 households. The most populous of its 29 villages was Geshniz Jan, with 1,982 people.

=== Other villages in the rural district ===
- Abadchi
- Ali Arab
- Analucheh
- Darkan
- Deh Kalbali
- Hojjatabad
- Mansuriyeh
- Marufabad
- Qorqor

== See also ==
- Abadchi-ye Sofla, a former village and now a neighborhood in the village of Abadchi
- Samandegan, a former village and now a neighborhood in the city of Chadegan
