= Water and Soil Engineering Corporation =

Iranian government national state enterprise

Water and Soil Engineering Corporation is an Iranian government national state enterprise that manages transportation infrastructure construction, water transfer programs. It is partly privatized.It was started in 1990. It is part of Farming services national corporation of Ministry of Agriculture Jihad and Ministry of Energy.

== Projects ==
- Borujen, Ben water supply
- Water transfer to central Iranian plateau
- Isfahan Metro
