= Geshniz Jan =

Village in Isfahan province, Iran

Geshniz Jan Persian: گشنيزجان
- Village
- Location within Iran
- Coordinates: 32°46′35″N 50°27′57″E
- Country: Iran
- Province: Isfahan
- County: Chadegan
- District: Central
- Rural District: Kabutarsorkh

Population (2016)
  - Total: 1,982
- Time zone: UTC+3:30 (IRST)

Geshniz Jan (Persian: گشنيزجان) (Note: Also romanized as Geshnīz Jān; also known as Geshnīgān, Geshnīzgān, Gīshnegūn, Kashnegūn, and Kashnīgān) is a village in Kabutarsorkh Rural District of the Central District in Chadegan County, Isfahan province, Iran.

== Demographics ==
=== Population ===
At the time of the 2006 National Census, the village's population was 2,299 in 540 households. The following census in 2011 counted 2,172 people in 617 households. The 2016 census measured the population of the village as 1,982 people in 643 households, the most populous in its rural district.
