= Zayanderud =

Coordinates: 32°15′45″N 52°54′30″E

Zayandeh River
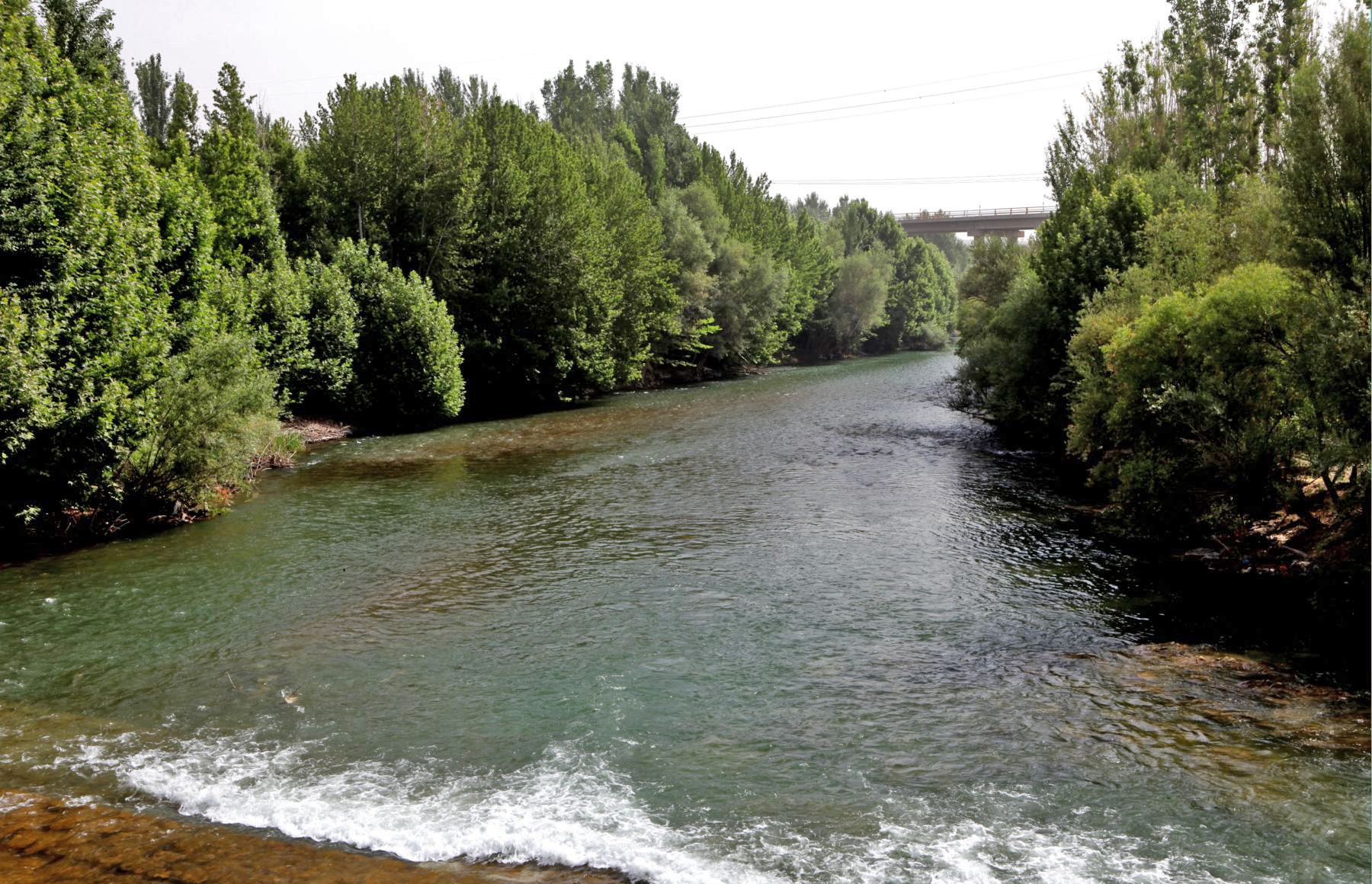
- Zayandeh Rud
- Native name: Zayandehrud (Persian)

Location
- Country: Iran

Physical characteristics
- Source
  - location: Zagros Mountains
  - elevation: 3,974 m (13,038 ft)
- Mouth
  - location: Gavkhouni (endorheic)
  - elevation: 1,466 m (4,810 ft)
- Length: 400 km (249 mi)
- Basin size: 41,500 km^{2} (16,020 sq mi)
- Discharge
  - average: 38 m^{3}/s (1,300 cu ft/s)

Ramsar Wetland
- Official name: Gavkhouni Lake and marshes of the lower Zaindeh Rud
- Designated: 23 June 1975
- Reference no.: 53

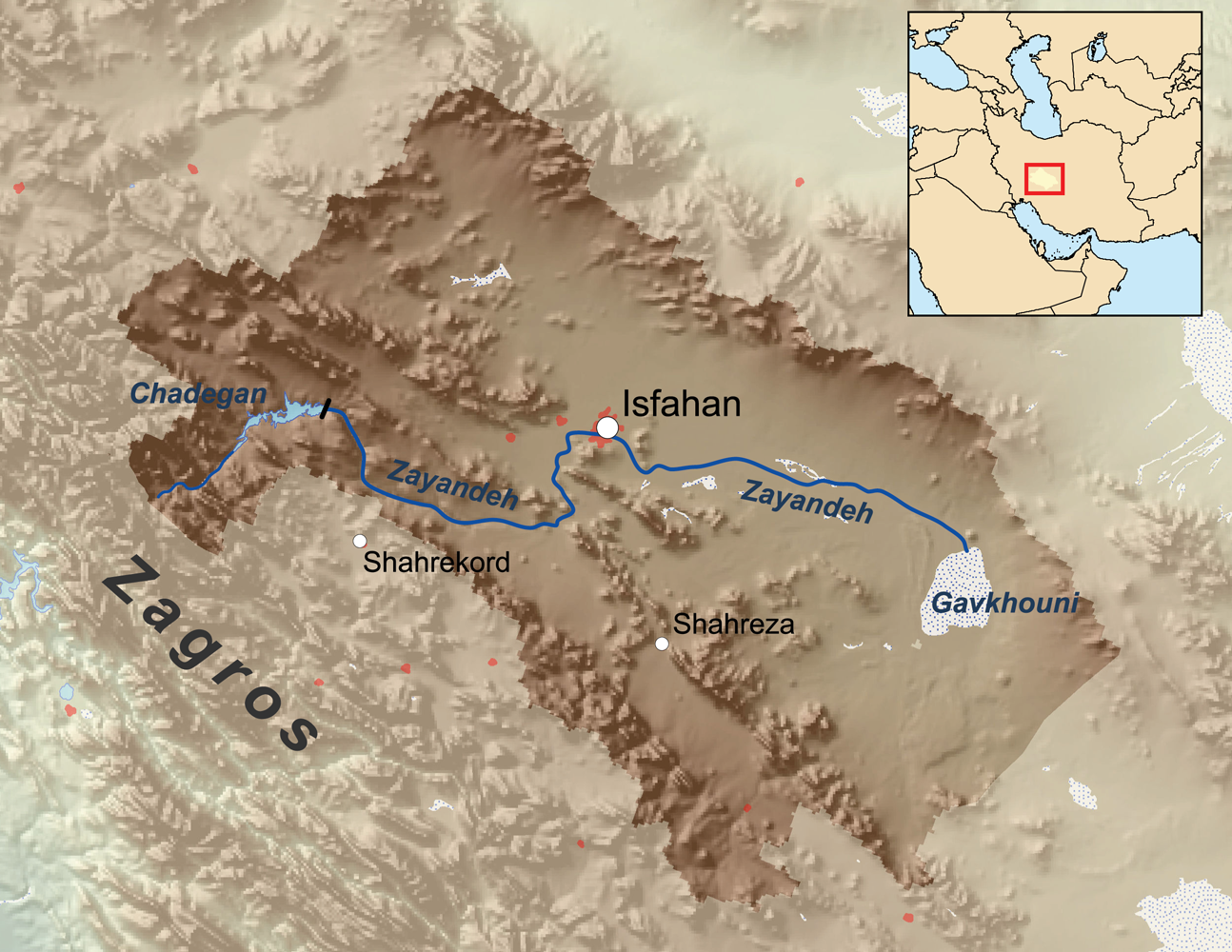
Map of the Zayandeh river and the Zayandeh/Gavkhouni drainage basin

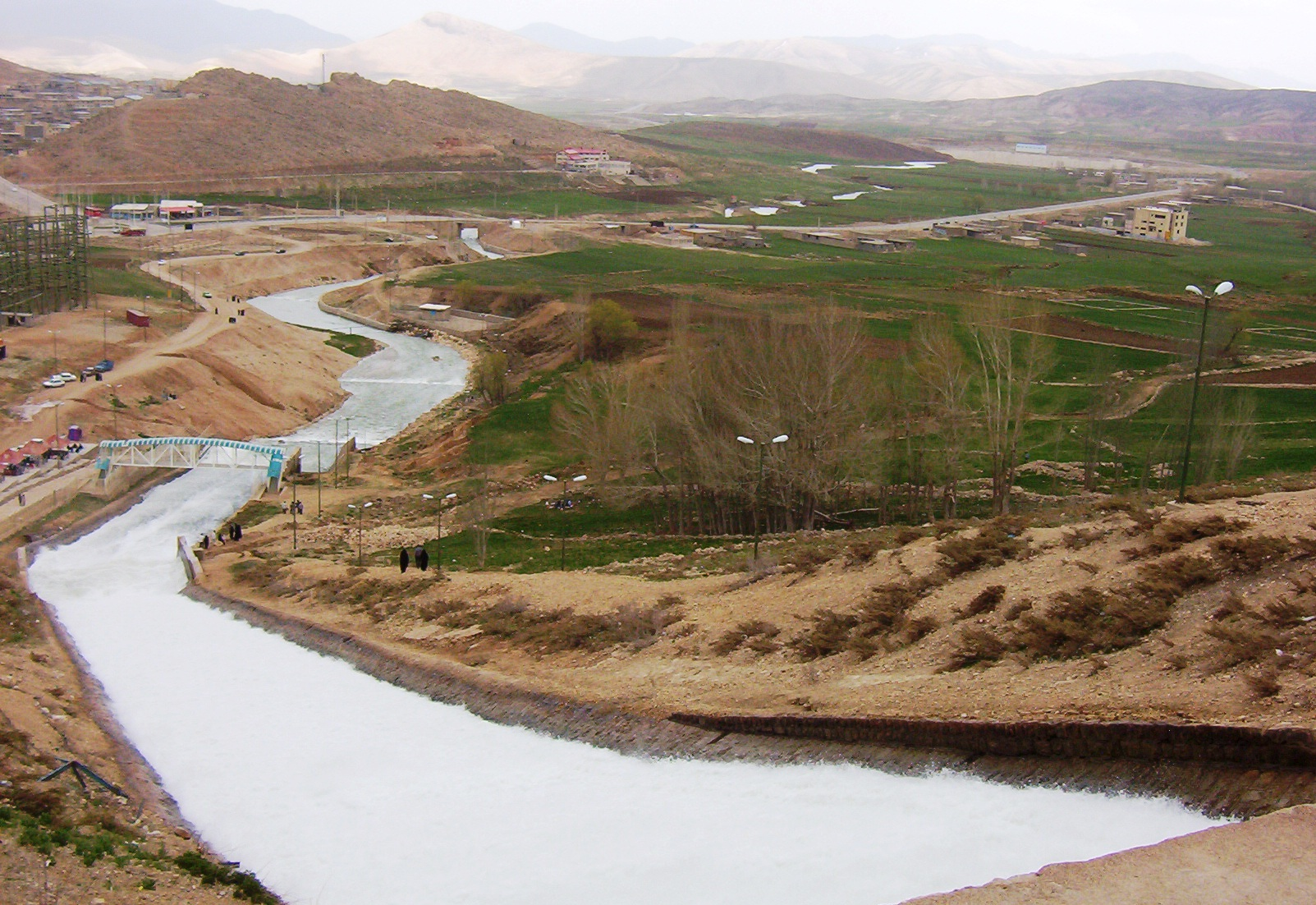
The Origin of Zayanderud, Koohrang tunnel extracts water from inside the Zagros Mountains.

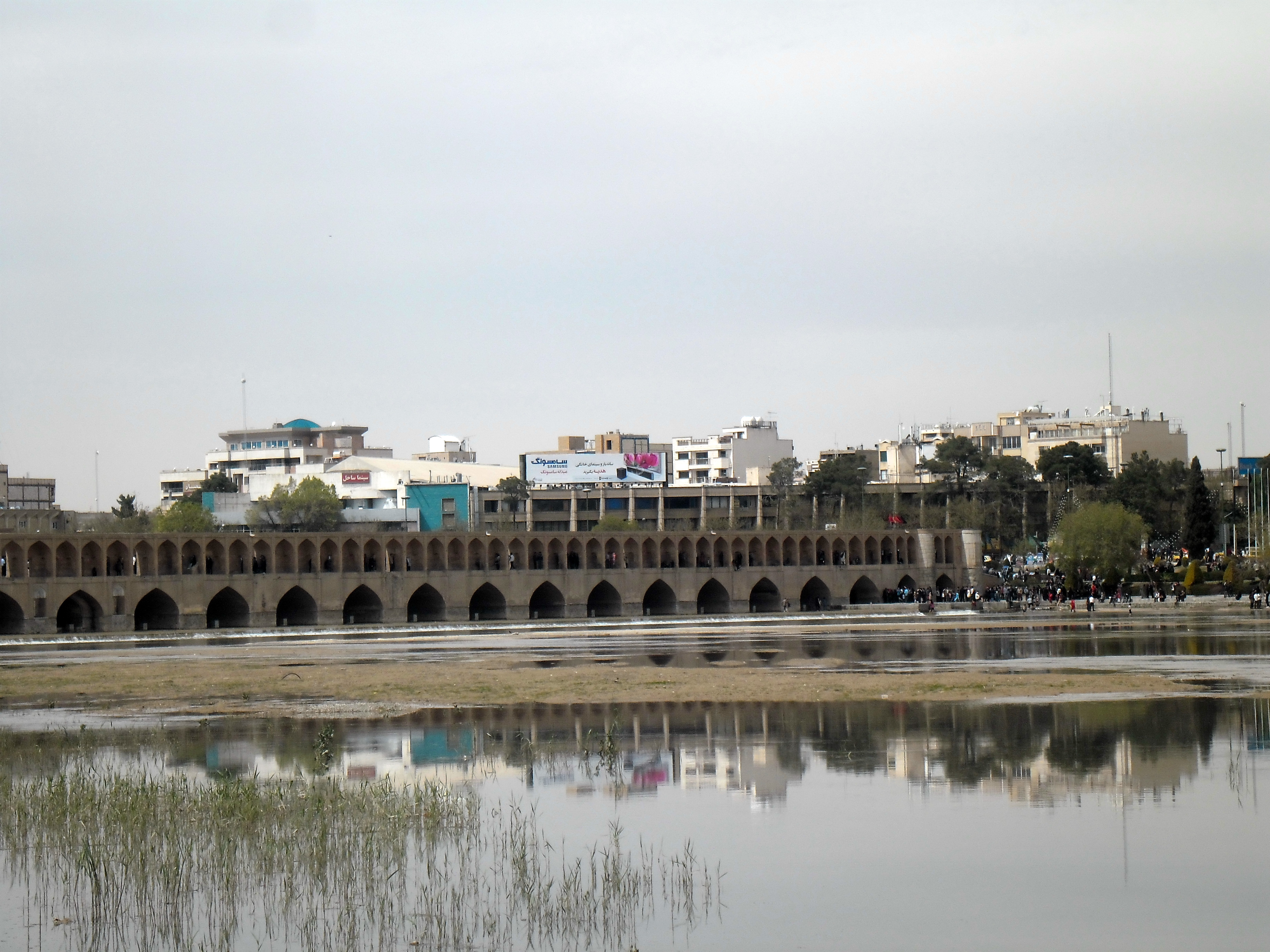
Zayanderud, summer 2015

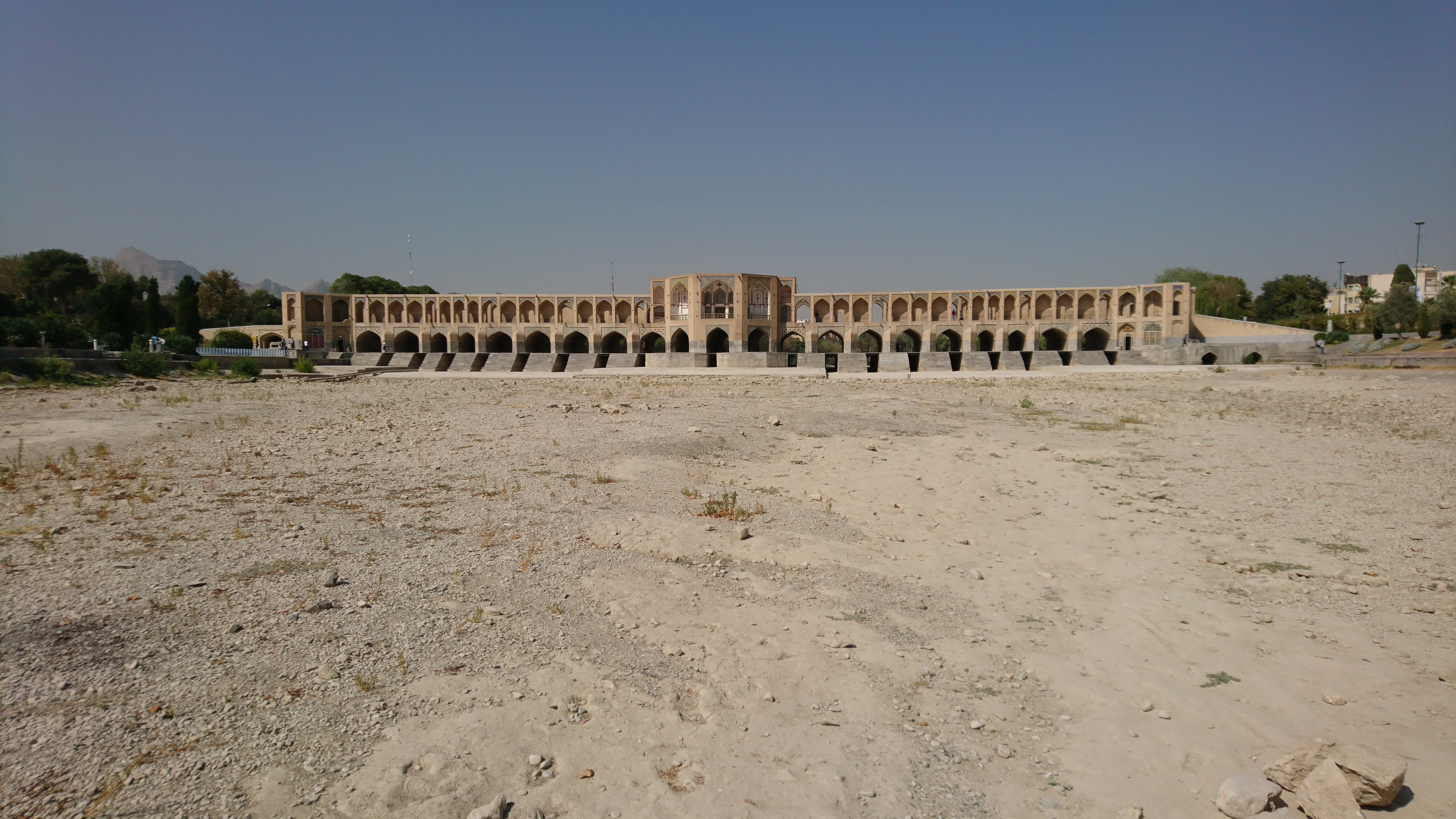
Zayanderuz, summer 2018

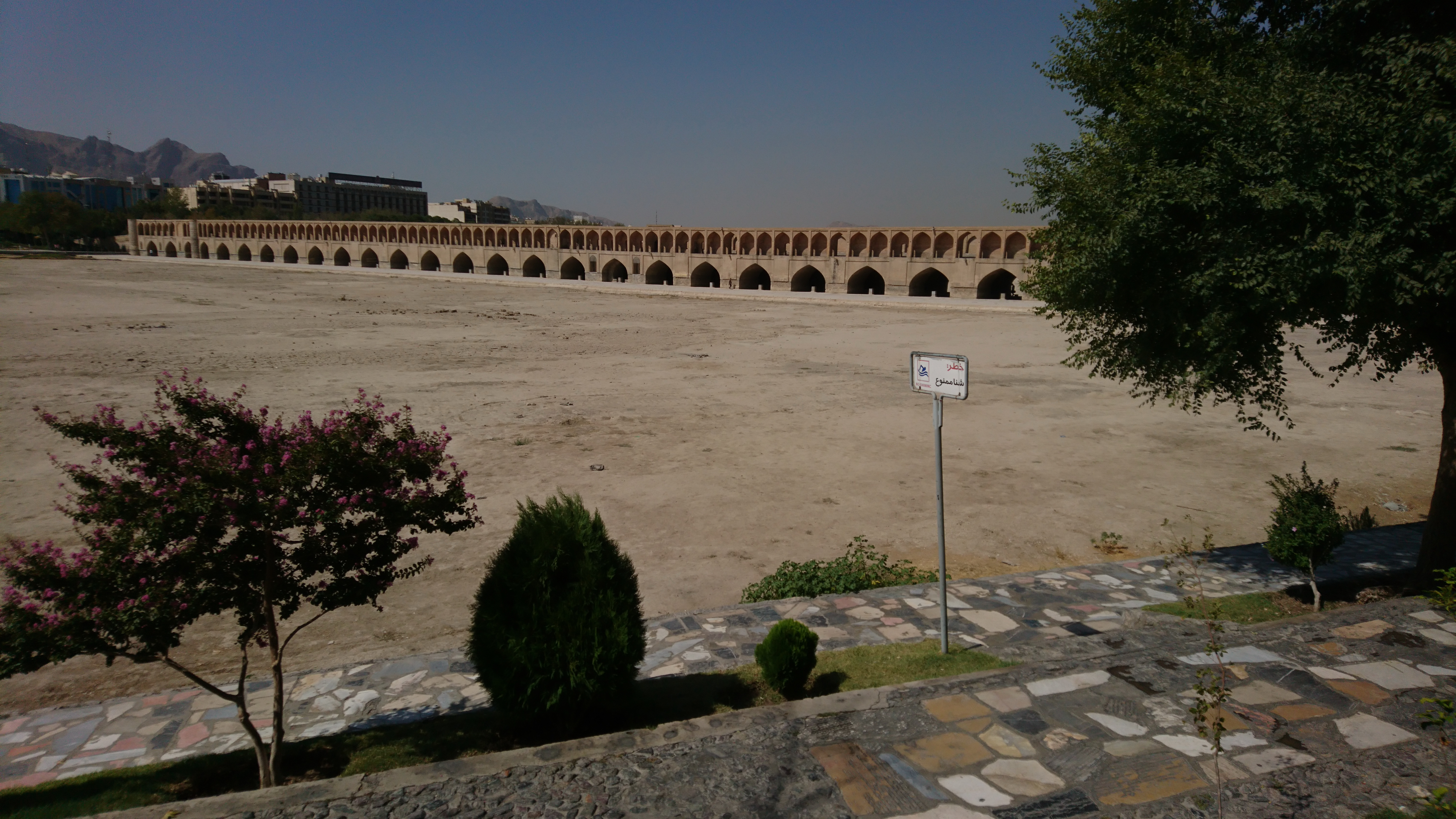
Zayanderud, 2018

The Zayanderud or Zayandehrud (Persian: Zāyanderūd ,زاینده‌رود; from زاینده [zɑːjændɛ] "fertile" or "life-giver", and رود [rʊːd] "river"), also spelled as Zayanderud or Zayanderood, ..., is the largest river of the Iranian Plateau in central Iran.

== Geography ==
The Zayandeh starts in the Zard-Kuh subrange of the Zagros Mountains in Chaharmahal and Bakhtiari Province. It flows 400 kilometres (249 mi) eastward before ending in the Gavkhouni swamp, a seasonal salt lake, southeast of Isfahan (Esfahan) city.

The Zayandeh used to have significant flow all year long, unlike many of Iran's rivers which are seasonal, but today it runs dry due to water extraction before reaching the city of Esfahan. In the early 2010s, the lower reaches of the river dried out completely after several years of seasonal dry-outs.

The Zayandeh River basin has an area of 41,500 square kilometres (16,000 sq mi), an altitude from 3,974 metres (13,038 ft) to 1,466 metres (4,810 ft), an average rain fall of 130 millimetres (5 in) and a monthly average temperature of 3 °C (37 °F) to 29 °C (84 °F). There are 2,700 square kilometres (1,000 sq mi) of irrigated land in the Zayandeh River basin, with water derived from the nine main hydraulic units of the Zayandeh River, wells, qanat and springs in lateral valleys. Zayandeh River water gave life to the people of central Iran mainly in Isfahan and Yazd provinces. Before the drying-out, water diverted per person was 240 litres (63 US gallons/53 imp gallons) per day in urban areas and 150 litres (40 US gallons/33 imp gallons) per day in villages. In the 1970s, the flow of the river was estimated at 1.2 cubic kilometres (0.3 cu mi) per annum, or 38 cubic metres (1,340 cu ft) per second.

== History ==
People have lived on the banks of the Zayandeh for thousands of years. An ancient prehistoric culture, the Zayandeh River Culture, flourished along the banks of the Zayandeh in the 6th Millennium BC. The Zayandeh crosses the city of Isfahan, Iran. In the 17th century, Baha al-Din al-Amili, a scholar and adviser to the Safavid dynasty, designed and built a system of canals (maadi), to distribute Zayandeh water to Isfahan's suburbs. The Zayandeh riverbed is spanned by Safavid era bridges, and the river used to flow through parks.

American archaeologists and historians of Persian art, Arthur Upham Pope and his wife Phyllis Ackerman are buried in a small mausoleum on the river bank. Richard N. Frye (an American scholar of Iranian and Central Asian Studies) has also requested to be buried there.

== Water use and division ==
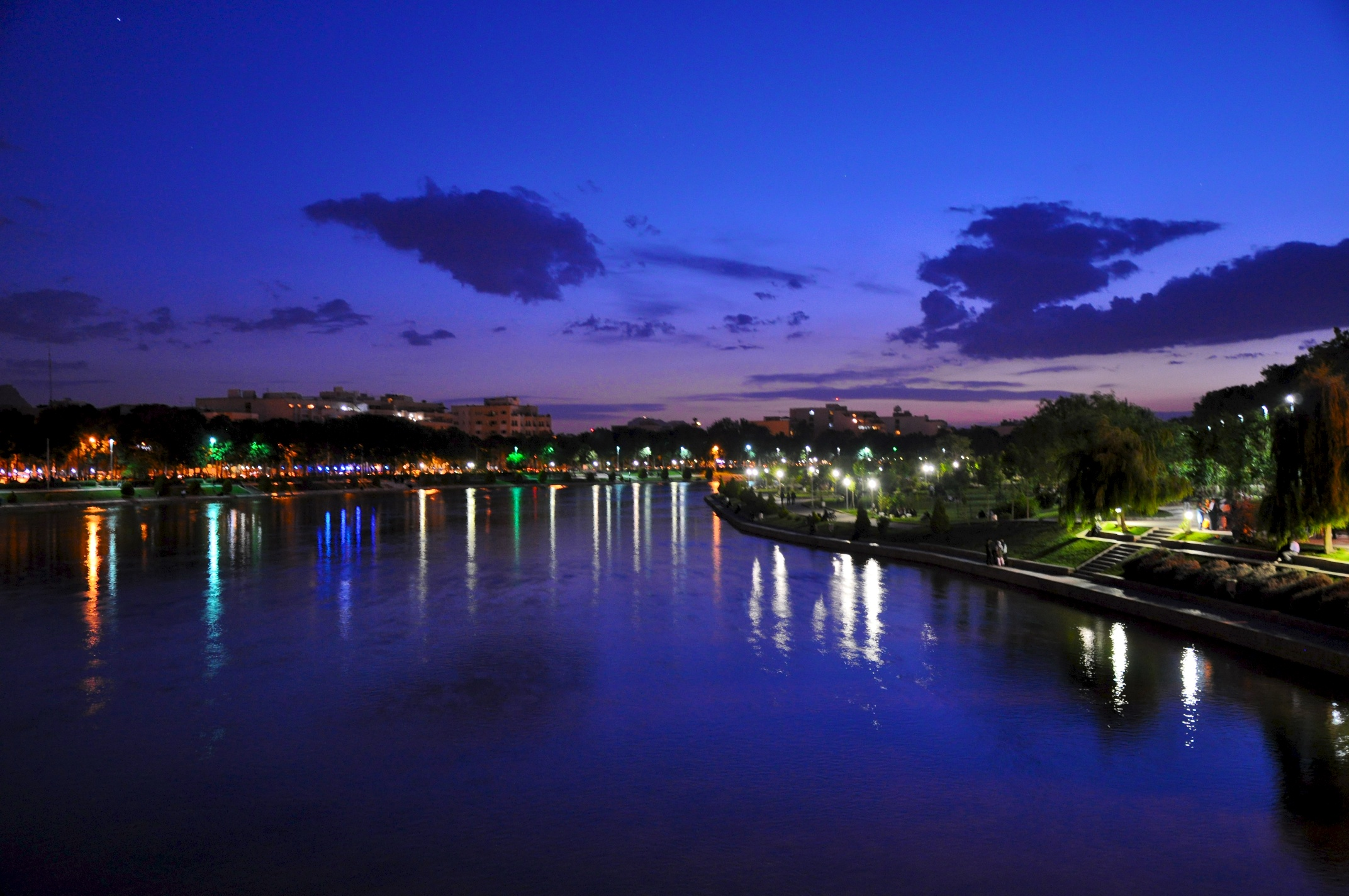
Zayanderud after sunset

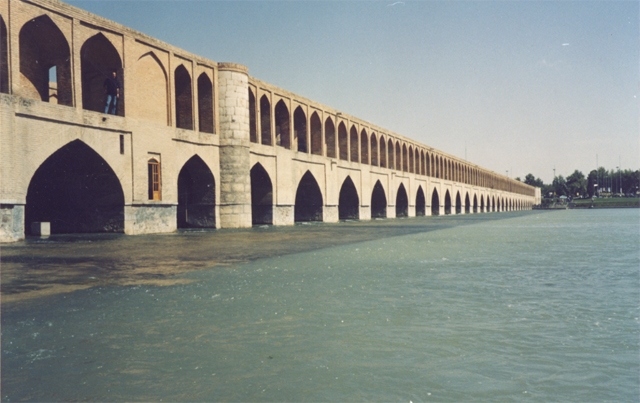
Zayanderud as it passes under Si-o-se-pol in Isfahan.

Until the 1960s in Isfahan Province the distribution of water followed the Tomar, a document claimed to date from the 16th Century. The Tomar divided the flow of the Zayandeh River into 33 parts which were then specifically allotted to the eight major districts within the region. At the district level the water flow was divided either on a time basis, or by the use of variable weirs, so that the proportion could be maintained regardless of the height of the flow.

For centuries Isfahan city had been an oasis settlement, noted for its surrounding fertile lands and prosperity. Until the 1960s industrial demand for water was minimal, which enabled the scarce water resources to be utilized primarily for agriculture. With a growing population within the basin, and rising standards of living particularly within the city, the pressure on water resources steadily increased until the division of water Tomar was no longer feasible. The creation of large steel works and other new industries demanded water.

The Chadegan Reservoir dam project in 1972 was a major hydroelectric project to help with stabilizing water flow and generating electricity. The dam was initially named Shah Abbas Dam after Shah Abbas I, the most influential king of the Safavid dynasty, but it was changed to Zayandeh Dam after the Islamic revolution in 1979. Since 1972, the Chadegan Reservoir has helped prevent seasonal flooding of the Zayandeh River.

80% of the Zayandeh's extracted water is used for agriculture, 10% for human consumption (drinking and domestic needs of a population of 4.5 million), 7% for industry (like the Zobahan-e-Esfahan and Foolad Mobarekeh steel companies and Isfahan's petrochemical, refinery and power plants) and 3% for other uses. There have been a number of tunnel projects (Koohrang) to redirect water from the Karun River (Iran's largest river that also starts in the Zagros Mountains), to the Zayandeh. These have helped provide water for the growing population and new industries in both Isfahan and Yazd provinces.

While the drying-out of the lower reaches of the Zayandeh River has been attributed to drought, the main reasons are man-made. Poor planning and populist politics have led to years of mismanagement and overuse which resulted in seasonal dry-outs and ultimately caused the river to dry out completely before reaching Isfahan.

== Drying up of Zayandehroud river ==
Zayandehroud River lost its permanent flow since 2006 and the people and farmers of this city faced a water shortage crisis. In addition to the lack of water due to the lack of snow and rain, the main reasons for the drying up of Zayandehroud are related to human errors, which can be summarized in the following cases:

Converting 180,000 hectares of natural resource pastures into gardens upstream of the Zayandehroud River in Chaharmahal and Bakhtiari province and Faridan region.

Creating structural dams and reservoirs for the development of agriculture in the mirage of the watershed. Establishment of large industries such as Isfahan Iron Smelter, Isfahan Oil Refinery, Isfahan Petrochemical, Chemical Industries, Mobarakeh Steel Company, Sepahan Oil Company and many industries that use a lot of water, such as power plants, etc., on the banks of Zayandeh River.

The dryness of the river has caused hundreds of thousands of residents down the river to become unemployed and has led to their seasonal or complete migration to other provinces or the city of Isfahan. This has caused a lot of damage to the farmers, so that during these years the farmers of Isfahan have rioted and protested at different times.

== Closing the river and rerouting ==
As of November 2023 a water supply tunnel Kohrang has been under development by Iranian government for more than 20 years.

The government Minister of Energy said the river would be opened five years from 2024. In 2015 the government promised to fully open the river in 2018 then in 2021 promised to do it in 2023. The government had reallocated the water from the river to other provinces cities and industries from 1980s. A database for water share allocating had been proposed.

== Projects ==
Borujen, Ben water supply working water project development that had been previously blocked by government

== Bridges ==
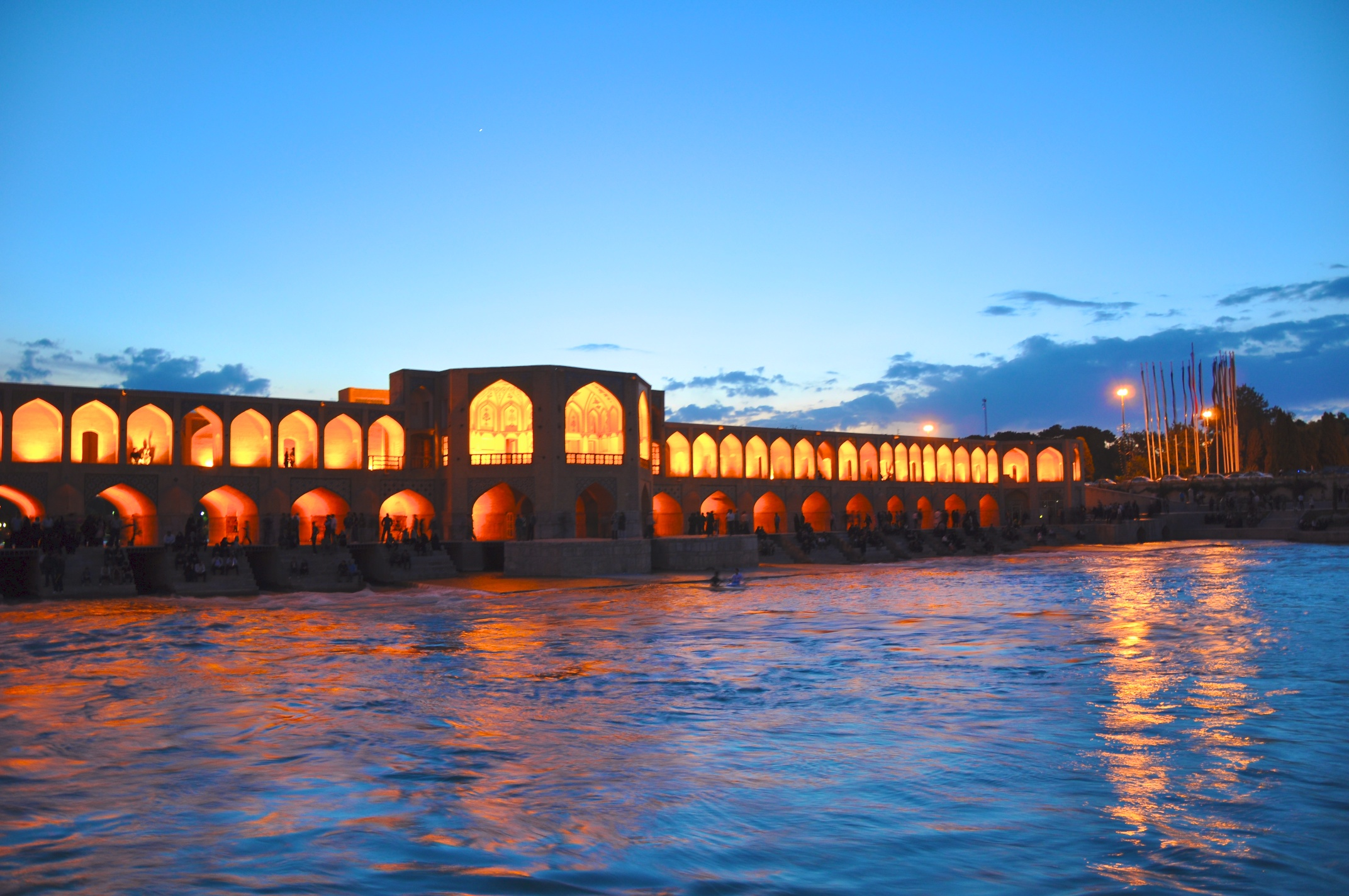
Khajou Bridge

There are several new and old bridges (pol) over the Zayandeh River.

Bridges on Zayandeh River in City of Esfahan:

- Marnan Bridge Built in 1599 (pedestrian)
- Vahid Bridge Built in 1976
- Vahid Bridge II Built in 2007
- Felezi Bridge Built in the 1950s
- Azar Bridge Built in 1976
- Si-o-se-pol Built in 1632 (pedestrian)
- Ferdowsi Bridge Built in the 1980s
- Joubi Bridge Built in the 17th century (pedestrian)
- Khaju Bridge Built in 1650 (pedestrian)
- Bozorgmehr Bridge Built in the 1970s
- Ghadir Bridge Built in 2000
- Shahrestan Bridge Built in the 11th century (foundations back to the 5th century AD) (pedestrian)

== Recreation ==
In the section of the Zayandeh River crossing Esfahan, bridges, parks, paddle boats and traditional cafes and restaurants amongst the rest of Esfahan rich cultural heritage, are major tourist attractions for Iranian as well as international visitors.
