= Joubi Bridge =

Historic bridge in Isfahan, Iran

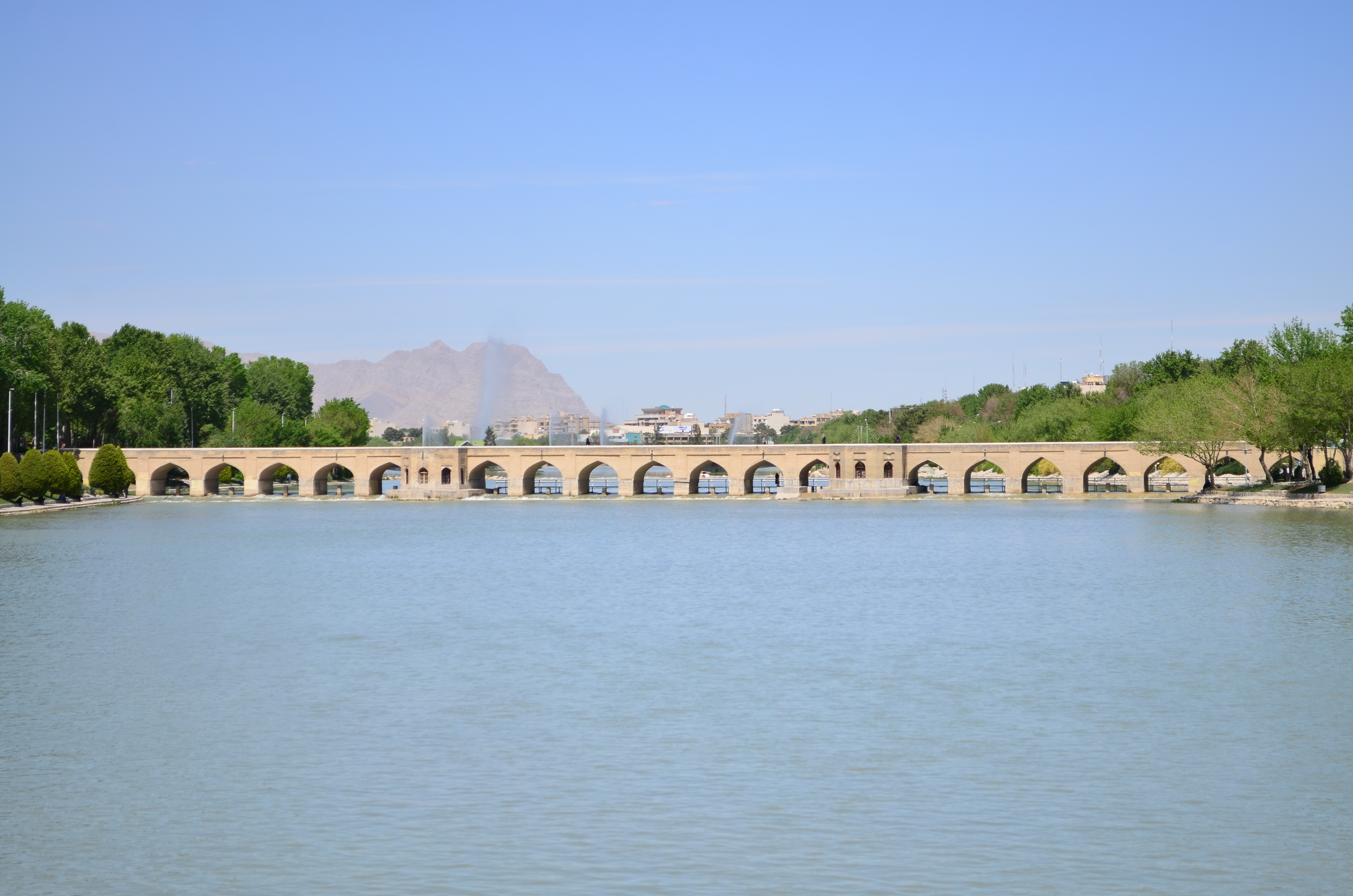
- Joubi Bridge in 2015
- Coordinates: 32°38′17″N 51°40′39″E

Characteristics
- Total length: 147 meters
- Width: 4 meters

Location
- Interactive map of Joubi Bridge

Joubi Bridge (Persian: پل جوبی), also called the Choobi Bridge, is a bridge over the Zayanderud in Isfahan, Iran. It was built in 1655, during the Safavid era.

The Joui Bridge is located between Khaju and Ferdowsi bridges. It is 147 meters long and 4 meters wide, with 21 arches. It was built during the reign of Shah Abbas II to irrigate and connect the Shah's gardens on both sides of the river.

== Gallery ==
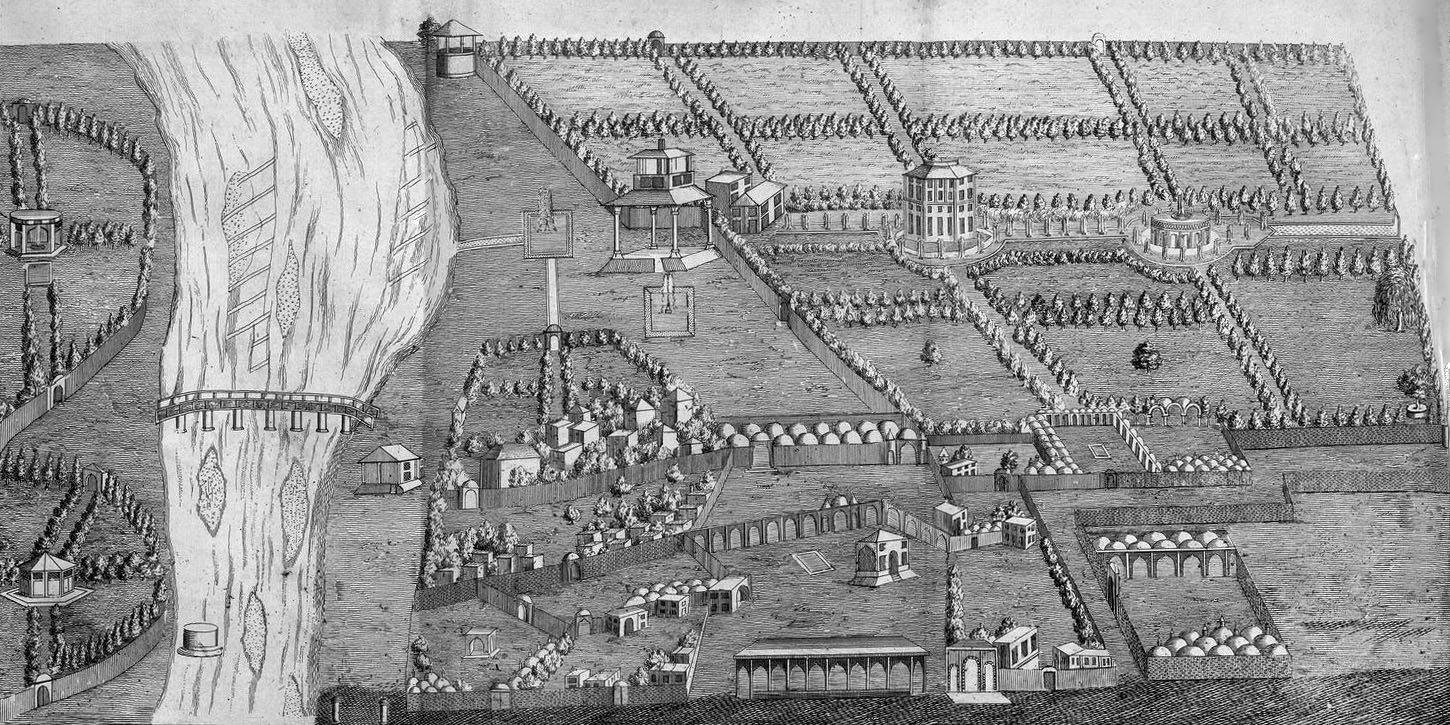
Joubi bridge visible in a map of Isfahan by Jean Chardin, 1670s

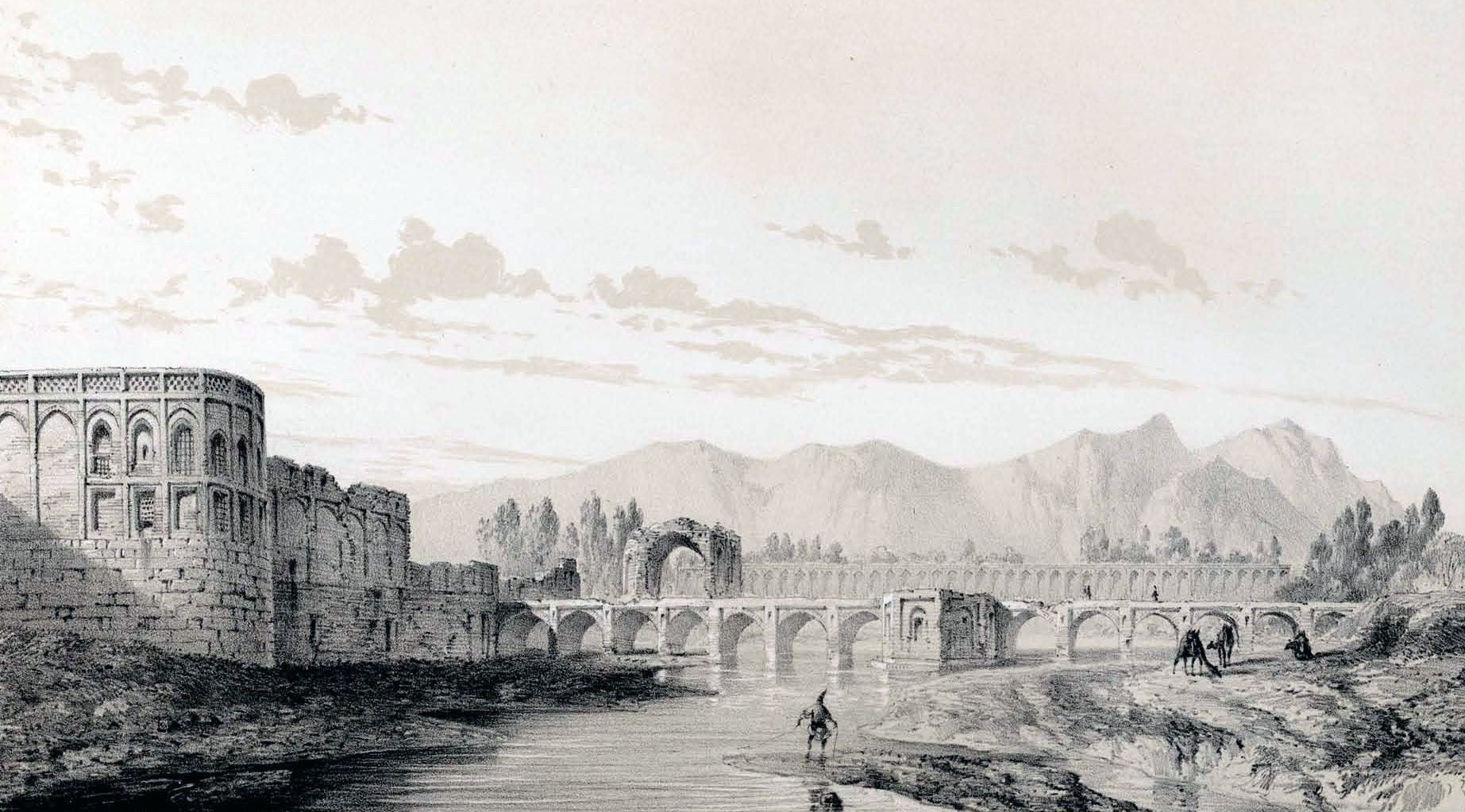
Joubi bridge and the now demolished Haft Dast Palace by Eugène Flandin, 1840

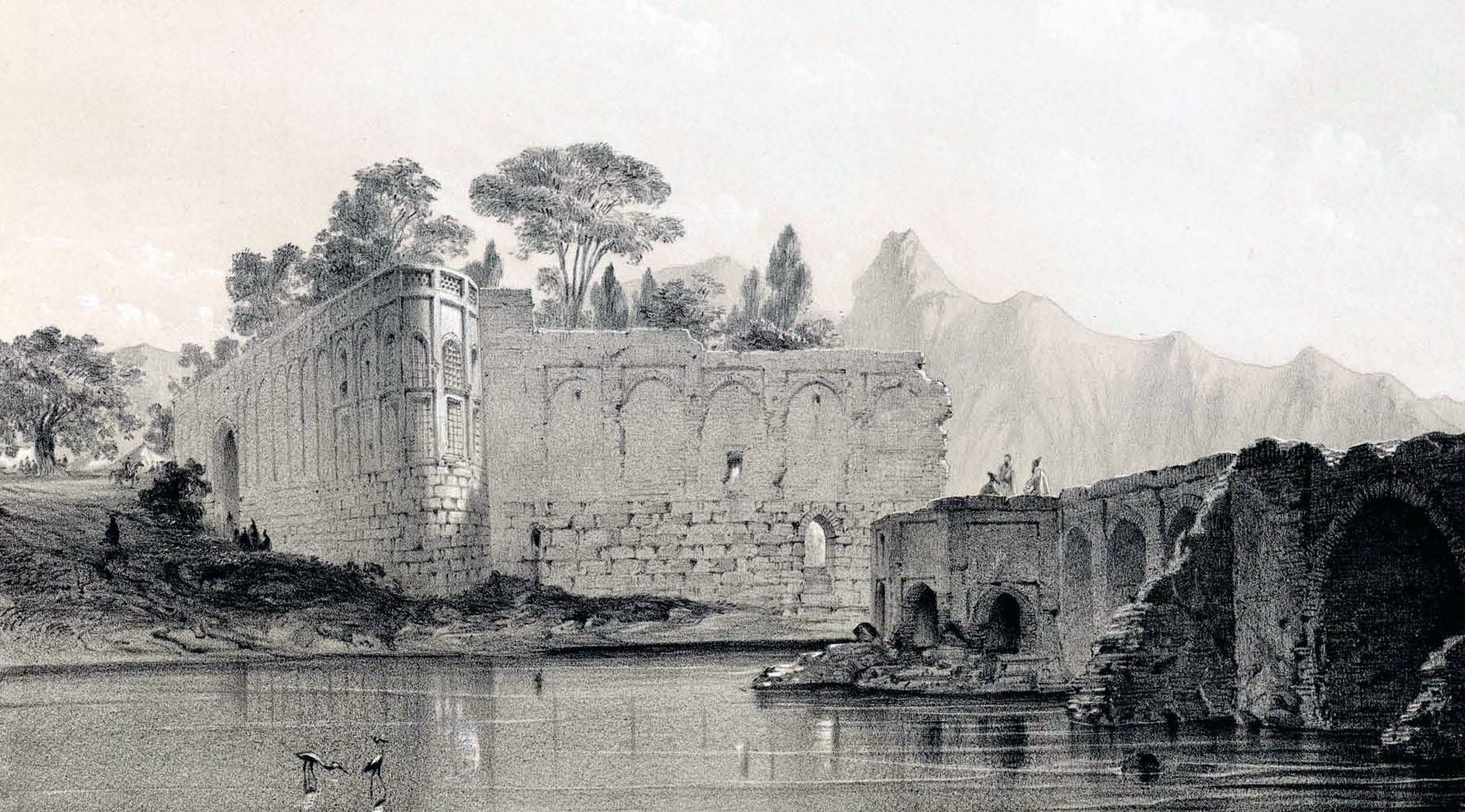
Joubi bridge and the now demolished Haft Dast Palace by Eugène Flandin, 1840

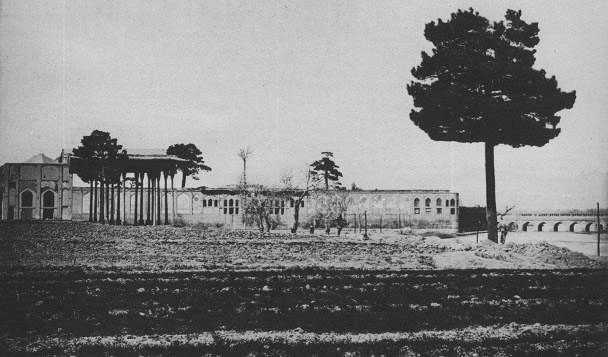
The now demolished Ayeneh khaneh Palace (left) and Haft Dast Palace (centre), with Joubi bridge (right), by Ernst Hoeltzer, 1890
