= Zayandeh River Culture =

Hypothetical culture of 6th millennium BCE Iran

Zayandeh River Culture (تمدن زاینده رود, literally "Zāyandé-Rūd Civilization") is a hypothetical pre-historic culture that is theorized to have flourished around the Zayandeh River in Iran in the 6th millennium BC.

Archaeologists speculate that a possible early civilization existed along the banks of the Zayandeh River, developing at the same time as other ancient civilizations appeared alongside rivers in the region, such as the Sumerian civilization in Iraq and the Indus Valley civilization in ancient India.

The Zayandeh River Culture is considered as a very important Neolithic Iranian settlement, along with Ganj Dareh.

== Link with Sialk and Marvdasht civilizations ==
During the 2006 excavations, the Iranian archaeologists uncovered some artifacts that they linked to those from Sialk and Marvdasht.

== Archaeological discoveries ==
Previous archeological excavations in the Zayandeh River basin unearthed a 50,000-year-old cave containing Human and Animal remains.

"Following archaeological studies, we are going to excavate two historical hills, one of which is alongside Zayaneh River midway, and the other in the Gav khooni swamp." said Mohsen Javeri, head of archaeological studies of the Cultural Heritage of Isfahan.

According to Javeri, both of the selected hills of the site belong to the pre-historic period, but their exact date is not yet known. During the 2004 excavations within the perimeters of Isfahan city, it was determined that the city dates back to earlier than the 6th millennium BC.
