= Rozveh =

City in Isfahan province, Iran

Rozveh Persian: رزوه
- City
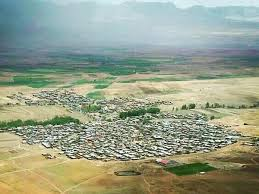
- Aerial view of the city of Rozveh

- Location within Iran
- Coordinates: 32°50′02″N 50°34′03″E
- Country: Iran
- Province: Isfahan
- County: Chadegan
- District: Central
- Established as a city: 1998

Population (2016)
  - Total: 4,332
- Time zone: UTC+3:30 (IRST)

Rozveh (Persian: رزوه) (Note: Also romanized as Rozweh; also known as Rozba and Rūzīyeh) is a city in the Central District of Chadegan County, Isfahan province, Iran, serving as the administrative center for Kabutarsorkh Rural District. The village of Rozveh was converted to a city in 1998.

== Demographics ==
=== Population ===
At the time of the 2006 National Census, the city's population was 4,916 in 1,153 households. The following census in 2011 counted 4,536 people in 1,318 households. The 2016 census measured the population of the city as 4,332 people in 1,351 households.
