= Felezi Bridge =

Bridge in Isfahan, Iran

Felezi Bridge Persian: پل فلزی
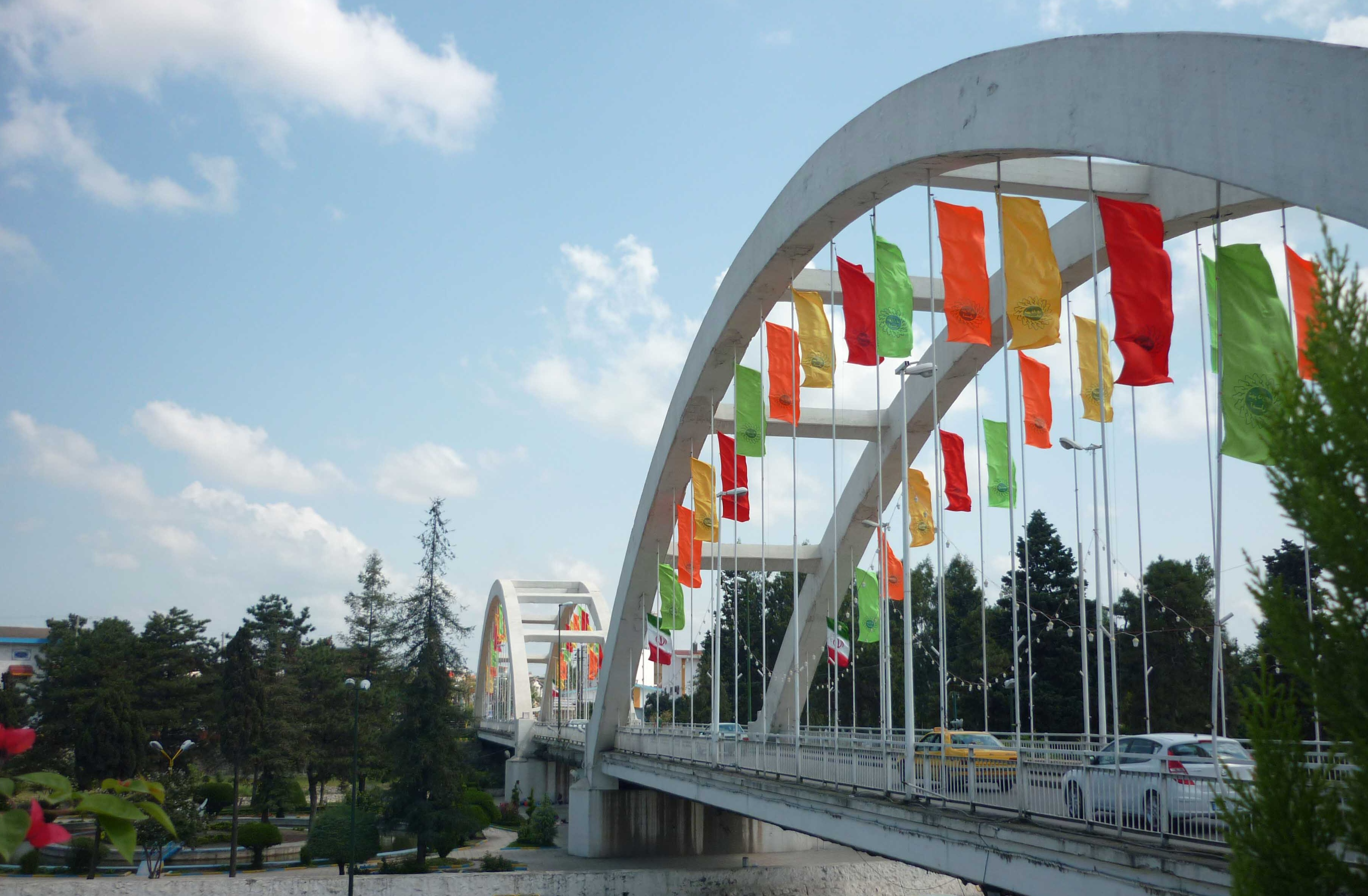
- Coordinates: 32°38′34″N 51°39′12″E
- Crosses: Zayanderud
- Locale: Isfahan, Iran

History
- Construction end: 1957

Location
- Interactive map of Felezi Bridge

Felezi Bridge (Persian: پل فلزی, lit. 'Metal Bridge') is a bridge in Isfahan, Iran. It was the first modern bridge built in the city, during the 1950s, over the Zayandeh River.
