= Gavkhouni =

Lake in Isfahan province, Iran

Coordinates: 32.13492°N 52.91153°E

Designations

Ramsar Wetland
- Official name: Gavkhouni Lake and marshes of the lower Zaindeh Rud
- Designated: 23 June 1975
- Reference no.: 53

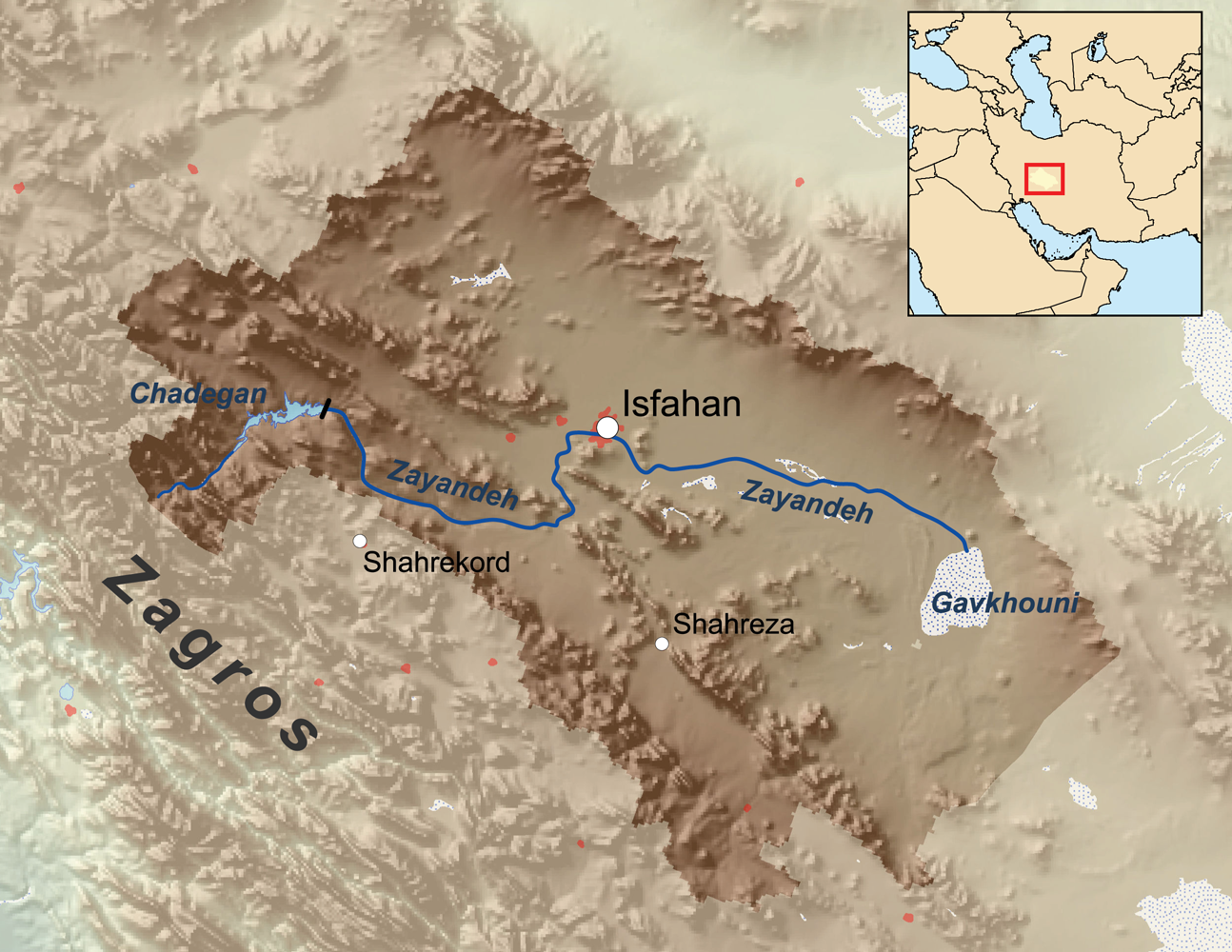
Map of the Zayandeh/Gavkhouni drainage basin

Gavkhouni (Persian: گاوخونی, romanized: Gāwxuni) also written as Batlaq-e-Gavkhuni, located in the Iranian Plateau in central Iran, east of the city of Isfahan, is the terminal basin of the Zayandeh River. Gavkhouni is a salt marsh with a salinity of 31.5% and an average depth of about 1 m. The salt marsh can dry up in summer. The Zayandeh River originates in the Zagros mountains, and travels around 300 km, before terminating in Gavkhouni.

Gavkhouni receives pollution from Isfahan and other urban sources. Isfahan is a major oasis city on the Zayandeh River with a population around 2 million.

The marshes were designated a Ramsar site in 1975, the 19th wetland in Iran designated as a Wetland of International Importance on the Ramsar list. The wetland is home to a variety of migratory birds including flamingos, ducks, geese, gulls, pelicans, and grebes. The vegetation of the area is very specialised; there are no green plants and trees around the lake due to soil salinity, but in the wetland, different species such as reeds, cattail, Schoenoplectus, pondweeds and various algae grow.

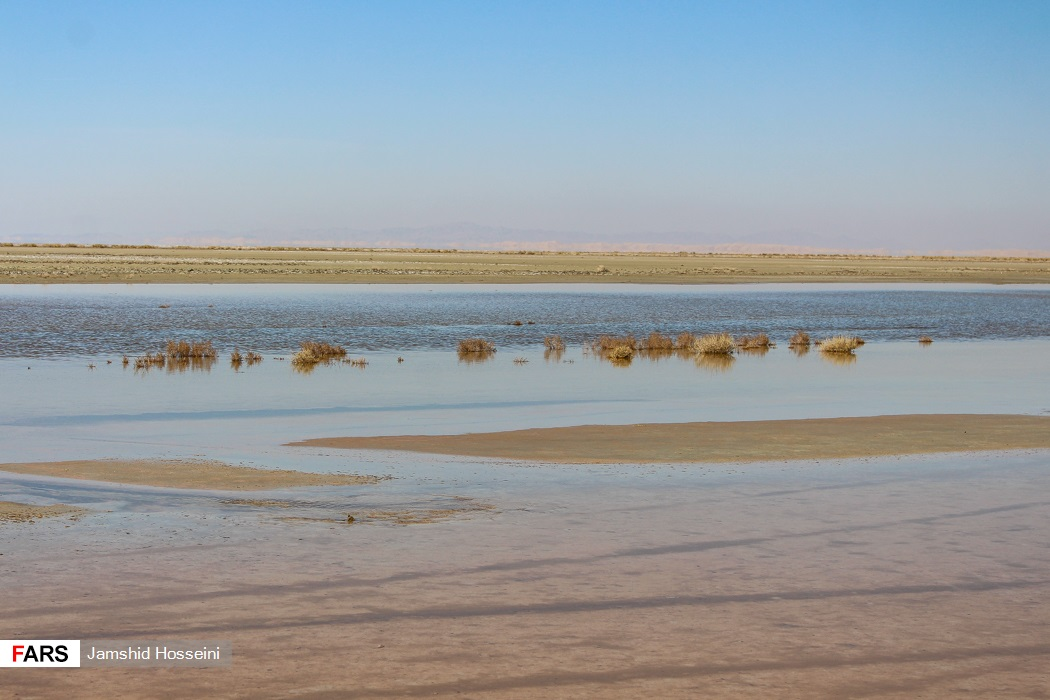
Gavkhouni in March 2019

== Territorial and ecological importance ==
Gavkhoni Wetland has many ecological values, including groundwater feeding, flood control, food storage, suitable habitat for wildlife, preventing the infiltration of surface water and underground water, maintaining the surface area against erosive factors such as wind and storm, preventing From the expansion of the desert, the stabilization of sand dunes, the acceptance of thousands of migratory birds, the purification of toxic substances and diseases, the natural processing of fodder production, tourist attractions, transportation and its economic and social transfer for the people of the region.

According to the conducted studies, 229 animal species from 5 categories of vertebrates including: 49 mammal species, 125 bird species, 42 reptile species, one amphibian species, and 12 fish species have been identified in the Zayandeh River watershed.

== Drying of the Gavkhouni ==
Unfortunately, Isfahan's Gavkhouni Lagoon is currently "100%" dry. Experts say that the drying up of the Gavkhouni lagoon will increase migration and destroy the job opportunities provided through tourism.

=== Causes of drying ===
This wetland has dried up due to excessive harvesting of the water resources of the Zayandeh river basin, as well as due to mismanagement and non-expert works in recent years and has lost many functions and ecosystem services that it had for local communities. In recent years, as a result of indiscriminate construction of dams for economic purposes and the drying of Zayandeh River, the largest river in the central regions of Iran which fed the wetland, this wetland has also dried up. In this way, it should be said that the drying up of this international wetland is not primarily the result of the deterioration of global climate conditions. Rather, it is the product of improper management of the environment in Iran, and the lack of a comprehensive vision of development and disregard for the quality of human life and habitat has led to such a disaster. Meanwhile, Iran is a member of the international Ramsar Convention, and according to it, it has no right to pass laws that will dry up the wetlands.

=== Consequences of wetland drying ===
- Government officials say: the drying up of the Gavkhouni wetland means the creation of a large center of dust in the country and the destruction of five provinces, including Isfahan, Chaharmahal and Bakhtiari, Qom, Semnan, Yazd, and according to experts, it may even reach Tehran.
- It cannot be said that the drying up of the lagoon has only affected agriculture. It should be said that the dryness of the river has had an effect on the drying of the wetland and the decrease of water in the region and the lowering of the underground water level, which has greatly affected the agriculture of the region.
- The drying up of the wetland has endangered the livelihood of the people of the region and has also caused an increase in unemployment and the migration of local residents.
- This event has also changed the vegetation and animal habitats and diseases such as cancer have grown.
