= Zayanderud Dam =

Arch dam near Chadegan, Iran

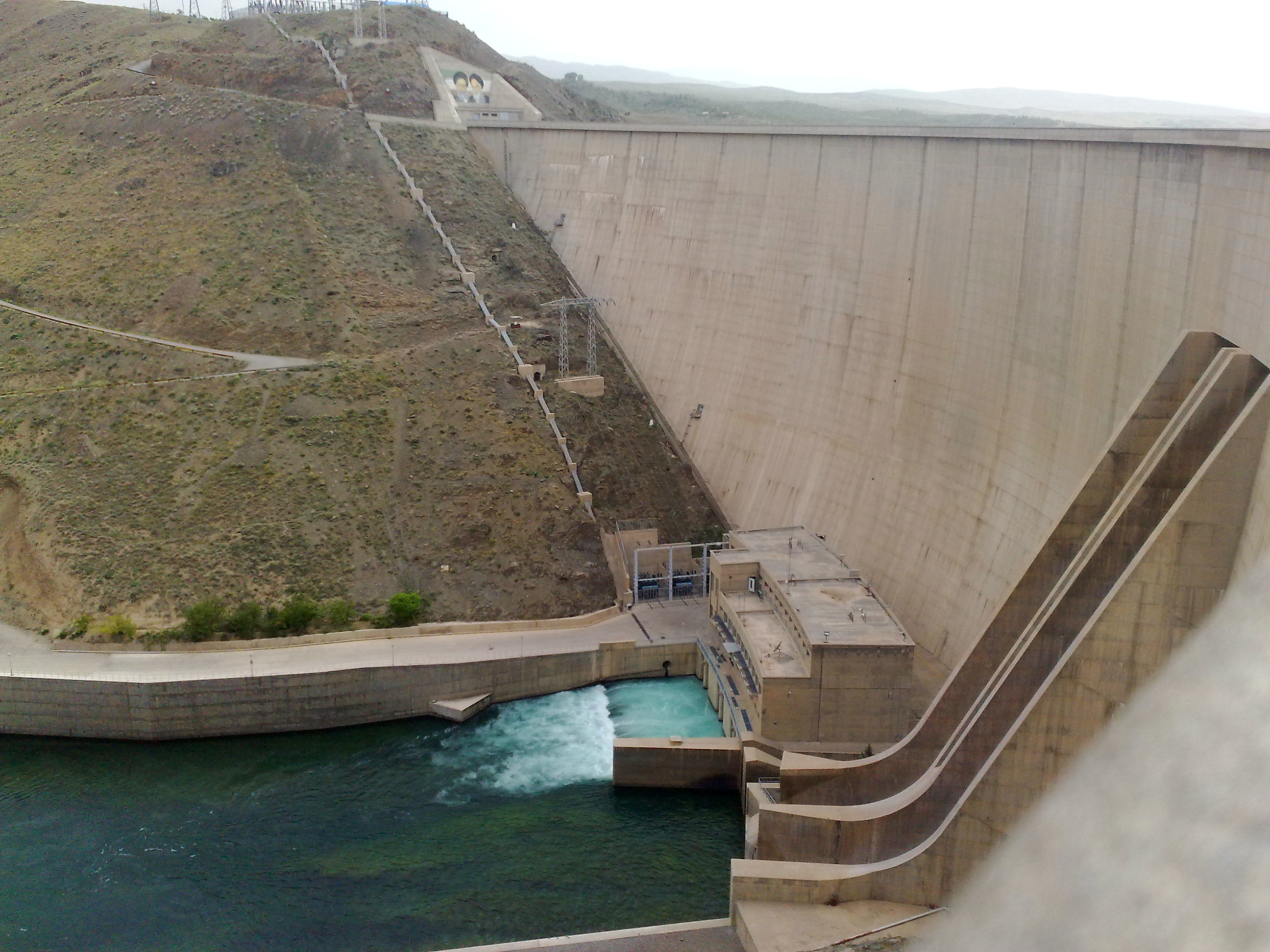

- Location within Iran
- Interactive map of Zayanderud Dam
- Country: Iran
- Location: Chadegan, Iran
- Coordinates: 32°44′02″N 50°44′13″E
- Purpose: Water supply, Power, Irrigation
- Status: Operational
- Construction began: 1967
- Opening date: 1971
- Owner: Water Regional Company of Esfahan

Dam and spillways
- Type of dam: Arch dam
- Impounds: Zayandeh River
- Height: 88 m (289 ft)
- Height (foundation): 100 m (330 ft)
- Length: 450 m (1,480 ft)
- Width (crest): 6.50 m (21.3 ft)
- Width (base): 28.72 m (94.2 ft)

Reservoir
- Total capacity: 1,450,000,000 m^{3} (1,180,000 acre⋅ft)

Power Station
- Installed capacity: 55 MW
- Website https://www.esrw.ir/st/130

Zayanderud Dam, also spelled Zayandeh Rud Dam (Persian: سد زاینده‌رود) and formerly known as the Shah Abbas the Great Dam, is an arch dam on the Zayandeh River about 10 km (6.2 mi) east of Chadegan, Iran. The Zayanderud Dam is the main water reservoir with 1450 MCM capacity and has been exploited since 1971.

The Zayanderud has provided the needs of water for important economic activities including agricultural, industrial and domestic consumptions. The primary purpose of the dam is water supply to Isfahan which lies 88 km (55 mi) to the east. It also supports a power station with an installed capacity of 55 MW. In recent years, the Zayandeh River has experienced significant reductions in flow due to a combination of drought, climate change, and overuse of water resources.

== See also ==
- List of power stations in Iran
- List of dams and reservoirs in Iran
