= Shahrestan Bridge =

Bridge in Isfahan, Iran

Shahrestan Bridge Persian: پل شهرستان
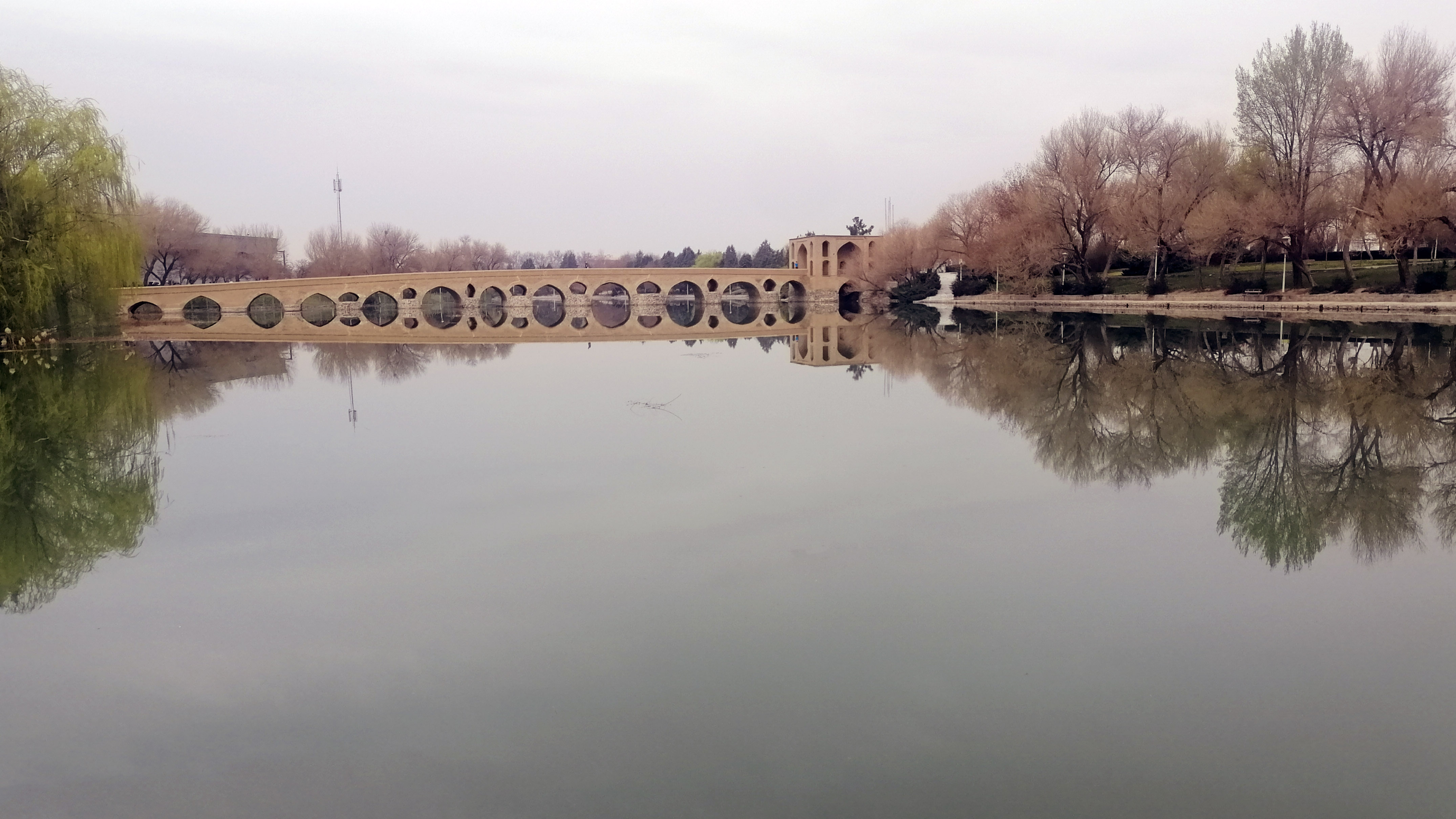
- Coordinates: 32°37′37″N 51°43′04″E
- Crosses: Zayanderud
- Locale: Isfahan, Iran

History
- Construction end: 1957

Location
- Interactive map of Shahrestan Bridge

The Shahrestan bridge is the oldest bridge on the Zayandeh River in Iran. The foundations date back to the Sasanian era (224–651 C.E.), but the top was renovated twice, first in the 10th century by the Buyids, then in the 11th century during the Seljuk era.

The bridge consists of two parabolas. The vertical parabola ensures that the middle of the bridge is its highest point. The horizontal parabola produces a bend to the west, strengthening it against the flow of the river. The bridge is 107.8 metres long and an average of 5.2 metres wide. It has two tiers of pointed arches, thirteen large ones spanning the river itself, and eight smaller ones that nest between them. The Zayandeh River has recently been diverted about 100 meters away from the bridge towards the south, leaving an artificial lake around the bridge to protect it from further damage.

== Gallery ==
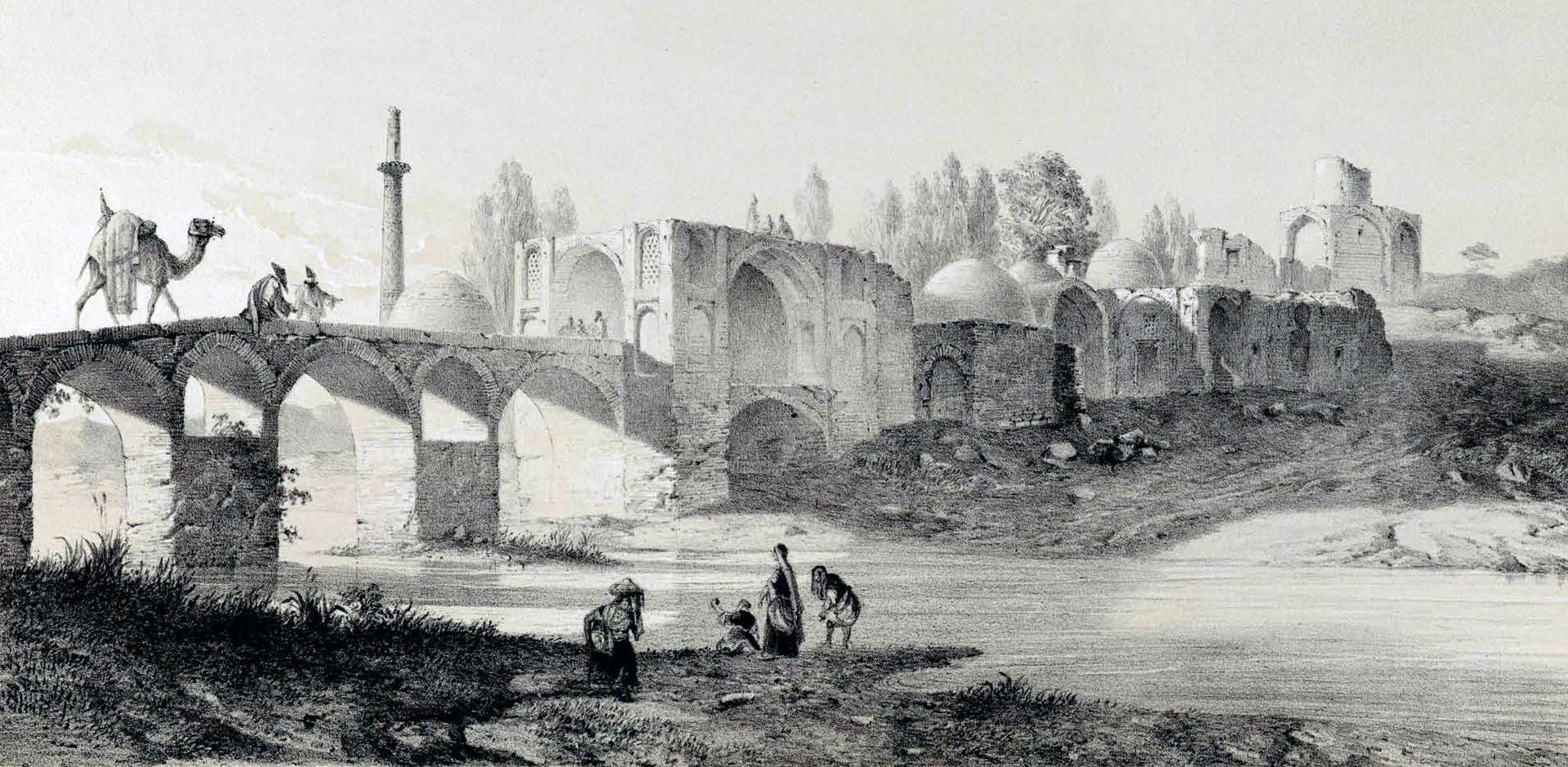
Drawing of the bridge by Eugène Flandin, 1840

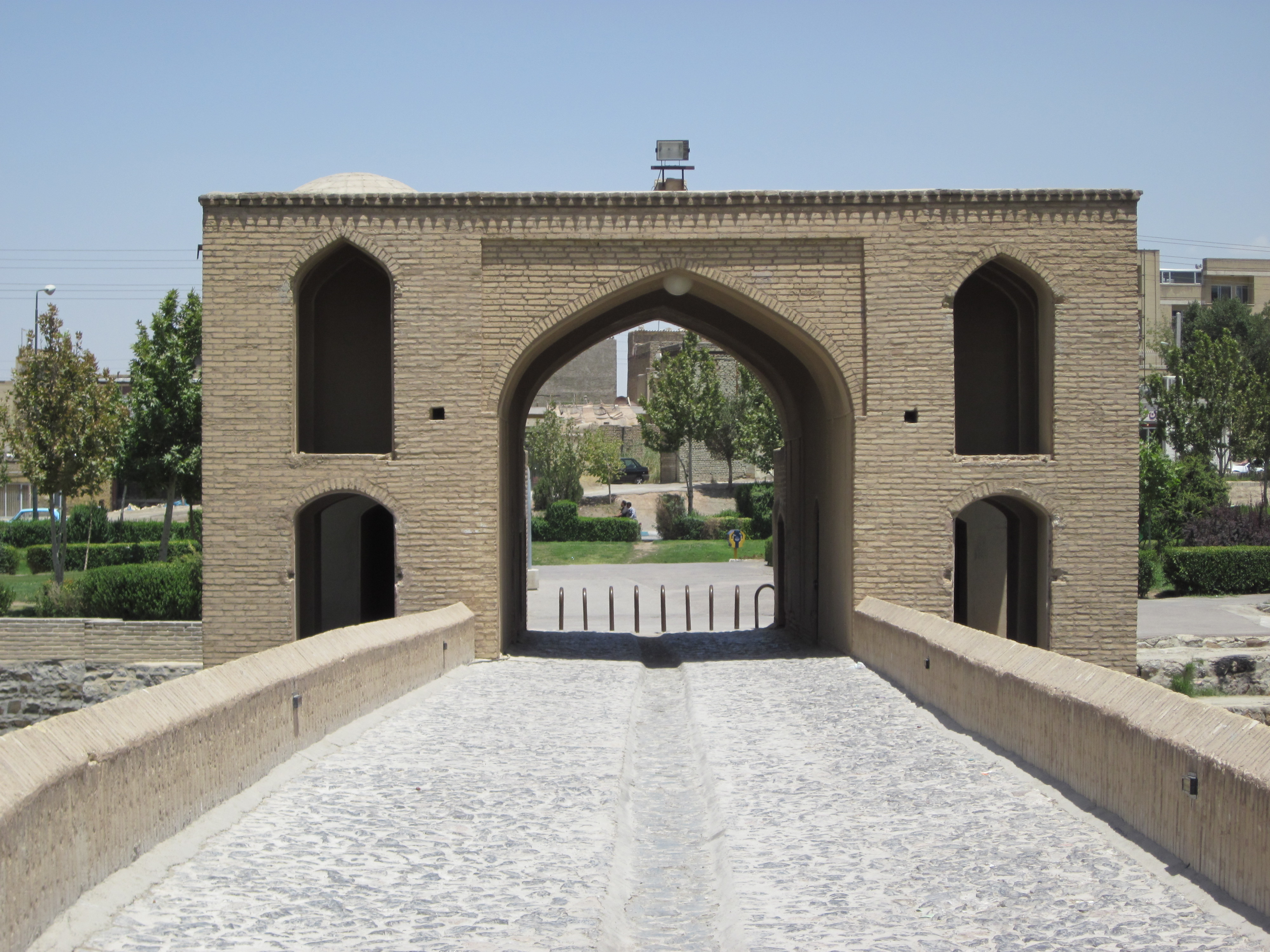

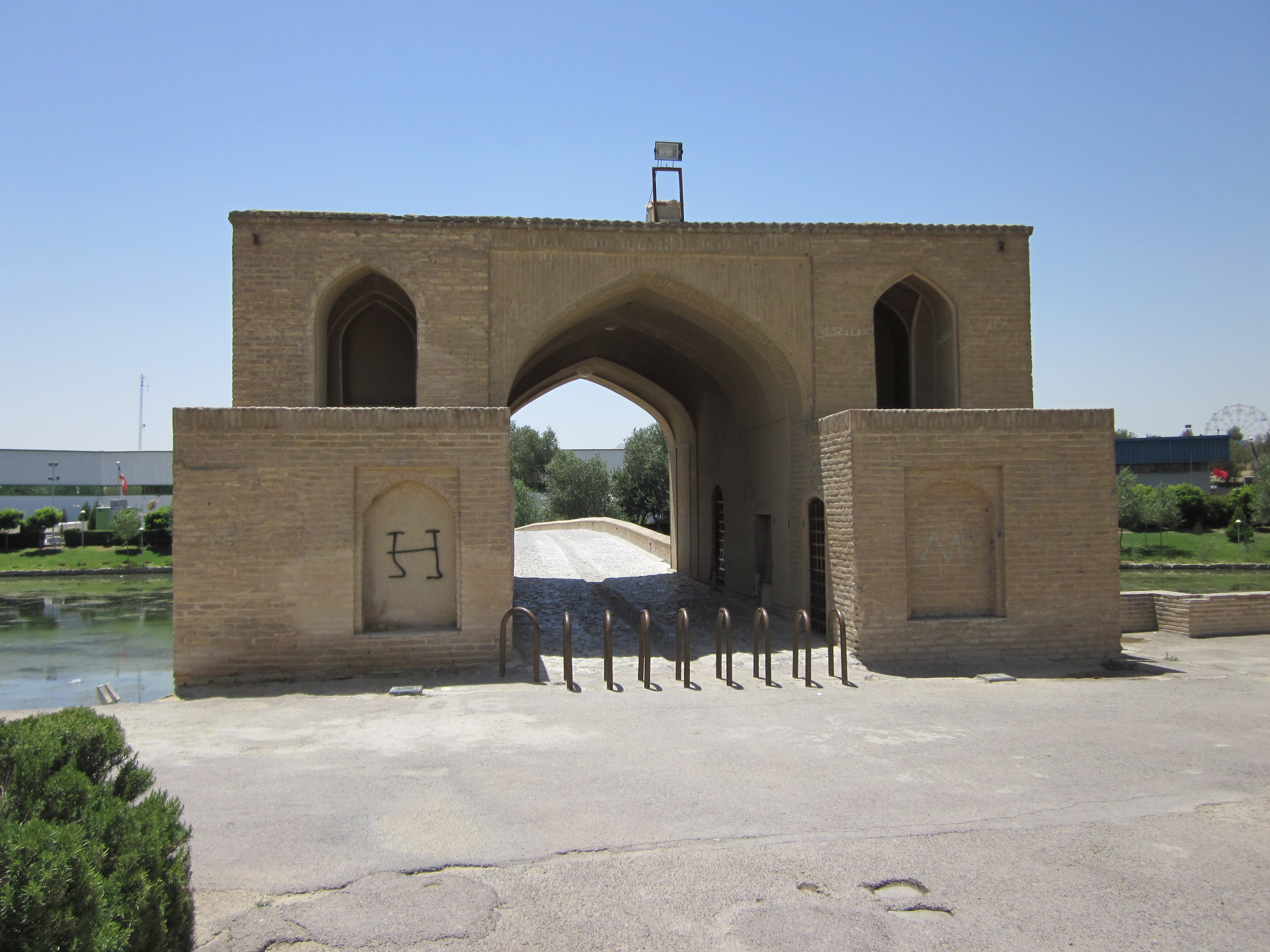

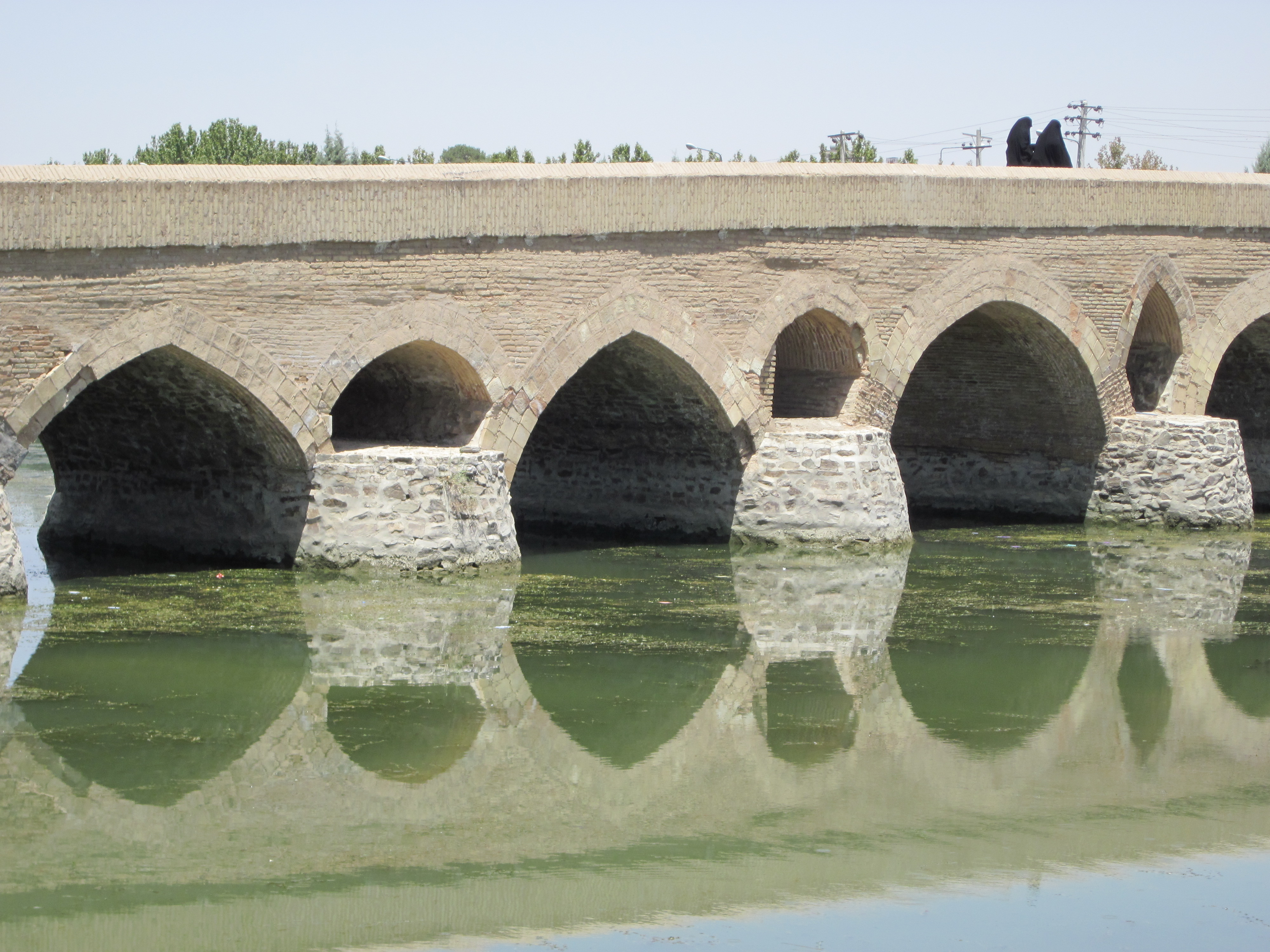

== See also ==
- Bridges over the Zayandeh River
