= Ben-Borujen water supply =

Iranian government project

Ben-Borujen water supply is an Iranian government project to supply 100 million cube meter of Zayanderud Dam water to the Borujen steel factory in Sefid Dasht with 128 km (80 mi) tunnel. Its budget was more than 990 billion toman.

== Background ==
It was opened November 20, 2023. Iranian Ministry of Energy administration has approved this, yet it is criticized by people. Asriran called it the death blow to the dry river. The water transfer has effectively ended the water sharing by the 400 year old Sheikh Bahai scrolls. It was stopped by the previous government in 2020 for a full year. Several people were arrested for bribery in the approving project. Esfahan today called it crossing recline.

The government has said they will replace the transferred water with future water project Kohrang 3 tunnel and also a proposed new dam by 2025, it received criticism also for being yet another false promise. Esfahan Today called out the governor saying the government does not allow women musicians in concert but does allow this. The project is in conflict with طرح انتقال آب بهشت‌آباد that brings water in the opposite of it.
