= Chadegan =

City in Isfahan province, Iran

Chadegan Persian: چادگان
- City
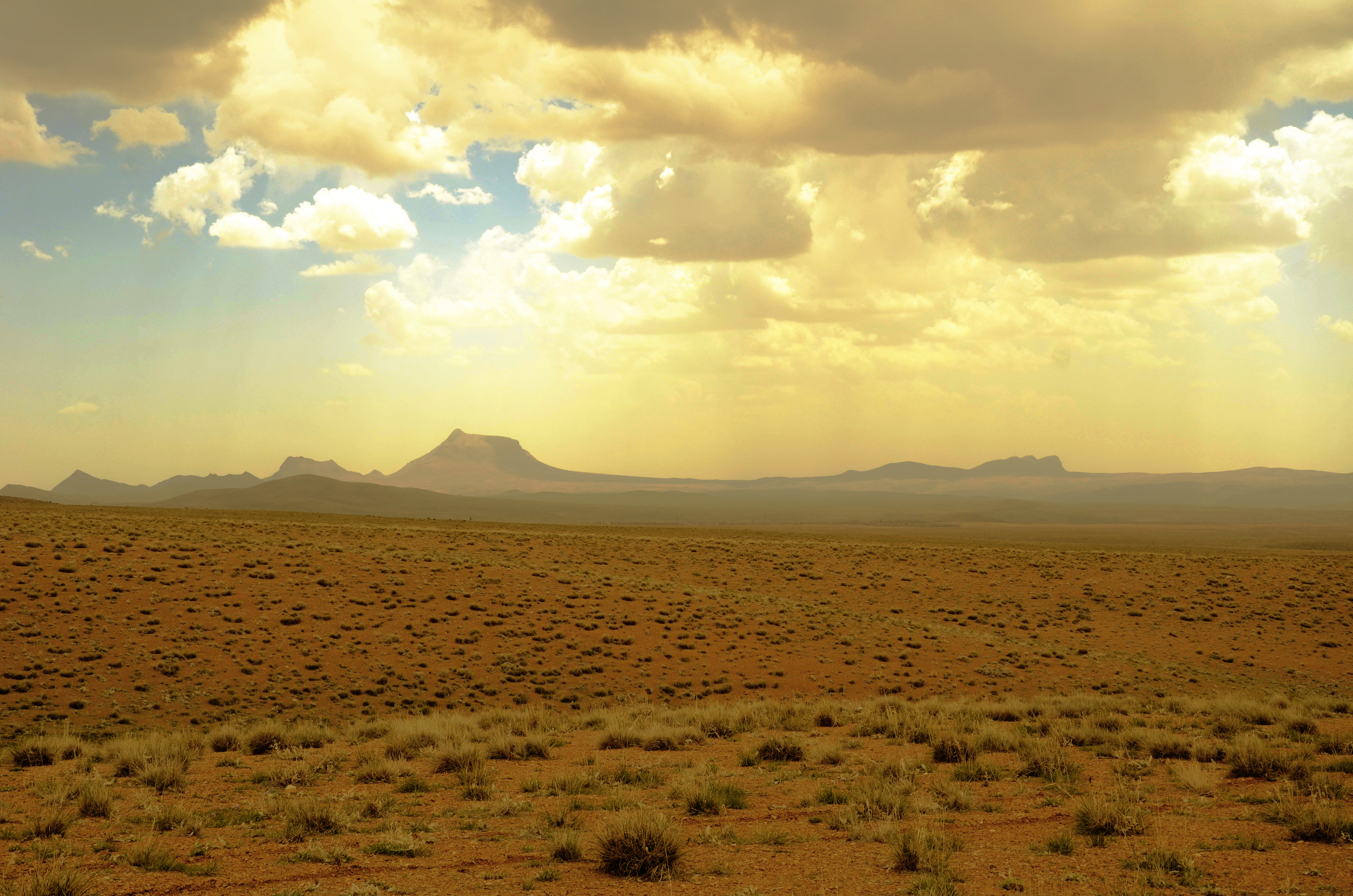
- Iran–Isfahan–Chadegan road

- Location within Iran
- Coordinates: 32°46′15″N 50°37′30″E
- Country: Iran
- Province: Isfahan
- County: Chadegan
- District: Central

Population (2016)
  - Total: 9,924
- Time zone: UTC+3:30 (IRST)

Chadegan (Persian: چادگان) (Note: Also romanized as Chādegān and Chādgān; also known as Chadgūn and Chadūgān) is a city in the Central District of Chadegan County, Isfahan province, Iran, serving as capital of both the county and the district.

== Demographics ==
=== Population ===
At the time of the 2006 National Census, the city's population was 7,037 in 1,872 households. The following census in 2011 counted 9,738 people in 2,655 households. The 2016 census measured the population of the city as 9,924 people in 2,927 households.

== Dam and reservoir ==
Chadegan Reservoir on the Zayandeh Rood river is the largest in Isfahan province. It was formed in 1972 by the Zayandeh Dam. The dam was initially named Shah Abbas Dam after Shah Abbas I, the most influential king of the Safavid dynasty, but it was changed to Zayandeh Dam after the Islamic revolution in 1979. Since 1972, the Chadegan Reservoir has helped prevent seasonal flooding of the Zayandeh River.
