= Central District (Chadegan County) =

District in Isfahan province, Iran

Central District (Chadegan County) Persian: بخش مرکزی شهرستان چادگان
- District
- Location within Iran
- Coordinates: 32°49′N 50°36′E
- Country: Iran
- Province: Isfahan
- County: Chadegan
- Established: 2002
- Capital: Chadegan

Population (2016)
  - Total: 27,000
- Time zone: UTC+3:30 (IRST)

The Central District of Chadegan County (Persian: بخش مرکزی شهرستان چادگان) is in Isfahan province, Iran. Its capital is the city of Chadegan.

== Demographics ==
=== Population ===
At the time of the 2006 National Census, the district's population was 26,759 in 6,658 households. The following census in 2011 counted 27,548 people in 7,813 households. The 2016 census measured the population of the district as 27,000 inhabitants in 8,285 households.

=== Administrative divisions ===
Central District (Chadegan County) Population
| Administrative Divisions | 2006 | 2011 | 2016 |
|---|---|---|---|
| Kabutarsorkh RD | 8,922 | 7,989 | 7,488 |
| Kaveh Ahangar RD | 5,884 | 5,285 | 5,256 |
| Chadegan (city) | 7,037 | 9,738 | 9,924 |
| Rozveh (city) | 4,916 | 4,536 | 4,332 |
| Total | 26,759 | 27,548 | 27,000 |
RD = Rural District
