= Chadegan County =

County in Isfahan province, Iran

Chadegan County Persian: شهرستان چادگان
- County
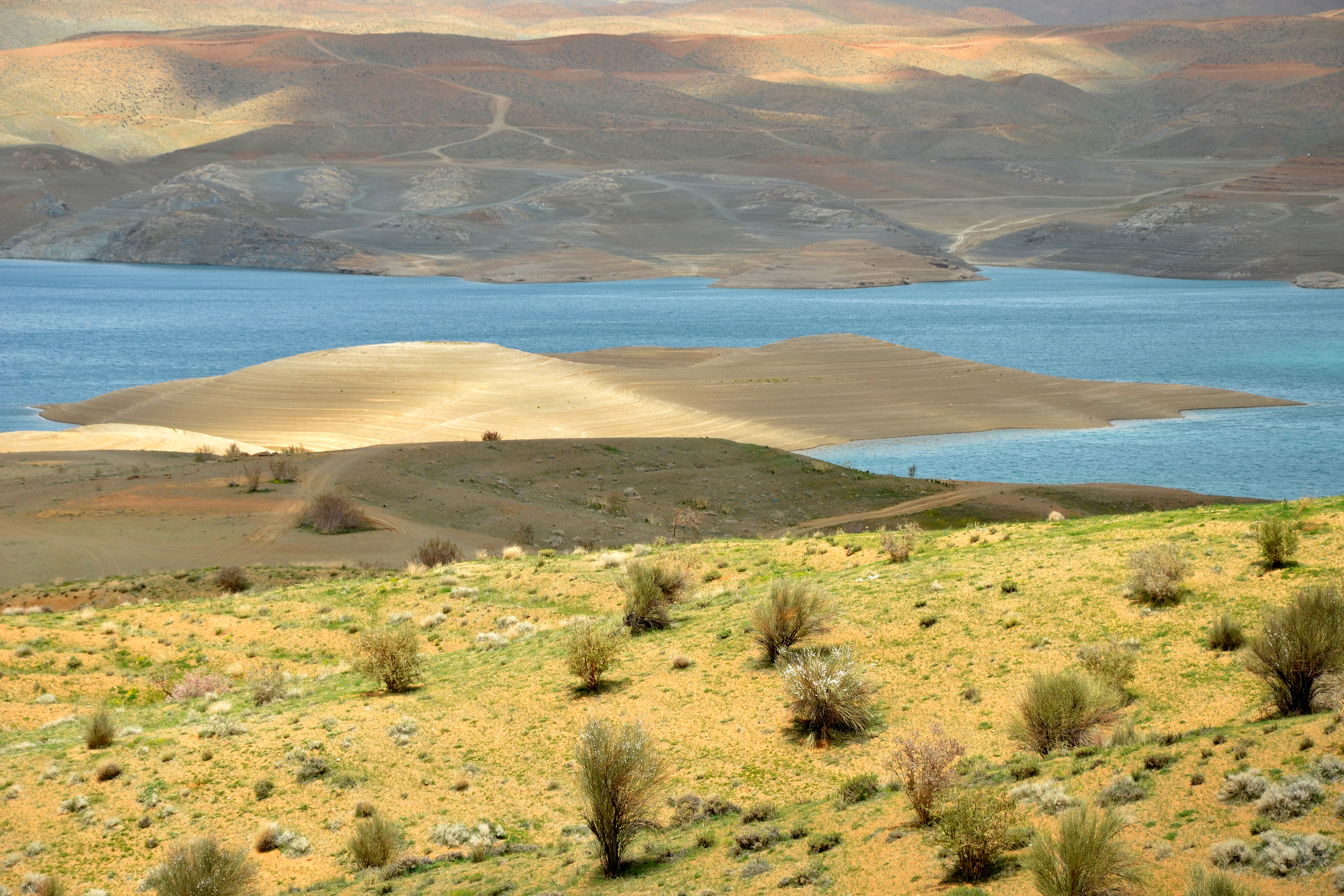
- Zayandeh Rud landscape in Chadegan County

- Location of Chadegan County in Isfahan province (left, green)

- Location of Isfahan province in Iran
- Coordinates: 32°45′N 50°31′E
- Country: Iran
- Province: Isfahan
- Established: 2002
- Capital: Chadegan
- Districts: Central, Chenarud

Population (2016)
  - Total: 32,479
- Time zone: UTC+3:30 (IRST)

Chadegan County (Persian: شهرستان چادگان) is in Isfahan province, Iran. Its capital is the city of Chadegan.

== Demographics ==
=== Population ===
At the time of the 2006 National Census, the county's population was 33,684 in 8,169 households. The following census in 2011 counted 33,942 people in 9,465 households. At the time of the 2006 National Census, the county's population was 32,479 in 9,833 households.

=== Administrative divisions ===
Chadegan County's population history and administrative structure over three consecutive censuses are shown in the following table.

Chadegan County Population
Administrative Divisions	2006	2011	2016
Central District	26,759	27,548	27,000
Kabutarsorkh RD	8,922	7,989	7,488
Kaveh Ahangar RD	5,884	5,285	5,256
Chadegan (city)	7,037	9,738	9,924
Rozveh (city)	4,916	4,536	4,332
Chenarud District	6,925	6,394	5,479
Chenarud-e Jonubi RD	2,651	2,421	1,945
Chenarud-e Shomali RD	4,274	3,973	3,534
Total	33,684	33,942	32,479
RD = Rural District

== See also ==
Media related to Chadegan County at Wikimedia Commons
