= Ab Bid =

Ab Bid (Persian: اب بيد) may refer to:

== Fars Province ==
- Ab Bid, Fars, Mamasani County
- Ab Bid, Doshman Ziari, Mamasani County
- Ab Bid-e Dalun, Mamasani County
- Ab Bid, Sepidan, Sepidan County

== Hormozgan Province ==
- Ab Bid-e Kusha, Hormozgan Province

== Khuzestan Province ==
- Ab Bid, Andika, Khuzestan Province
- Ab Bid-e Galleh Tavak, Andika County, Khuzestan Province
- Ab Bid, Mazu, Andimeshk County, Khuzestan Province
- Ab Bid, Qilab, Andimeshk County, Khuzestan Province
- Ab Bid, Behbahan, Khuzestan Province
- Ab Bid, Dezful, Khuzestan Province
- Ab Bid, alternate name of Abid, Dezful, Khuzestan Province
- Ab Bid Sari-ye Do, Dezful County, Khuzestan Province
- Ab Bid-e Alibaz, Gotvand County, Khuzestan Province
- Ab Bid-e Hajj Baba, Gotvand County, Khuzestan Province
- Ab Bid, Izeh, Izeh County, Khuzestan Province
- Ab Bid, Hati, Lali County, Khuzestan Province
- Ab Bid, Jastun Shah, Lali County, Khuzestan Province
- Ab Bid, Masjed Soleyman, Khuzestan Province

== Kohgiluyeh and Boyer-Ahmad Province ==
- Ab Bid, Kohgiluyeh and Boyer-Ahmad
- Ab Bid, Boyer-Ahmad, Kohgiluyeh and Boyer-Ahmad Province
- Ab Bid-e Heygun, Kohgiluyeh and Boyer-Ahmad Province
- Ab Bid-e Mazeh Koreh, Kohgiluyeh and Boyer-Ahmad Province

== Lorestan Province ==
- Ab Bid, Lorestan
- Ab Bid Kardakaneh, Lorestan Province
