= List of bridges in Iran =

== Historical and architectural interest bridges ==
	Name	Persian	Type	Length	Type	Carries Crosses	Opened	Location	Province	Ref.
1	Band-e Kaisar; Caesar's dam	بند قیصر	Shushtar Historical Hydraulic System; World Heritage Site; Iran National Heritage	500 m (1,600 ft)	Masonry; Dam bridge	Out of order Karun	3rd century	Shushtar; 32°03′15.2″N 48°50′54.5″E	Khuzestan	
2	Old Bridge of Dezful	پل قدیم دزفول	Iran National Heritage	370 m (1,210 ft)	Masonry; 14 arches	Dez River	3rd century	Dezful; 32°22′52.8″N 48°23′27.8″E	Khuzestan	
3	Pol-e Dokhtar Bridge	پلدختر	Build during the Sasanian era Height : 30 m (98 ft)	270 m (890 ft)	Masonry; 8 arches originally	Out of order Qizil-Uzun	3rd century	Pol-e Dokhtar; 33°09′36.8″N 47°42′56.3″E	Khuzestan	
4	Kavar Bridge	پل کوار	Build during the Sasanian era Iran National Heritage	125 m (410 ft)	Masonry; 6 arches originally	Out of order Qare Aghaj	3rd century	Kavar; 29°10′56.0″N 52°41′48.8″E	Fars	
5	Kashkan Bridge	پل کشکان	Iran National Heritage	320 m (1,050 ft)	Masonry; 12 arches originally	Out of order Karkheh River		Moradabad; 33°35′17.0″N 47°52′56.8″E	Lorestan	
6	Shapuri Bridge	پل شاپوری	Build during the Sasanian era Iran National Heritage	312 m (1,024 ft)	Masonry; 28 arches originally	Out of order		Khorramabad; 33°28′03.9″N 48°20′19.7″E	Lorestan	
7	Gavmishan Bridge	پل گاوميشان	Build during the Sasanian era Iran National Heritage	175 m (574 ft)	Masonry	Out of order Karkheh River		Halush; 33°05′02.5″N 47°32′16.2″E	Lorestan; Ilam	
8	Kiz Bridge	پل دختر میانه	Iran National Heritage; Span : 23.9 m (78 ft)		Masonry; 3 arches	Out of order Qizil Üzan	8th century	Mianeh; 37°19′27.1″N 47°49′06.3″E	East Azerbaijan	(Note: Also called Pol-e Dokhtar Bridge.)
9	Shahrestan Bridge	پل شهرستان	Build during the Seljuq dynasty Iran National Heritage	140 m (460 ft)	Masonry; 13 arches	Footbridge; Zayanderud	11th century	Isfahan; 32°37′37.3″N 51°43′03.5″E	Isfahan	
10	First Khodaafarin Bridge	پل خداآفرین	Azerbaijan–Iran border Iran National Heritage	160 m (520 ft)	Masonry; 11 arches	Out of order Aras	12th century	Khoda Afarin County–Cəbrayil; 39°09′25.1″N 46°56′13.6″E	East Azerbaijan; Azerbaijan	
11	Second Khodaafarin Bridge	پل خداآفرین	Azerbaijan–Iran border Iran National Heritage	120 m (390 ft)	Masonry; 15 arches	Footbridge; Aras	13th century	Khoda Afarin County–Cəbrayil; 39°09′03.1″N 46°56′25.4″E	East Azerbaijan; Azerbaijan	
12	Marnan Bridge	پل مارنان	Built during the Safavid dynasty		Masonry; 17 arches	Footbridge; Zayanderud	1599	Isfahan; 32°38′28.9″N 51°38′36.2″E	Isfahan	
13	Si-o-se-pol	سی وسه پل	Built during the Safavid dynasty Iran National Heritage	298 m (978 ft)	Masonry; 33 arches (2 levels); Dam bridge	Footbridge; Zayanderud	1602	Isfahan; 32°38′40.5″N 51°40′02.9″E	Isfahan	(Note: Also called Allah Verdy Khan Bridge.)
14	Latidan Bridge	پل لاتیدان	Iran National Heritage		Masonry	Out of order Kul River	1619	Nimeh Kar; 27°11′39.2″N 55°45′00.4″E	Hormozgan	
15	Khaju Bridge	پل خواجو	Built during the Safavid dynasty Iran National Heritage	132 m (433 ft)	Masonry; 21 arches (2 levels); Dam bridge	Footbridge; Zayanderud	1650	Isfahan; 32°38′12.6″N 51°40′59.9″E	Isfahan	
16	Joubi Bridge	پل جویی	Built during the Safavid dynasty Iran National Heritage	147 m (482 ft)	Masonry; 21 arches	Footbridge; Zayanderud	1665	Isfahan; 32°38′16.8″N 51°40′38.8″E	Isfahan	
17	Mohammad Hassan Khan bridge	پل محمدحسن‌خان	Iran National Heritage	140 m (460 ft)	Masonry; 9 arches	Babol Roud	18th century	Babol; 36°31′27.1″N 52°39′50.5″E	Mazandaran province	
18	Davazdah Cheshmeh	پل دوازده چشمه	Built during the Safavid dynasty Iran National Heritage	130 m (430 ft)	Masonry; 12 arches	Haraz River	18th century	Amol; 36°28′17.5″N 52°21′21.9″E	Mazandaran province	
19	Adobe Bridge of Langarud	پل خشتی لنگرود	Iran National Heritage	37 m (121 ft)	Masonry; 2 arches	Langeroud river	18th century	Langarud; 37°11′46.5″N 50°09′04.4″E	Gilan	
20	Maragha Bridge	پل مردق	Built during the Safavid dynasty Iran National Heritage	26 m (85 ft)	Masonry; 3 arches	Mardaq-Chay		Maragheh; 37°20′35.3″N 46°24′13.0″E	East Azerbaijan	
21	Shapoor Bridge	پل شاپور	Built during the Qajar dynasty Iran National Heritage		Masonry; 2 arches	Otjun River		Chaybagh; 36°21′02.0″N 52°51′35.7″E	Mazandaran province	
22	Miandoab Bridge	پل میرزا رسول	Built during the Qajar dynasty Iran National Heritage	52 m (171 ft)	Masonry; 5 arches	Out of order Zarrineh River		Miandoab; 36°57′24.2″N 46°03′12.3″E	West Azerbaijan	
23	Pol-e Siah	پل سیاه اهواز	Iran National Heritage	1,050 m (3,440 ft)	Beam; Steel	Railway bridge Karun	1929	Ahvaz; 31°19′57.8″N 48°40′50.0″E	Khuzestan	(Note: Also called Black Bridge or Victory Bridge.)
24	Veresk Bridge	پل ورسک	Iran National Heritage; Span : 66 m (217 ft); Height : 110 m (360 ft)	112 m (367 ft)	Masonry; 1 main arch, 10 secondary arches	Trans-Iranian Railway	1936	Veresk; 35°54′11.9″N 52°59′26.7″E	Mazandaran province	
25	Moalagh Bridge	پل معلق آمل	Iran National Heritage	140 m (460 ft)	Arch; Concrete tied-arch	Haraz River	1959	Amol; 36°28′13.8″N 52°21′21.6″E	Mazandaran province	
26	Tabiat Bridge	پل طبیعت		270 m (890 ft)	Truss; Steel	Footbridge; Modarres Expressway	2014	Tehran; 35°45′15.5″N 51°21′13.6″E	Tehran	
27	Meshginshahr suspension bridge	پل معلق مشگین‌شهر	Span : 325 m (1,066 ft); Height : 80 m (260 ft)		Suspension; Steel	Footbridge; Khiav River	2015	Meshginshahr; 38°22′30.8″N 47°41′02.2″E	Ardabil	

== Major bridges ==
	Name	Persian	Span	Length	Type	Carries Crosses	Opened	Location	Province	Ref.
1	Persian Gulf Bridge under construction	پل خلیج فارس	360 m (1,180 ft)(x3)	3,430 m (11,250 ft)	Cable-stayed; Steel box girder deck, concrete pylons (180+360+180)x3	Road-rail bridge Clarence Strait		Bandar e Pol–Qeshm Island; 26°57′44.9″N 55°45′16.8″E	Hormozgan	
2	Karun 4 Arch Bridge	پل قوسی کارون 4	300 m (980 ft)	378 m (1,240 ft)	Arch; Steel deck arch	Road 72 (Iran); Karun (reservoir of Karun-4 Dam)	2015	Kabusi; 31°38′28.9″N 50°29′22.7″E	Chaharmahal and Bakhtiari	
3	Sebalootak Bridge	پل ترکه ای سه بلوطک	260 m (850 ft)	416 m (1,365 ft)	Cable-stayed; Composite steel/concrete deck, concrete pylons 105+260+51	Road bridge Karun (reservoir of Karun-3 Dam)	2020	Zaras; 31°35′26.6″N 50°16′31.1″E	Khuzestan	
4	Lali Bridge	پل لالی	256 m (840 ft)	460 m (1,510 ft)	Cable-stayed; Composite steel/concrete deck, concrete pylons 102+256+102	Lali New Road; Karun (reservoir of Upper Gotvand Dam)	2011	Lali; 32°15′49.3″N 49°04′40.9″E	Khuzestan	
5	Karun 3 Dam Bridge	سد کارون 3	252 m (827 ft)	336 m (1,102 ft)	Arch; Steel deck arch	Road 72 (Iran); Karun (reservoir of Karun-3 Dam)	2005	Bajool; 31°46′55.0″N 50°07′07.1″E	Khuzestan	
6	Ghotour Bridge	پل قطور	223 m (732 ft)	443 m (1,453 ft)	Arch; Steel truss deck arch	Trans-Iranian Railway; Qatur River	1970	Khoy; 38°28′40.8″N 44°46′06.4″E	West Azerbaijan	
7	Eighth Ahvaz Bridge	پل هشتم	212 m (696 ft)	643 m (2,110 ft)	Cable-stayed; Composite steel/concrete deck, concrete pylons 78+212+78	Road bridge Karun	2011	Ahvaz; 31°18′50.4″N 48°40′18.4″E	Khuzestan	
8	Karun 4 Cable-stayed Bridge	پل ترکه ای کارون 4	210 m (690 ft)	380 m (1,250 ft)	Cable-stayed; Steel deck and pylons 46+80+210+43	Road bridge Pipeline bridge Karun (reservoir of Karun-4 Dam)	2016	Morvari; 31°44′49.0″N 50°23′34.6″E	Khuzestan	
9	Karun 3 Dam East Bridge	سد کارون 3	160 m (520 ft)	213 m (699 ft)	Arch; Steel deck arch	Road 72 (Iran); Karun (reservoir of Karun-3 Dam)	2005	Bajool; 31°46′45.7″N 50°07′19.4″E	Khuzestan	
10	Bahrami Bridge	پل کابلی	150 m (490 ft)	675 m (2,215 ft)	Cable-stayed; Composite steel/concrete deck, concrete pylons 72+150+72	Shushtar Bypass Road 39; Karun	2006	Shushtar; 32°02′02.1″N 48°49′19.7″E	Khuzestan	
11	Ninth Ahvaz Bridge	پل نهم اهواز	150 m (490 ft)		Box girder Prestressed concrete 80+150+80	Road bridge Karun	2020	Ahvaz; 31°21′49.0″N 48°41′14.5″E	Khuzestan	
12	Mared Bridge	پل مارد	144 m (472 ft)	384 m (1,260 ft)	Arch; Steel tied arch	Road bridge Karun	2005	Khorramshahr; 30°25′51.5″N 48°10′36.1″E	Khuzestan	
13	Seventh Ahvaz Bridge	پل هفتم	140 m (460 ft)(x2)	490 m (1,610 ft)	Box girder Prestressed concrete 75+140+140+75	Road bridge Karun	1998	Ahvaz; 31°20′05.4″N 48°41′16.0″E	Khuzestan	
14	White Bridge	پل اهواز	136 m (446 ft)	501 m (1,644 ft)	Arch; Steel through arch 136 and 130 m	Felestin Street - Taleghani; Karun	1936	Ahvaz; 31°19′25.2″N 48°40′36.3″E	Khuzestan	
15	Ghaziyan Bridge	پل غازیان	125 m (410 ft)	275 m (902 ft)	Box girder Prestressed concrete 50+125+75+25; Twin bridges	Road 49 (Iran); Sefīd-Rūd	2005	Bandar-e Anzali; 37°27′55.7″N 49°28′05.5″E	Gilan	
16	Gotvand Bridge	پل گتوند	125 m (410 ft)	260 m (850 ft)	Box girder Prestressed concrete 67+125+67	Road bridge Karun	2009	Gotvand; 32°15′38.7″N 48°50′00.7″E	Khuzestan	
17	Sardar Shahid Haj Qasim bridge	پل سردار شهید حاج قاسم	125 m (410 ft)	264 m (866 ft)	Box girder Prestressed concrete 73+125+66	Freeway 7		Baseri Hadi; 30°43′37.4″N 52°03′34.7″E	Fars	
18	Sevom Khordad Bridge	پل سوم خرداد	120 m (390 ft)	300 m (980 ft)	Box girder Prestressed concrete 30+30+60+120+6	Road bridge Karun	2005	Darkhoveyn; 30°44′14.6″N 48°24′26.6″E	Khuzestan	
19	Tale Zang Bridge	پل راه آهن تله زنگ	107 m (351 ft)	224 m (735 ft)	Box girder Prestressed concrete 67+107+50	Dorud-Andimeshk railway Dez River	2012	Tale Zang; 32°49′31.5″N 48°45′53.3″E	Khuzestan	
20	Imam Hossein Bridge	پل امام حسین	101 m (331 ft)		Cable-stayed; Composite steel/concrete deck, concrete pylons	Road bridge		Mashhad; 36°19′38.8″N 59°37′26.2″E	Razavi Khorasan	
21	Karun 1 Dam Bridge	پل کارون 1	100 m (330 ft)	190 m (620 ft)	Box girder Prestressed concrete 45+100+45	Road bridge Karun	2005	Eslamabad; 32°02′06.1″N 49°36′34.7″E	Khuzestan	
22	Second Shushtar Bridge	پل دوم شوشتر	100 m (330 ft)(x2)	682 m (2,238 ft)	Arch; Steel tied-arch 100+2x76+100	Road bridge Karun	2011	Shushtar; 32°02′57.7″N 48°50′09.8″E	Khuzestan	
23	Urmia Lake Bridge	پل میان‌گذر دریاچه ارومیه	100 m (330 ft)	1,414 m (4,639 ft)	Arch; Steel tied-arch	Road 16 (Iran); Lake Urmia		Urmia–Aq Gonbad; 37°47′35.8″N 45°22′27.7″E	West Azerbaijan	

=== Bridges out of service ===
Name	Persian	Length	Type	Carries Crosses	Opened	Damaged	Location	Province	Ref.
Karaj B1 bridge	پل B۱	173 m (568 ft)	Extradosed; Concrete box girder deck, concrete pylons 97+173+97	Karaj Northern Bypass; Karaj River	2023 (first section)	2 April 2026	Karaj; 35°49′44.4″N 51°02′10.5″E	Alborz

== See also ==
- Transport in Iran
- List of roads and highways in Iran
- Islamic Republic of Iran Railways
- Geography of Iran

== Notes and references ==
- Notes
- Iran Tourism and Touring Organization. "List of Iranian bridges". itto.org.
- Nicolas Janberg. "International Database for Civil and Structural Engineering". Structurae.com.
- Other references
