= Dehloran, Khuzestan =

Dehloran دهلران
- Village
- Location within Iran
- Coordinates: 32°10′16″N 48°56′25″E
- Country: Iran
- Province: Khuzestan
- County: Gotvand
- Bakhsh: Aghili
- Rural District: Aghili-ye Jonubi

Population (2006)
  - Total: 483
- Time zone: UTC+3:30 (IRST)
  - Summer (DST): UTC+4:30 (IRDT)

Dehloran, Khuzestan (Persian: دهلران, also Romanized as Dehlorān; also known as Deh Lowrān and Deh Lūrān) is a village in Aghili-ye Jonubi Rural District, Aghili District, Gotvand County, Khuzestan Province, Iran. At the 2006 census, its population was 483, in 104 families.

It is located about 10km northeast of Shushtar (Shushtar County), and about 8km southeast of Gotvand, the capital of Gotvand County.

Dehloran, Khuzestan is located about 170km southeast from the village of the same name in Ilam Province. Dehloran, Ilam is located on Deh Luran plain.

== Archaeology ==
Dehloran, Khuzestan is located in the middle of the Susiana plain. In prehistoric times (Chalcolithic age), this was the area of active settlement, with multiple small villages. The population engaged in agriculture and herding. The important sites on Susiana plain are Susa, and Chogha Mish.
