= Ab Jadan Qoliabad =

Ab Jadan Qoliabad ابجدان قلي اباد
- Village
- Country: Iran
- Province: Khuzestan
- County: Gotvand
- Bakhsh: Central
- Rural District: Kiyaras

Population (2006)
  - Total: 58
- Time zone: UTC+3:30 (IRST)
  - Summer (DST): UTC+4:30 (IRDT)

Ab Jadan Qoliabad (Persian: ابجدان قلي اباد, also Romanized as Āb Jadān Qolīābād) is a village in Kiyaras Rural District, in the Central District of Gotvand County, Khuzestan Province, Iran. At the 2006 census, its population was 58, in 9 families. It is near the population center of Shahrak-e Shahid Mohasan Boni Najar.
