= Bardla =

Bardla بردلا
- Village
- Location within Iran
- Coordinates: 32°12′44″N 48°56′04″E
- Country: Iran
- Province: Khuzestan
- County: Gotvand
- Bakhsh: Aghili
- Rural District: Aghili-ye Jonubi

Population (2006)
  - Total: 321
- Time zone: UTC+3:30 (IRST)
  - Summer (DST): UTC+4:30 (IRDT)

Bardla (Persian: بردلا, also Romanized as Bardlā; also known as Bardāleh, Bard Allāh, Bard-e-Allāh, and Bardollāh) is a village in Aghili-ye Jonubi Rural District, Aghili District, Gotvand County, Khuzestan Province, Iran. At the 2006 census, its population was 321, in 59 families.
