= Boneh-ye Esmail, Khuzestan =

Boneh-ye Esmail بنه اسماعيل
- Village
- Location within Iran
- Coordinates: 32°22′06″N 48°57′08″E
- Country: Iran
- Province: Khuzestan
- County: Gotvand
- Bakhsh: Central
- Rural District: Kiyaras

Population (2006)
  - Total: 53
- Time zone: UTC+3:30 (IRST)
  - Summer (DST): UTC+4:30 (IRDT)

Boneh-ye Esmail (Persian: بنه اسماعيل, also Romanized as Boneh-ye Esmā‘īl; also known as Esmā‘īlābād) is a village in Kiyaras Rural District, in the Central District of Gotvand County, Khuzestan Province, Iran. At the 2006 census, its population was 53, in 12 families.
