= Mianpilun =

Mianpilun ميان پيلون
- Village
- Location within Iran
- Coordinates: 32°24′24″N 48°51′34″E
- Country: Iran
- Province: Khuzestan
- County: Gotvand
- Bakhsh: Central
- Rural District: Kiyaras

Population (2006)
  - Total: 276
- Time zone: UTC+3:30 (IRST)
  - Summer (DST): UTC+4:30 (IRDT)

Mianpilun (Persian: ميان پيلون, also Romanized as Mīānpīlūn; also known as Mīānpalān) is a village in Kiyaras Rural District, in the Central District of Gotvand County, Khuzestan Province, Iran. At the 2006 census, its population was 276, in 51 families.
