= Cham-e Araban Do =

Cham-e Araban Do چم عربان 2
- Village
- Location within Iran
- Coordinates: 32°11′11″N 48°50′44″E
- Country: Iran
- Province: Khuzestan
- County: Gotvand
- Bakhsh: Aghili
- Rural District: Aghili-ye Jonubi

Population (2006)
  - Total: 360
- Time zone: UTC+3:30 (IRST)
  - Summer (DST): UTC+4:30 (IRDT)

Cham-e Araban Do (Persian: چم عربان 2, also Romanized as Cham-e ʿArabān Do; also known as Cham-e ʿArabān) is a village in Aghili-ye Jonubi Rural District, Aghili District, Gotvand County, Khuzestan Province, Iran. At the 2006 census, its population was 360, in 71 families.
