= Chegha Meleh =

Chegha Meleh چغامله
- Village
- Location within Iran
- Coordinates: 32°13′00″N 48°46′04″E
- Country: Iran
- Province: Khuzestan
- County: Gotvand
- Bakhsh: Central
- Rural District: Jannat Makan

Population (2006)
  - Total: 497
- Time zone: UTC+3:30 (IRST)
  - Summer (DST): UTC+4:30 (IRDT)

Chegha Meleh (Persian: چغامله, also Romanized as Cheghā Meleh; also known as Chaughāmale, Cheqāmeleh, Chūghāmeleh, and Chūqām 'alī) is a village in Jannat Makan Rural District, in the Central District of Gotvand County, Khuzestan province, Iran. At the 2006 census, its population was 497, in 81 families.
