= Ab Tasuleh =

Ab Tasuleh اب توصله
- Village
- Location within Iran
- Coordinates: 32°19′41″N 48°45′07″E
- Country: Iran
- Province: Khuzestan
- County: Gotvand
- Bakhsh: Central
- Rural District: Kiyaras

Population (2006)
  - Total: 158
- Time zone: UTC+3:30 (IRST)
  - Summer (DST): UTC+4:30 (IRDT)

Ab Tasuleh (Persian: اب توصله, also Romanized as Āb Tāsūleh) is a village in Kiyaras Rural District, in the Central District of Gotvand County, Khuzestan province, Iran. At the 2006 census, its population was 158, in 25 families.
