= Mohammad Safiyeh =

Mohammad Safiyeh محمدصفيه
- Village
- Location within Iran
- Coordinates: 32°12′09″N 48°52′29″E
- Country: Iran
- Province: Khuzestan
- County: Gotvand
- Bakhsh: Aghili
- Rural District: Aghili-ye Shomali

Population (2006)
  - Total: 78
- Time zone: UTC+3:30 (IRST)
  - Summer (DST): UTC+4:30 (IRDT)

Mohammad Safiyeh (Persian: محمدصفيه, also Romanized as Moḩammad Şafīyeh; also known as Moḩammad Şa‘īyeh) is a village in Aghili-ye Shomali Rural District, Aghili District, Gotvand County, Khuzestan Province, Iran. At the 2006 census, its population was 78, in 15 families.
