= Salamgah =

Salamgah سلامگاه
- Village
- Location within Iran
- Coordinates: 32°22′24″N 48°54′16″E
- Country: Iran
- Province: Khuzestan
- County: Gotvand
- Bakhsh: Central
- Rural District: Kiyaras

Population (2006)
  - Total: 557
- Time zone: UTC+3:30 (IRST)
  - Summer (DST): UTC+4:30 (IRDT)

Salamgah (Persian: سلامگاه, also Romanized as Salāmgāh) is a village in Kiyaras Rural District, in the Central District of Gotvand County, Khuzestan Province, Iran. At the 2006 census, its population was 557, in 89 families.
