= Seyyedan (disambiguation) =

Seyyedan is a city in Fars Province, Iran.

Seyyedan or Sayyedan or Saidan or Sidan or Saydan (Persian: سيدان), some times rendered as Saiyideh, may also refer to:

- Seyyedan, East Azerbaijan
- Seyyedan, Gilan
- Seyyedan, Isfahan
- Sidan, alternate name of Sereyan, Isfahan Province
- Seyyedan, Khuzestan
- Seyyedan, alternate name of Istadegi, Khuzestan Province
- Seyyedan, Kurdistan
- Seyyedan, Darmian, South Khorasan Province
- Seyyedan, Khusf, South Khorasan Province
- Seyyedan District, in Fars Province
- Seyyedan Rural District, in East Azerbaijan Province

== See also ==
- Baveleh-ye Seyyedan, West Azerbaijan Province, Iran
- Seydan (disambiguation)
