= Boneh-ye Morteza =

Boneh-ye Morteza بنه مرتضي
- Village
- Location within Iran
- Coordinates: 32°09′05″N 48°52′57″E
- Country: Iran
- Province: Khuzestan
- County: Gotvand
- Bakhsh: Aghili
- Rural District: Aghili-ye Jonubi

Population (2006)
  - Total: 311
- Time zone: UTC+3:30 (IRST)
  - Summer (DST): UTC+4:30 (IRDT)

Boneh-ye Morteza (Persian: بنه مرتضي, also Romanized as Boneh-ye Morteẕá; also known as Boneh Mortezā) is a village in Aghili-ye Jonubi Rural District, Aghili District, Gotvand County, Khuzestan Province, Iran. At the 2006 census, its population was 311, in 56 families.
