= Chin Owlak =

Chin Owlak چينولك
- Village
- Location within Iran
- Coordinates: 32°19′33″N 48°58′34″E
- Country: Iran
- Province: Khuzestan
- County: Gotvand
- Bakhsh: Central
- Rural District: Kiyaras

Population (2006)
  - Total: 37
- Time zone: UTC+3:30 (IRST)
  - Summer (DST): UTC+4:30 (IRDT)

Chin Owlak (Persian: چينولك, also Romanized as Chīn Owl'ak) is a village in Kiyaras Rural District, in the Central District of Gotvand County, Khuzestan Province, Iran. At the 2006 census, its population was 37, in with families.
