= Posht Darb-e Vosta =

Posht Darb-e Vosta پشت درب وسطي
- Village
- Location within Iran
- Coordinates: 32°13′01″N 48°54′11″E
- Country: Iran
- Province: Khuzestan
- County: Gotvand
- Bakhsh: Aghili
- Rural District: Aghili-ye Shomali

Population (2006)
  - Total: 196
- Time zone: UTC+3:30 (IRST)
  - Summer (DST): UTC+4:30 (IRDT)

Posht Darb-e Vosta (Persian: پشت درب وسطي, also romanized as Posht Darb-e Vostá; also known as Dareynak and Darnīk) is a village in Aghili-ye Shomali Rural District, Aghili District, Gotvand County, Khuzestan Province, Iran. At the 2006 census, its population was 196, in 30 families.
