= Badil =

Badil may refer to:

- Badil, Iran, a village in Khuzestan Province, Iran
- Al-badil (disambiguation), Arabic for the alternative
- Crystal violet, by the trade name Badil
- BADIL Resource Center for Palestinian Residency and Refugee Rights

== See also ==
- Al-badil
