= Naser Balivand =

Naser Balivand ناصربليوند
- Village
- Country: Iran
- Province: Khuzestan
- County: Gotvand
- Bakhsh: Central
- Rural District: Kiyaras

Population (2006)
  - Total: 24
- Time zone: UTC+3:30 (IRST)
  - Summer (DST): UTC+4:30 (IRDT)

Naser Balivand (Persian: ناصربليوند, also Romanized as Nāṣer Balīvand) is a village in Kiyaras Rural District, in the Central District of Gotvand County, Khuzestan Province, Iran. At the 2006 census, its population was 24, in 4 families.
