= Kaydan =

Kaydan كايدان
- Village
- Location within Iran
- Coordinates: 32°11′40″N 48°54′14″E
- Country: Iran
- Province: Khuzestan
- County: Gotvand
- Bakhsh: Aghili
- Rural District: Aghili-ye Jonubi

Population (2006)
  - Total: 796
- Time zone: UTC+3:30 (IRST)
  - Summer (DST): UTC+4:30 (IRDT)

Kaydan (Persian: كايدان, also Romanized as Kāydān and Kayedan; also known as Kāydūn, Koidūn, Koweydān, and Kowydān) is a village in Aghili-ye Jonubi Rural District, Aghili District, Gotvand County, Khuzestan Province, Iran. At the 2006 census, its population was 796, in 150 families.
