= Deh-e Piran =

Deh-e Piran (Persian: ده پيران) may refer to:

- Deh-e Piran, Khuzestan
- Deh-e Piran, Sistan and Baluchestan

== See also ==
- Piran (disambiguation)
