= Aghili =

Aghili or Aghily may refer to:

- Hadi Aghily (born 1981), Iranian footballer
- Aghili District, Gotvand County, Khuzestan Province, Iran
  - Aghili-ye Jonubi Rural District, Aghili District
  - Aghili-ye Shomali Rural District, Aghili District
