= Boneh-ye Heydar =

Boneh-ye Heydar بنه حيدر
- Village
- Location within Iran
- Coordinates: 32°15′25″N 49°21′17″E
- Country: Iran
- Province: Khuzestan
- County: Gotvand
- Bakhsh: Aghili
- Rural District: Aghili-ye Shomali

Population (2006)
  - Total: 447
- Time zone: UTC+3:30 (IRST)
  - Summer (DST): UTC+4:30 (IRDT)

Boneh-ye Heydar (Persian: بنه حيدر, also Romanized as Boneh-ye Ḩeydar) is a village in Aghili-ye Shomali Rural District, Aghili District, Gotvand County, Khuzestan Province, Iran. At the 2006 census, its population was 447, in 84 families.
