= Boneh-ye Kazem Jamal =

Boneh-ye Kazem Jamal بنه كاظم جمال
- Village
- Location within Iran
- Coordinates: 32°12′42″N 48°52′36″E
- Country: Iran
- Province: Khuzestan
- County: Gotvand
- Bakhsh: Aghili
- Rural District: Aghili-ye Jonubi

Population (2006)
  - Total: 780
- Time zone: UTC+3:30 (IRST)
  - Summer (DST): UTC+4:30 (IRDT)

Boneh-ye Kazem Jamal (Persian: بنه كاظم جمال, also Romanized as Boneh-ye Kāz̧em Jamāl; also known as Boneh-ye Kāz̧em) is a village in Aghili-ye Jonubi Rural District, Aghili District, Gotvand County, Khuzestan Province, Iran. At the 2006 census, its population was 780, in 146 families.
