= Boneh-ye Kazem Hajj Soltan =

Boneh-ye Kazem Hajj Soltan بنه كاظم حاج سلطان
- Village
- Location within Iran
- Coordinates: 32°13′00″N 48°52′00″E
- Country: Iran
- Province: Khuzestan
- County: Gotvand
- Bakhsh: Aghili
- Rural District: Aghili-ye Shomali

Population (2007)
  - Total: 596
- Time zone: UTC+3:30 (IRST)
  - Summer (DST): UTC+4:30 (IRDT)

Boneh-ye Kazem Hajj Soltan (Persian: بنه كاظم حاج سلطان, also Romanized as Boneh-ye Kāz̧em Ḩājj Solţān; also known as Ḩājj Solţān) is a village in Aghili-ye Shomali Rural District, Aghili District, Gotvand County, Khuzestan Province, Iran. At the 2006 census, its population was 596, in 122 families.
