= Farajabad =

Farajabad and Farjabad (Persian: فرج اباد) may refer to:

- Farajabad, Ardabil
- Farajabad, Isfahan
- Farajabad, Gotvand, Khuzestan Province
- Farajabad, Lali, Khuzestan Province
- Farajabad, Kurdistan
- Farajabad, Khomeyn, Markazi Province
- Farajabad, Zarandieh, Markazi Province
- Farajabad, Chalus, Mazandaran Province
- Farajabad, Juybar, Mazandaran Province
- Farajabad, Qom
