= Seleh Chin-e Sofla =

Seleh Chin-e Sofla سله چين سفلي
- Village
- Location within Iran
- Coordinates: 32°11′53″N 48°46′08″E
- Country: Iran
- Province: Khuzestan
- County: Gotvand
- Bakhsh: Central
- Rural District: Jannat Makan

Population (2006)
  - Total: 582
- Time zone: UTC+3:30 (IRST)
  - Summer (DST): UTC+4:30 (IRDT)

Seleh Chin-e Sofla (Persian: سله چين سفلي, also Romanized as Seleh Chīn-e Soflá; also known as Deh Sanjā, Deh Sanjāb, and Selechīn) is a village in Jannat Makan Rural District, in the Central District of Gotvand County, Khuzestan Province, Iran. At the 2006 census, its population was 582, in 111 families.
