= Pol-e Parzin =

Village in Khuzestan province, Iran

Pol-e Parzin Persian: پل پرزين
- Village
- Location within Iran
- Coordinates: 32°21′59″N 48°50′20″E
- Country: Iran
- Province: Khuzestan
- County: Gotvand
- District: Central
- Rural District: Kiyaras

Population (2016)
  - Total: 398
- Time zone: UTC+3:30 (IRST)

Pol-e Parzin (Persian: پل پرزين) (Note: Also romanized as Pol-e Parzīn) is a village in, and the capital of, Kiyaras Rural District of the Central District of Gotvand County, Khuzestan province, Iran.

== Demographics ==
=== Population ===
At the time of the 2006 National Census, the village's population was 297 in 52 households. The following census in 2011 counted 300 people in 62 households. The 2016 census measured the population of the village as 398 people in 75 households.
