= Seyyedan, Khuzestan =

Seyyedan سيدان
- Village
- Location within Iran
- Coordinates: 32°10′38″N 48°51′47″E
- Country: Iran
- Province: Khuzestan
- County: Gotvand
- Bakhsh: Aghili
- Rural District: Aghili-ye Jonubi

Population (2006)
  - Total: 1,079
- Time zone: UTC+3:30 (IRST)
  - Summer (DST): UTC+4:30 (IRDT)

Seyyedan (Persian: سيدان, also Romanized as Seyyedān; also known as Saiyideh) is a village in Aghili-ye Jonubi Rural District, Aghili District, Gotvand County, Khuzestan Province, Iran. At the 2006 census, its population was 1,079, in 211 families.
