= Seydan =

Seydan may refer to:

- Seyidan, a village and municipality in Azerbaijan
- Seydan, Kurdistan, a village in Iran
- Seydan, Bijar, Kurdistan Province, a village in Iran
- Seydan, West Azerbaijan, a village in Iran
- Seydun, a city in Iran
- Seyyedan, a city in Iran
- Seydan, alternate name of Farah Kosh-e Olya, a village in Iran

== See also ==
- Seyyedan (disambiguation)
