= Mundoni =

Mundoni موندني
- Village
- Location within Iran
- Coordinates: 32°10′37″N 48°53′55″E
- Country: Iran
- Province: Khuzestan
- County: Gotvand
- Bakhsh: Aghili
- Rural District: Aghili-ye Jonubi

Population (2006)
  - Total: 584
- Time zone: UTC+3:30 (IRST)
  - Summer (DST): UTC+4:30 (IRDT)

Mundoni (Persian: موندني, also Romanized as Mūndonī, Mowndanī, and Mūndanī; also known as Māndanī, Mīmdani, and Mondonī) is a village in Aghili-ye Jonubi Rural District, Aghili District, Gotvand County, Khuzestan Province, Iran. At the 2006 census, its population was 584, in 127 families.
