= Farajabad, Gotvand =

Farajabad فرج اباد
- Village
- Location within Iran
- Coordinates: 32°22′05″N 48°54′52″E
- Country: Iran
- Province: Khuzestan
- County: Gotvand
- Bakhsh: Central
- Rural District: Kiyaras

Population (2006)
  - Total: 78
- Time zone: UTC+3:30 (IRST)
  - Summer (DST): UTC+4:30 (IRDT)

Farajabad (Persian: فرج اباد, also Romanized as Farajābād) is a village in Kiyaras Rural District, in the Central District of Gotvand County, Khuzestan Province, Iran. At the 2006 census, its population was 78, in 14 families.
