= Do Piran =

Do Piran (Persian: دوپيران) may refer to:

- Do Piran, Gotvand
- Do Piran, Ramhormoz
