= Dasht-e Bozorg =

Village in Khuzestan province, Iran

Dasht-e Bozorg Persian: دشت بزرگ
- Village
- Location within Iran
- Coordinates: 32°07′03″N 48°55′29″E
- Country: Iran
- Province: Khuzestan
- County: Gotvand
- District: Aghili
- Rural District: Aghili-ye Jonubi

Population (2016)
  - Total: 857
- Time zone: UTC+3:30 (IRST)

Dasht-e Bozorg (Persian: دشت بزرگ) (Note: Also romanized as Dasht Bozorg; also known as Dasht-ī-Būzūrg) is a village in, and the capital of, Aghili-ye Jonubi Rural District of Aghili District, Gotvand County, Khuzestan province, Iran.

== Demographics ==
=== Population ===
At the time of the 2006 National Census, the village's population was 804 in 168 households. The following census in 2011 counted 794 people in 195 households. The 2016 census measured the population of the village as 857 people in 235 households.
