= Zolmabad, Khuzestan =

Village in Khuzestan province, Iran

Zolmabad Persian: ظلماباد
- Village
- Location within Iran
- Coordinates: 32°08′26″N 48°54′53″E
- Country: Iran
- Province: Khuzestan
- County: Gotvand
- District: Aghili
- Rural District: Aghili-ye Jonubi

Population (2016)
  - Total: 1,879
- Time zone: UTC+3:30 (IRST)

Zolmabad (Persian: ظلماباد) (Note: Also romanized as Z̧olmābād; also known as Shahrak-e Shahīd Madanī) is a village in Aghili-ye Jonubi Rural District of Aghili District, Gotvand County, Khuzestan province, Iran.

== Demographics ==
=== Population ===
At the time of the 2006 National Census, the village's population was 1,714 in 313 households. The following census in 2011 counted 1,958 people in 422 households. The 2016 census measured the population of the village as 1,879 people in 468 households. It was the most populous village in its rural district.
