= Ab Bid-e Alibaz =

Ab Bid-e Alibaz اب بيدعلي باز
- Village
- Location within Iran
- Coordinates: 32°16′47″N 48°43′47″E
- Country: Iran
- Province: Khuzestan
- County: Gotvand
- Bakhsh: Central
- Rural District: Kiyaras

Population (2006)
  - Total: 280
- Time zone: UTC+3:30 (IRST)
  - Summer (DST): UTC+4:30 (IRDT)

Ab Bid-e Alibaz (Persian: اب بيدعلي باز, also Romanized as Āb Bīd-e ‘Alībāz; also known as Āb Bīd, Āb Bīd ‘Alī, and Āb-ī-Bīd) is a village in Kiyaras Rural District, in the Central District of Gotvand County, Khuzestan Province, Iran. At the 2006 census, its population was 280, in 49 families.
