= Seleh Chin =

Seleh Chin or Selehchin (Persian: سله چين) may refer to:

- Seleh Chin-e Olya
- Seleh Chin-e Sofla
