= Istadegi =

Istadegi ايستادگي
- Village
- Location within Iran
- Coordinates: 32°13′00″N 48°50′35″E
- Country: Iran
- Province: Khuzestan
- County: Gotvand
- Bakhsh: Aghili
- Rural District: Aghili-ye Shomali

Population (2006)
  - Total: 817
- Time zone: UTC+3:30 (IRST)
  - Summer (DST): UTC+4:30 (IRDT)

Istadegi (Persian: ايستادگي, also Romanized as Īstādegī and Estādegī; also known as Estegī, Istegī, Saiyidān, and Seyyedān) is a village in Aghili-ye Shomali Rural District, Aghili District, Gotvand County, Khuzestan Province, Iran. At the 2006 census, its population was 817, in 167 families.
