= Cham Chit, Khuzestan =

Cham Chit چم چيت
- Village
- Location within Iran
- Coordinates: 32°24′19″N 48°54′43″E
- Country: Iran
- Province: Khuzestan
- County: Gotvand
- Bakhsh: Central
- Rural District: Kiyaras

Population (2006)
  - Total: 76
- Time zone: UTC+3:30 (IRST)
  - Summer (DST): UTC+4:30 (IRDT)

Cham Chit (Persian: چم چيت, also Romanized as Cham Chīt and Cham-e Chīt) is a village in Kiyaras Rural District, in the Central District of Gotvand County, Khuzestan Province, Iran. At the 2006 census, its population was 76, in 11 families.
