= Ahangari =

Ahangari (Persian: اهنگري) may refer to:

- Ahangari, Fars
- Ahangari, Khuzestan
- Ahangari, Lorestan
