= Rudani =

Rudani رودني
- Village
- Location within Iran
- Coordinates: 32°08′52″N 48°53′47″E
- Country: Iran
- Province: Khuzestan
- County: Gotvand
- Bakhsh: Aghili
- Rural District: Aghili-ye Jonubi

Population (2006)
  - Total: 69
- Time zone: UTC+3:30 (IRST)
  - Summer (DST): UTC+4:30 (IRDT)

Rudani (Persian: رودني, also Romanized as Rūdāni, Rūdney, Rowdenī, and Rūdaney; also known as Radney and Rūney) is a village in Aghili-ye Jonubi Rural District, Aghili District, Gotvand County, Khuzestan province, Iran.

== Demographics ==
At the 2006 census, its population was 69, consisting of 16 families.
