= Piran (disambiguation) =

Saint Piran (6th century), is the patron saint of Cornwall.

Piran may also refer to:

- Piran a town and municipality in Slovenia.
- Piran, Azerbaijan, a village in Azerbaijan
- Piran, Chaharmahal and Bakhtiari, a village in Chaharmahal and Bakhtiari Province, Iran
- Piran, a Kurdish tribe
- Piran, is a small town in northern Erbil Governorate in Kurdistan Region
- Piran, Kermanshah, a village in Kermanshah Province, Iran
- Piran, Hirmand, a village in Sistan and Baluchestan Province, Iran
- Piran Rural District, in West Azerbaijan Province, Iran
- Pîran, Turkey, the Kurdish name for the city of Dicle
- Gulf of Piran, a gulf in the northern Adriatic Sea
- Piran-e Pir, "Master of Masters", an epithet of the Sufi Abdul Qadir Jilani.

== See also ==
- Pirhan, a village in Cyprus
