= Shahrak-e Panjom =

Village in Khuzestan province, Iran

Shahrak-e Panjom Persian: شهرك پنجم
- Village
- Location within Iran
- Coordinates: 32°08′05″N 48°45′21″E
- Country: Iran
- Province: Khuzestan
- County: Gotvand
- District: Central
- Rural District: Jannat Makan

Population (2016)
  - Total: 2,660
- Time zone: UTC+3:30 (IRST)

Shahrak-e Panjom (Persian: شهرك پنجم) (Note: Also romanized as Shahrak-e Panjam) is a village in Jannat Makan Rural District of the Central District of Gotvand County, Khuzestan province, Iran.

== Demographics ==
=== Population ===
At the time of the 2006 National Census, the village's population was 518 in 89 households. The following census in 2011 counted 1,711 people in 338 households. The 2016 census measured the population of the village as 2,660 people in 584 households. It was the most populous village in its rural district.
