= Ahangari, Khuzestan =

Ahangari اهنگري
- Village
- Location within Iran
- Coordinates: 32°20′47″N 48°56′43″E
- Country: Iran
- Province: Khuzestan
- County: Gotvand
- Bakhsh: Central
- Rural District: Kiyaras

Population (2006)
  - Total: 63
- Time zone: UTC+3:30 (IRST)
  - Summer (DST): UTC+4:30 (IRDT)

Ahangari (Persian: اهنگري, also Romanized as Āhangarī) is a village in Kiyaras Rural District, in the Central District of Gotvand County, Khuzestan Province, Iran. At the 2006 census, its population was 63, in 9 families.
