= Ab Bid-e Hajj Baba =

Ab Bid-e Hajj Baba اب بيدحاجي بابا
- Village
- Location within Iran
- Coordinates: 32°15′35″N 48°43′35″E
- Country: Iran
- Province: Khuzestan
- County: Gotvand
- Bakhsh: Central
- Rural District: Kiyaras

Population (2006)
  - Total: 336
- Time zone: UTC+3:30 (IRST)
  - Summer (DST): UTC+4:30 (IRDT)

Ab Bid-e Hajj Baba (Persian: اب بيدحاجي بابا, also Romanized as Āb Bīd-e Ḩājj Bābā; also known as Āb Bīd-e Ḩājjī Bābā and Ab Bīd-e Hājī Bābā, and Āb-e Bīd) is a village in Kiyaras Rural District, in the Central District of Gotvand County, Khuzestan Province, Iran. At the 2006 census, its population was 336, in 53 families.
