= Abid, Iran =

Abid (Persian: ابيد or عبيد) may refer to:

- Abid, Dezful, Khuzestan Province (ابيد - Abīd)
- Abid, Shush, Khuzestan Province (عبيد - ‘Abīd)

== See also ==
- Ab Bid (disambiguation)
