= Cham Chit =

Cham Chit or Cham-e Chit (Persian: چم چيت) may refer to:

- Cham Chit, Khuzestan
- Cham Chit, Lorestan
