= Seleh Chin-e Olya =

Seleh Chin-e Olya سله چين عليا
- Village
- Location within Iran
- Coordinates: 32°12′00″N 48°48′00″E
- Country: Iran
- Province: Khuzestan
- County: Gotvand
- Bakhsh: Central
- Rural District: Jannat Makan

Population (2006)
  - Total: 15
- Time zone: UTC+3:30 (IRST)
  - Summer (DST): UTC+4:30 (IRDT)

Seleh Chin-e Olya (Persian: سله چين عليا, also Romanized as Seleh Chīn-e ‘Olyā; also known as Salahchīn, Selehchīn, and Selehchīn-e Sorlā) is a village in Jannat Makan Rural District, in the Central District of Gotvand County, Khuzestan Province, Iran. At the 2006 census, its population was 15, in 4 families.
