= Mundani =

Mundani may refer to:

- Mundani language
- Mundani, Iran
