= Shahrak-e Shahid Mohasan Boni Najar =

Village in Khuzestan province, Iran

Shahrak-e Shahid Mohasan Boni Najar Persian: شهرك شهيدمحسن بني نجار
- Village
- Location within Iran
- Coordinates: 32°15′11″N 48°46′44″E
- Country: Iran
- Province: Khuzestan
- County: Gotvand
- District: Central
- Rural District: Kiyaras

Population (2016)
  - Total: 1,851
- Time zone: UTC+3:30 (IRST)

Shahrak-e Shahid Mohasan Boni Najar (Persian: شهرك شهيدمحسن بني نجار) (Note: Also romanized as Shahrak-e Shahīd Moḥasan Bonī Najār) is a village in Kiyaras Rural District of the Central District of Gotvand County, Khuzestan province, Iran.

== Demographics ==
=== Population ===
At the time of the 2006 National Census, the village's population was 114 in 21 households. The following census in 2011 counted 2,020 people in 390 households. The 2016 census measured the population of the village as 1,851 people in 334 households. It was the most populous village in its rural district.
