= Radney =

Radney may refer to:

- Radney, Iran, a village in Khuzestan Province, Iran
- Radney Foster (born 1959), American singer-songwriter
- Radney Bowker (born 1979), English rugby player
- Tom Radney (1932–2011), American politician
