= Adavad =

Town in Maharashtra, India

Adavad Adawad, Adwad
- Village
- Location within Maharashtra Location within India
- Coordinates: 21°13′35″N 75°25′41″E
- Country: India
- State: Maharashtra
- District: Jalgaon
- Taluka: Chopda

Government
  - Type: Sarpanch

Area
  - Total: 4 km^{2} (1.5 sq mi)
- Elevation: 195 m (640 ft)

Population (2011)
  - Total: 24,357
  - Density: 6,100/km^{2} (16,000/sq mi)

Languages
  - Official Language: Marathi
  - Other languages: Urdu, Hindi, Marvari, Ahirani, English
- Time zone: UTC+5:30 (IST)
- PIN: 425303
- Telephone STD code: 02586
- Vehicle registration: MH-19

Adavad, also spelt Adawad or Adwad, is a village in the Chopda Tehsil of Jalgaon District, Maharashtra, India. It is situated at the southern base of the Satpura Hills, about 30 kilometres northwest of the district seat Jalgaon, and 13 kilometres east of the subdistrict seat Chopda. As of the year 2011, it has a total population of 24,357.

== Geography ==
Adavad is located on the north of Tapti River. It is bounded by the village of Khardi to the north, the village of Panchak to the east, the village of Vadgaon Bk. to the south, and the village of Mangrul to the west. Its average elevation is at 195 metres above the sea level.

== Climate ==
Adavad has a Tropical Savanna Climate. It sees the most rainfall in July, with an average precipitation of 279 mm; and the least amount of rainfall in January, with an average precipitation of 2 mm.

Climate data for Adavad
Month	Jan	Feb	Mar	Apr	May	Jun	Jul	Aug	Sep	Oct	Nov	Dec	Year
Mean daily maximum °C (°F)	28.2 (82.8)	31.3 (88.3)	35.7 (96.3)	39.7 (103.5)	40.1 (104.2)	35.3 (95.5)	29.8 (85.6)	28.8 (83.8)	30.3 (86.5)	32.3 (90.1)	30.8 (87.4)	28.5 (83.3)	32.6 (90.6)
Daily mean °C (°F)	21.2 (70.2)	24 (75)	28.1 (82.6)	32.2 (90.0)	33.2 (91.8)	30.3 (86.5)	26.8 (80.2)	25.9 (78.6)	26.5 (79.7)	26.6 (79.9)	24.3 (75.7)	21.6 (70.9)	26.7 (80.1)
Mean daily minimum °C (°F)	14.4 (57.9)	16.5 (61.7)	19.9 (67.8)	24.1 (75.4)	26.5 (79.7)	26.1 (79.0)	24.4 (75.9)	23.6 (74.5)	23.2 (73.8)	21 (70)	18 (64)	15.1 (59.2)	21.1 (69.9)
Average rainfall mm (inches)	2 (0.1)	2 (0.1)	3 (0.1)	2 (0.1)	6 (0.2)	129 (5.1)	279 (11.0)	278 (10.9)	172 (6.8)	46 (1.8)	9 (0.4)	5 (0.2)	933 (36.8)
Source: Climate-Data.org

== Demographics ==
According to the 2011 Indian Census, Adavad (appeared as Adwad in the census record) has a total of 4,855 households. Among the 24,357 residents, 12,577 are male and 11,780 are female. The literacy rate is at 54.12%, with 7,393 of the male population and 5,789 of the female population being literate. The census location code is 526729.
