= Do Piran, Gotvand =

Do Piran دوپيران
- Village
- Location within Iran
- Coordinates: 32°06′00″N 48°52′00″E
- Country: Iran
- Province: Khuzestan
- County: Gotvand
- Bakhsh: Central
- Rural District: Jannat Makan

Population (2006)
  - Total: 121
- Time zone: UTC+3:30 (IRST)
  - Summer (DST): UTC+4:30 (IRDT)

Do Piran (Persian: دوپيران, also Romanized as Do Pīrān; also known as Deh-e Pīrān) is a village in Jannat Makan Rural District, in the Central District of Gotvand County, Khuzestan Province, Iran. At the 2006 census, its population was 121, in 24 families.
