= Torkalaki =

City in Khuzestan province, Iran

Torkalaki Persian: تركالكي
- City
- Location within Iran
- Coordinates: 32°14′35″N 48°50′51″E
- Country: Iran
- Province: Khuzestan
- County: Gotvand
- District: Aghili

Population (2016)
  - Total: 5,688
- Time zone: UTC+3:30 (IRST)

Torkalaki (Persian: تركالكي) (Note: Also romanized as Torkālakī) is a city in Aghili District of Gotvand County, Khuzestan province, Iran.

== Demographics ==
=== Population ===
At the time of the 2006 National Census, Torkalaki's population was 5,300 in 1,047 households, when it was a village in Aghili-ye Shomali Rural District. (Note: Formerly Aghili Rural District) The following census in 2011 counted 5,654 people in 1,380 households, by which time the village had been elevated to the status of a city. The 2016 census measured the population of the city as 5,688 people in 1,585 households.
