= Saleh Shahr =

City in Khuzestan province, Iran

Saleh Shahr Persian: صالح شهر
- City
- Location within Iran
- Coordinates: 32°12′48″N 48°40′17″E
- Country: Iran
- Province: Khuzestan
- County: Gotvand
- District: Central

Population (2016)
  - Total: 7,309
- Time zone: UTC+3:30 (IRST)

Saleh Shahr (Persian: صالح شهر) (Note: Formerly Shahrak-e Shahid Chamran (شهرك شهيدچمران), also romanized as Shahrak-e Shahīd Chamrān) is a city in the Central District of Gotvand County, Khuzestan province, Iran.

== Demographics ==
=== Population ===
At the time of the 2006 National Census, the population was 7,347 in 1,401 households, when it was the village of Shahrak-e Shahid Chamran in Jannat Makan Rural District. The following census in 2011 counted 7,779 people in 1,764 households, by which time the village had been elevated to city status as Saleh Shahr. The 2016 census measured the population of the city as 7,309 people in 1,814 households.
