= Badil, Iran =

Village in Khuzestan province, Iran

Badil Persian: بديل
- Village
- Location within Iran
- Coordinates: 32°12′05″N 48°52′32″E
- Country: Iran
- Province: Khuzestan
- County: Gotvand
- District: Aghili
- Rural District: Aghili-ye Shomali

Population (2016)
  - Total: 965
- Time zone: UTC+3:30 (IRST)

Badil (Persian: بديل) (Note: Also romanized as Badīl) is a village in Aghili-ye Shomali Rural District (Note: Formerly Aghili Rural District) of Aghili District, Gotvand County, Khuzestan province, Iran.

== Demographics ==
=== Population ===
At the time of the 2006 National Census, the village's population was 972 in 196 households. The following census in 2011 counted 1,002 people in 252 households. The 2016 census measured the population of the village as 965 people in 257 households. It was the most populous village in its rural district.
