= Veysi =

Veysi (Persian: ویسی) may refer to:

- Veysi, Behbahan
- Veysi, Gotvand
