= Jannat Makan =

City in Khuzestan province, Iran

Jannat Makan Persian: جنت مكان
- City
- Location within Iran
- Coordinates: 32°11′01″N 48°48′53″E
- Country: Iran
- Province: Khuzestan
- County: Gotvand
- District: Central

Population (2016)
  - Total: 5,360
- Time zone: UTC+3:30 (IRST)

Jannat Makan (Persian: جنت مكان) (Note: Also romanized as Jannat Makān; also known as Jalakān, Jallākān, and Jallekān) is a city in the Central District of Gotvand County, Khuzestan province, Iran, serving as the administrative center for Jannat Makan Rural District.

== Demographics ==
=== Population ===
At the time of the 2006 National Census, Jannat Makan's population was 5,893 in 1,086 households, when it was a village in Jannat Makan Rural District. The following census in 2011 counted 6,020 people in 1,360 households, by which time the village had been elevated to the status of a city. The 2016 census measured the population of the city as 5,360 people in 1,475 households.
