= Somaleh =

City in Khuzestan province, Iran

Somaleh Persian: سماله
- City
- Location within Iran
- Coordinates: 32°11′57″N 48°51′33″E
- Country: Iran
- Province: Khuzestan
- County: Gotvand
- District: Aghili

Population (2016)
  - Total: 1,784
- Time zone: UTC+3:30 (IRST)

Somaleh (Persian: سماله (Note: Also romanized as Somāleh; also known as Simāleh) is a city in, and the capital of, Aghili District of Gotvand County, Khuzestan province, Iran. It also serves as the administrative center for Aghili-ye Shomali Rural District. (Note: Formerly Aghili Rural District)

== Demographics ==
=== Population ===
At the time of the 2006 National Census, Somaleh's population was 1,430 in 298 households, when it was a village in Aghili-ye Shomali Rural District. The following census in 2011 counted 1,606 people in 388 households, by which time the village had been elevated to the status of a city. The 2016 census measured the population of the city as 1,784 people in 438 households.
