= Lali Bridge =

Cable-stayed bridge in Khuzestan, Iran

Lali bridge
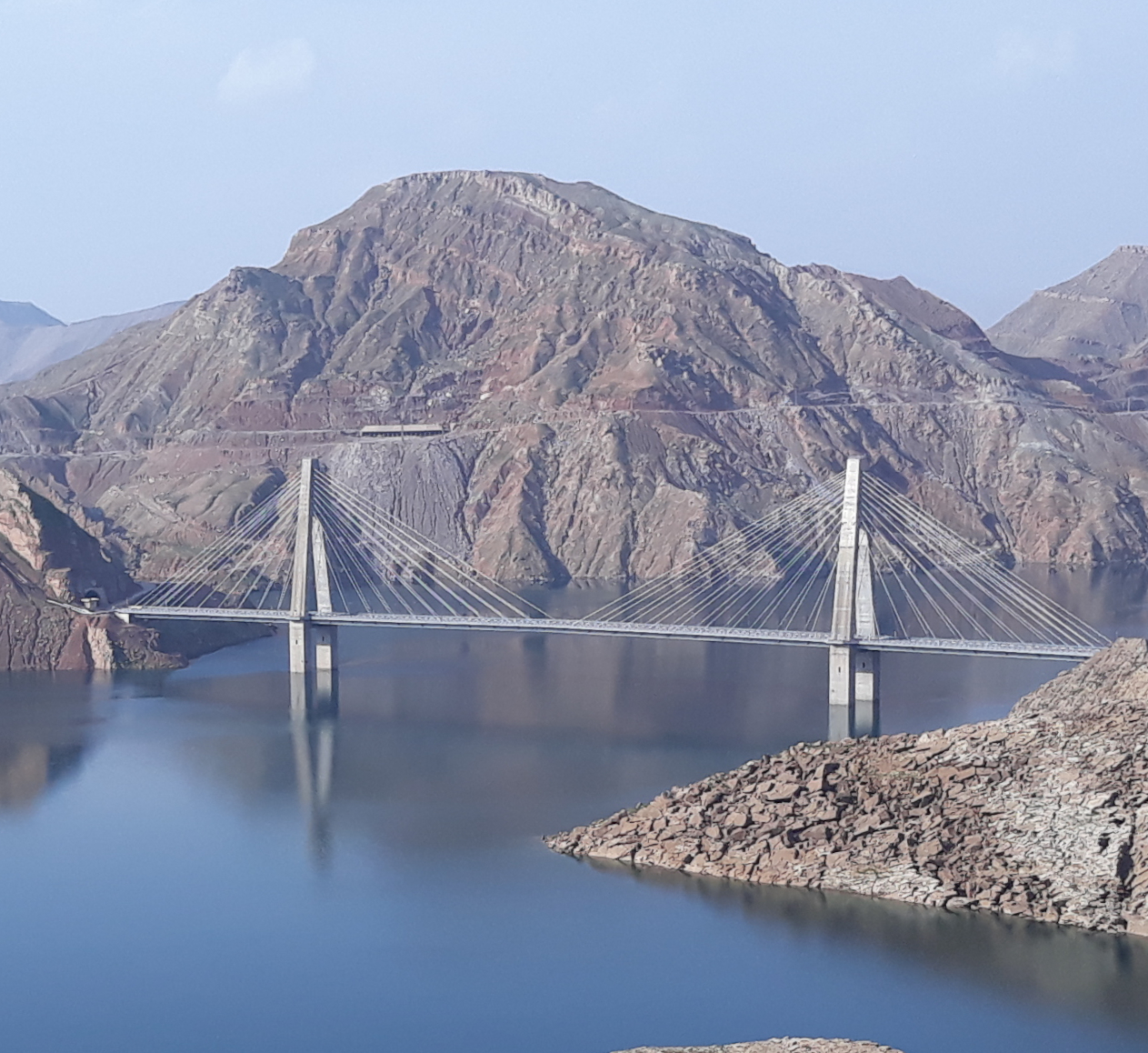
- Coordinates: 32°15′49″N 49°04′41″E
- Locale: Khuzestan, Iran

Characteristics
- Design: Cable-stayed bridge
- Total length: 460 meters (1,510 ft)
- Width: 135 meters (443 ft)
- Height: 75 meters (246 ft)
- Longest span: 256 meters (840 ft)

History
- Construction cost: Rls.184 billion
- Opened: July 2011

The Lali cable bridge (Persian: پل لالی) is a cable-stayed bridge in Khuzestan, Iran. This cable-stayed bridge is located south of the city of Lali, in the Khuzestan province and with a central span of 256 metres is the longest cable-stayed bridge in Iran. Lali cable bridge was built to connect the two cities of Lali and Masjed Soleyman, as well as to establish communication between oil and gas fields on both sides of Gotvand Lake. It supports two lanes of traffic as well as oil and gas pipelines. Bridge was put into operation in July 2011.

== History ==
Lali cable bridge was one of the side projects of Gotvand Olya dam and power plant. In fact, this bridge was an alternative to another bridge that was submerged during the completion of construction and when the dam was flooded. The bridge was located about three kilometers from the Lali cable bridge.

== See also ==
Upper Gotvand dam
