= Karun 4 Arch Bridge =

Bridge in Lordegan County, Iran

Coordinates: 31.6414°N 50.4900°E

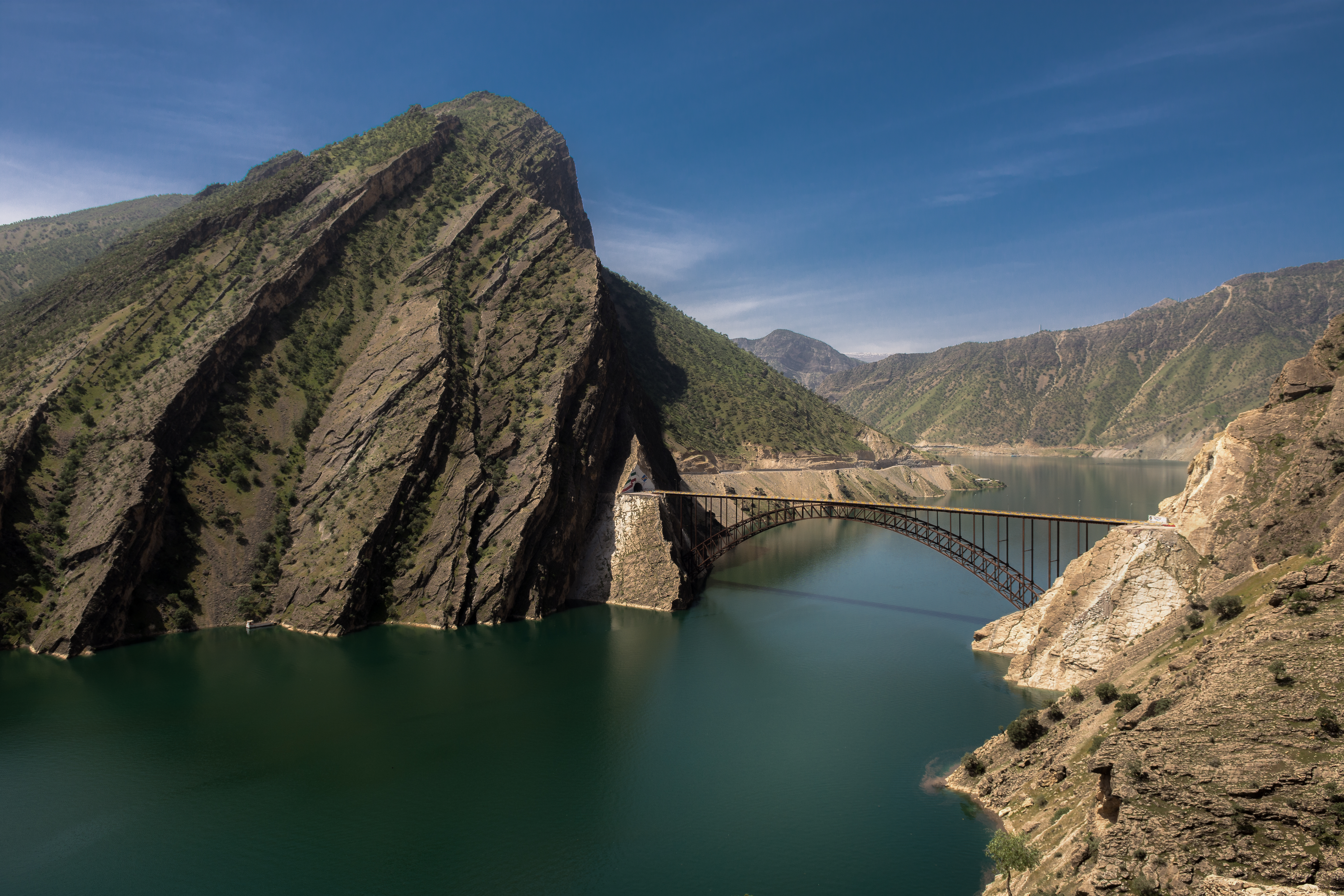

The Karun 4 (Karun IV) Arch Bridge is an arch deck bridge in Lordegan, Chaharmahal and Bakhtiari province, Iran.

It has a 378 metres (1,240 ft) arch span. The 378 metres (1,240 ft) total length of the bridge comprises 15+17+300+17+17+12m span arrangement. This arch deck bridge has an orthotropic deck system with 11.8 metres (39 ft) total width which incorporates a two-way carriageway and a walkway at each side. It weighs 3875 tons and is constructed of 1212 pieces. The bridge construction finished in 2013 and opened to traffic in 2015.

The bridge flies over Karun-4 Dam Reservoir in Chaharmahal and Bakhtiari, Iran. The deck is located 245 metres (804 ft) above the reservoir's bed and 70 metres (230 ft) above the N.W.L. Access to the bridge is possible by driving through a couple of tunnels with 550 metres (1,800 ft) and 450 metres (1,480 ft) length at two sides of bridge.
