= Mohammad Hassan Khan Bridge =

Historic bridge in Mazandaran, Iran

Mohammad Hassan Khan bridge پل محمدحسن‌خان
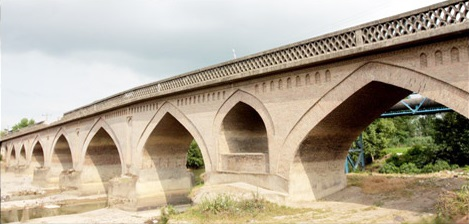
- Coordinates: 36.52442°N 52.6618°E

Characteristics
- Total length: 140 m (459 ft)
- Width: 6 m (20 ft)
- Height: 11 m (36 ft)

History
- Construction start: 1146 AH

Location
- Interactive map of Mohammad Hassan Khan bridge

Mohammad Hassan Khan Bridge (Persian: پل محمدحسن‌خان, romanized: Pol-e Mohammad Hasan Khan) lies on the Babol river in Nooshirvan Kola Road of Babol city, Mazandaran Province. The bridge was constructed by Mohammad Hassan Khan Qajar in 1146 AH (1733–34 AD) when the war between him and Karim Khan Zand had ended. Prior to its construction, during the Ghaznavid era, there was a wooden bridge in the same location.

This bridge has eight springs with a Safavid style arch shape. It is constructed with very decorative bricks. The bridge is about 140 m long, 6 m wide. It is composed of seven main bays and two secondary bays rising to the height of 11 m from the river bed.

Historically, the bridge has suffered from various earthquake and natural factors. In 1906, two piers of 9th span was flooded and broke which was repaired by a Barforush merchant. Two arches of bridges were destroyed in earthquake of 1820 which was repaired later.

== See also ==
- List of bridges in Iran
