= Al-badil =

Al-badil (البديل) means The Alternative in Arabic, and is used in various contexts:

- The Al-Badeel Coalition, which seeks to provide Arab society with an alternative to the traditional code of honour
- Al-Badeel (Palestine), a joint list of leftist parties at the Palestinian legislative election, 2006
- BADIL, Resource Center for Palestinian Residency and Refugee Rights
