= 2026 Karaj B1 bridge attack =

American military operation

Karaj B1 bridge attack
- Part of the 2026 Iran war
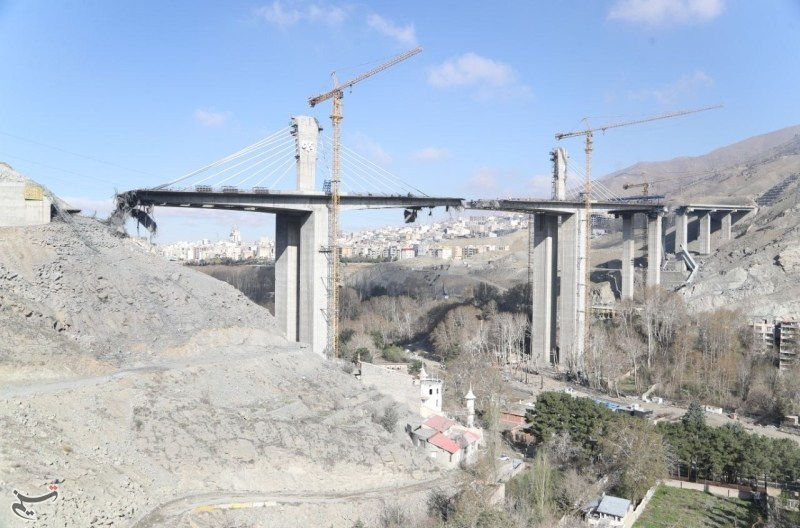
- The bridge after the attack
- Type: Double tap strike
- Location: Karaj, Alborz province, Iran
- Planned by: United States
- Target: Karaj B1 bridge
- Date: 2 April 2026
- Executed by: United States Air Force
- Casualties: 8 civilians killed 95+ injured

Location in Iran

As part of the 2026 Iran war, the unfinished B1 bridge in Karaj, Iran, was attacked on 2 April 2026 by the United States with two missiles, causing it to partially collapse. Eight people were killed and at least 95 were wounded. According to Iran's Fars News Agency, the second strike occurred once first responders had arrived to assist victims of the first strike. The deputy governor of Alborz province said the victims were civilians celebrating Sizdah Be-dar in the area below the bridge. The attack came amid United States president Donald Trump's threats to destroy Iranian civilian infrastructure.

== Attack ==
On 2 April, the United States military struck the unfinished B1 bridge, eliminating what it called a planned military supply route for Iranian missiles and drones. The strikes came after Trump's speech earlier in the day vowing to escalate the strikes on Iran over the next two to three weeks to "bring them back to the Stone Ages, where they belong." Alborz province governor Ghodratollah Seif said the strikes killed eight people and wounded 95, most of whom were residents from a nearby village celebrating Sizdah be-dar, the last day of Nowruz. According to the Iran's Fars News Agency, the second strike occurred after first responders arrived to help people wounded in the strike, killing two and injuring several more. Seif said that "there was absolutely no military activity on bridge B1."

== Reactions ==
United States President Donald Trump hailed the strike on the bridge, posting a video of the explosion on Truth Social and warning that there was "much more to follow," threatening Iran to "make a deal before it is too late, and there is nothing left of what still could become a great country." He also threatened to target "Bridges next, then Electric Power Plants."

Iranian Foreign Minister Abbas Araghchi condemned the attack on the bridge as an illegal breach of international law, noting that "striking civilian structures, including unfinished bridges, will not compel Iranians to surrender", and that the attack "only conveys the defeat and moral collapse of an enemy in disarray". Iranian Ambassador to the United Nations Amir-Saeid Iravani said that the attack on the civilian site constitutes "a war crime" and "a clear act of state terrorism."

== Legality ==
According to Brian Finucane, a former State Department lawyer, the legality of the attack on the bridge "would depend on the facts," noting that the "bridge was targeted not to provide any military advantage but in the hopes of coercing Tehran and generating [media] content."

Experts assessed that the strikes on the bridge, along with other attacks on civilian infrastructure, may constitute war crimes. They cited the Geneva Conventions prohibiting the destruction of "objects indispensable to the survival of the civilian population," as well as the International Criminal Court's indictment of four Russian military officials in 2024 for systematically targeting Ukraine's power grid.
