= Karaj B1 bridge =

Bridge under construction in Karaj, Iran

B1 Bridge (Bilqan) پل B1 (بیلقان)
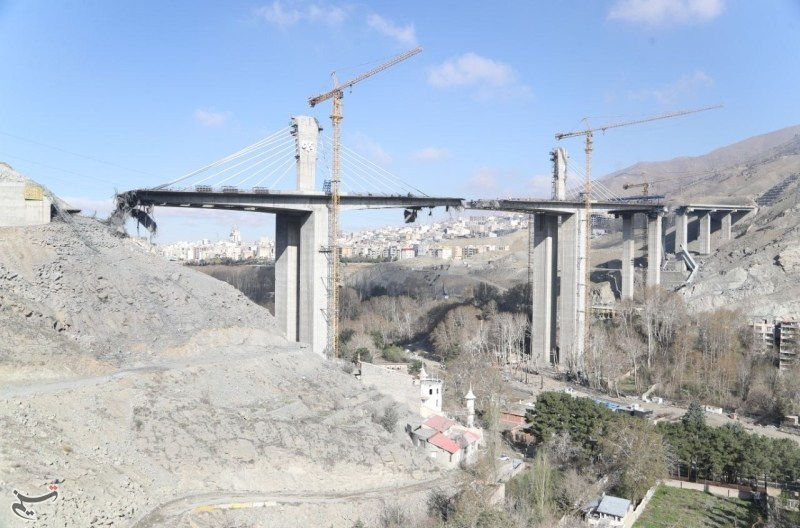
- The bridge after the April 2026 attack
- Coordinates: 35.828684°N 51.036742°E
- Carries: Road traffic
- Crosses: Karaj River
- Locale: Karaj, Alborz Province, Iran

Characteristics
- Height: 136–138 m (approx.)

History
- Construction start: 2016

Location
- Interactive map of B1 Bridge (Bilqan)

B1 Bridge (Bilqan) (Persian: پل B1 (بیلقان)) is a cable-stayed bridge in Karaj, Alborz province, Iran. It is part of the Northern Karaj Freeway (Karaj Northern Bypass) project and spans the Karaj River near the entrance to Chalous Road.

Bilqan is located about 4 kilometres from the city of Karaj, near the Azimiyeh district and at the beginning of Chalous Road. The B1 Bridge is one of several major structures along the Northern Karaj Freeway, which is intended to reduce congestion in the Karaj–Tehran corridor and improve connectivity between central, western, and northern regions of Iran.

The bridge sustained significant damage in an attack by the United States in the 2026 Iran war. The attack killed eight people and wounded 95 others, and caused the bridge to partially collapse.

== Design and characteristics ==
The B1 Bridge has an estimated height of approximately 136–138 metres. Due to its structural complexity and scale, it has been described by project officials as a technically significant engineering project. The bridge is described by authorities as the highest bridge in the Middle East.

The Northern Karaj Freeway has been described as a strategic infrastructure project, with estimates suggesting that it could reduce approximately 30 percent of traffic in Tehran and Karaj, equivalent to about 60,000 vehicles, and divert transit traffic away from the urban core.

== Construction ==
Construction of the Shahid Soleimani Freeway began in July 2016 but was halted for several years. In 2023, construction resumed, and the first section of the freeway was inaugurated in December 2023. Approximately 130 workers were reported to be engaged daily in the construction of the Bilqan Bridge (B1), which has a length of about 1,050 metres and a height of approximately 136 metres above ground level.

The bridge was assembled using prefabricated concrete segments. The broader Northern Karaj Bypass project includes 21 bridges and 63 drainage structures, with a total length of approximately 18 kilometres. The route begins at the western end of the Hemmat–Karaj Freeway, passes north of Karaj through the Alborz mountain range, and connects to the Karaj–Qazvin Freeway near Kamalshahr.

The bridge is constructed using high-strength concrete with a compressive strength of approximately 540 kg/cm². According to reports, optimization of the concrete mix enabled the structure to achieve about 70 percent of its required strength within three days, facilitating faster installation of prestressing cables within the bridge deck.

== 2026 attack ==
The bridge sustained severe damage on 2 April 2026 during two rounds of American airstrikes. The attack killed eight people and wounded 95 others. According to Iran's Fars News Agency, the second strike (double tapped) occurred once first responders had arrived to assist victims of the first strike. The deputy governor of Alborz province said the victims were civilians celebrating Sizdah Be-dar in the area below the bridge. The attack came amid President of the United States Donald Trump's threats to destroy Iranian civilian infrastructure amid the ongoing 2026 Iran war.

Experts assessed that the strikes on the bridge, along with other attacks on civilian infrastructure, may constitute war crimes. Experts cited the Geneva Conventions prohibiting the destruction of "objects indispensable to the survival of the civilian population," as well as the International Criminal Court's indictment of four Russian military officials in 2024 for systematically targeting Ukraine's power grid.

== See also ==
- Transport in Iran
- List of bridges in Iran
