= Ab Bid-e Kusha =

Ab Bid-e Kusha ابيدكوشا
- Village
- Location within Iran
- Coordinates: 28°08′31″N 56°57′12″E
- Country: Iran
- Province: Hormozgan
- County: Hajjiabad
- Bakhsh: Ahmadi
- Rural District: Kuh Shah

Population (2006)
  - Total: 234
- Time zone: UTC+3:30 (IRST)
  - Summer (DST): UTC+4:30 (IRDT)

Ab Bid-e Kusha (Persian: ابيدكوشا, also Romanized as Āb Bīd-e Kūshā; also known as Ābbīd) is a village in Kuh Shah Rural District, Ahmadi District, Hajjiabad County, Hormozgan Province, Iran. At the 2006 census, its population was 234, in 56 families.
