= Seyidan =

- Municipality
- Location within Azerbaijan
- Coordinates: 39°44′26″N 48°57′23″E
- Country: Azerbaijan
- Rayon: Salyan

Population
  - Total: 878
- Time zone: UTC+4 (AZT)
  - Summer (DST): UTC+5 (AZT)

Seyidan (also, Seydan) is a village and municipality in the Salyan Rayon of Azerbaijan. It has a population of 878.
