= Ab Bid, Dezful =

Ab Bid اب بيد
- Village
- Location in Iran
- Coordinates: 32.4936733624419°N 48.875008905790445°E
- Country: Iran
- Province: Khuzestan
- County: Dezful
- Bakhsh: Sardasht
- Rural District: Emamzadeh Seyyed Mahmud

Population (2006)
  - Total: 35
- Time zone: UTC+3:30 (IRST)
  - Summer (DST): UTC+4:30 (IRDT)

Ab Bid (Persian: اب بيد, also Romanized as Āb Bīd) is a village in Emamzadeh Seyyed Mahmud Rural District, Sardasht District, Dezful County, Khuzestan Province, Iran. At the 2006 census, its population was 35, in 5 families.
