= Ab Bid Kardakaneh =

Ab Bid Kardakaneh اب بيدكرداكانه
- Village
- Location within Iran
- Coordinates: 33°20′07″N 48°13′07″E
- Country: Iran
- Province: Lorestan
- County: Pol-e Dokhtar
- Bakhsh: Central
- Rural District: Miyankuh-e Gharbi

Population (2006)
  - Total: 34
- Time zone: UTC+3:30 (IRST)
  - Summer (DST): UTC+4:30 (IRDT)

Ab Bid Kardakaneh (Persian: اب بيدكرداكانه, also Romanized as Āb Bīd Kardāḵāneh; also known as Āb Bīd) is a village in Miyankuh-e Gharbi Rural District, in the Central District of Pol-e Dokhtar County, Lorestan Province, Iran. At the 2006 census, its population was 34, in 7 families.
