= Piran, Azerbaijan =

Human settlement in Azerbaijan

Coordinates: 38°44′N 48°39′E

Piran (known as İyirminci until 1991) is a village and municipality in the Lerik Rayon of Azerbaijan. It has a population of 885.
