= Ab Bid, Qilab =

Ab Bid آب‌بید
- Village
- Location within Iran
- Coordinates: 32°46′37″N 48°23′50″E
- Country: Iran
- Province: Khuzestan
- County: Andimeshk
- Bakhsh: Alvar-e Garmsiri
- Rural District: Qilab

Population (2006)
  - Total: 64
- Time zone: UTC+3:30 (IRST)
  - Summer (DST): UTC+4:30 (IRDT)

Ab Bid (Persian: آب‌بید, also Romanized as Āb Bīd; also known as ‘Ābīd) is a village in Qilab Rural District, Alvar-e Garmsiri District, Andimeshk County, Khuzestan Province, Iran. At the 2006 census, its population was 64, in 15 families.
