= Ab Bid-e Deli Rich-e Olya =

Ab Bid-e Deli Rich-e Olya اب بيد دلي ريچ عليا
- Village
- Location within Iran
- Coordinates: 30°59′37″N 51°00′06″E
- Country: Iran
- Province: Kohgiluyeh and Boyer-Ahmad
- County: Boyer-Ahmad
- Bakhsh: Margown
- Rural District: Margown

Population (2006)
  - Total: 96
- Time zone: UTC+3:30 (IRST)
  - Summer (DST): UTC+4:30 (IRDT)

Ab Bid-e Deli Rich-e Olya (Persian: اب بيد دلي ريچ عليا, also Romanized as Āb Bīd-e Delī Rīch-e ‘Olyā; also known as Āb Bīd) is a village in Margown Rural District, Margown District, Boyer-Ahmad County, Kohgiluyeh and Boyer-Ahmad Province, Iran. At the 2006 census, its population was 96, in 19 families.
