= Ab Bid, Hati =

Ab Bid آب بید
- Village
- Location in Iran
- Country: Iran
- Province: Khuzestan
- County: Lali
- Bakhsh: Hati
- Rural District: Hati

Population (2006)
  - Total: 32
- Time zone: UTC+3:30 (IRST)
  - Summer (DST): UTC+4:30 (IRDT)

Ab Bid (Persian: آب بید, also Romanized as Āb Bīd) is a village in Hati Rural District, Hati District, Lali County, Khuzestan province, Iran. At the 2006 census, its population was 32, in 4 families.
