= Ab Bid Sari-ye Do =

Ab Bid Sari-ye Do اب بيدسري 2
- Village
- Location within Iran
- Coordinates: 32°41′12″N 48°37′37″E
- Country: Iran
- Province: Khuzestan
- County: Dezful
- Bakhsh: Sardasht
- Rural District: Shahi

Population (2006)
  - Total: 182
- Time zone: UTC+3:30 (IRST)
  - Summer (DST): UTC+4:30 (IRDT)

Ab Bid Sari-ye Do (Persian: اب بيدسري 2, also Romanized as Āb Bīd Sarī-ye Do; also known as Abidsareh-ye Do) is a village in Shahi Rural District, Sardasht District, Dezful County, Khuzestan Province, Iran. At the 2006 census, its population was 182, in 34 families.
