= Ab Bid-e Sar Anjeli =

Ab Bid-e Sar Anjeli اب بيدسرانجلي
- Village
- Location within Iran
- Coordinates: 30°29′11″N 52°01′06″E
- Country: Iran
- Province: Fars
- County: Sepidan
- Bakhsh: Central
- Rural District: Komehr

Population (2006)
  - Total: 86
- Time zone: UTC+3:30 (IRST)
  - Summer (DST): UTC+4:30 (IRDT)

Ab Bid-e Sar Anjeli (Persian: اب بيدسرانجلي, also Romanized as Āb Bīd-e Sar Ānjelī; also known as Cheshmeh Sarānjīlī, Sarānjīlī, and Sar Anjīlī) is a village in Komehr Rural District, in the Central District of Sepidan County, Fars province, Iran. At the 2006 census, its population was 86, in 20 families.
