= Cham Chit, Lorestan =

Cham Chit چم چيت
- Village
- Location within Iran
- Coordinates: 33°22′48″N 48°57′00″E
- Country: Iran
- Province: Lorestan
- County: Dorud
- Bakhsh: Central
- Rural District: Dorud

Population (2006)
  - Total: 39
- Time zone: UTC+3:30 (IRST)
  - Summer (DST): UTC+4:30 (IRDT)

Cham Chit (Persian: چم چيت, also Romanized as Cham Chīt; also known as Cham Chid) is a village in Dorud Rural District, in the Central District of Dorud County, Lorestan Province, Iran. At the 2006 census, its population was 39, in 8 families.
