= Ab Bid-e Heygun =

Ab Bid-e Heygun اب بيدهيگون
- Village
- Location within Iran
- Coordinates: 30°27′27″N 50°35′46″E
- Country: Iran
- Province: Kohgiluyeh and Boyer-Ahmad
- County: Kohgiluyeh
- Bakhsh: Central
- Rural District: Dehdasht-e Sharqi

Population (2006)
  - Total: 68
- Time zone: UTC+3:30 (IRST)
  - Summer (DST): UTC+4:30 (IRDT)

Ab Bid-e Heygun (Persian: اب بيدهيگون, also romanized as Āb Bīd-e Heygūn; also known as Āb Bīd) is a village in Dehdasht-e Sharqi Rural District, in the Central District of Kohgiluyeh County, Kohgiluyeh and Boyer-Ahmad Province, Iran. According to the 2006 census, it had a population of 68 in 14 families.
