= Ab Bid-e Dalun =

Ab Bid-e Dalun اب بيددالون
- Village
- Location within Iran
- Coordinates: 30°06′54″N 51°37′10″E
- Country: Iran
- Province: Fars
- County: Mamasani
- Bakhsh: Central
- Rural District: Bakesh-e Yek

Population (2006)
  - Total: 81
- Time zone: UTC+3:30 (IRST)
  - Summer (DST): UTC+4:30 (IRDT)

Ab Bid-e Dalun (Persian: اب بيددالون, also Romanized as Āb Bīd-e Dālūn; also known as Āb Bīd) is a village in Bakesh-e Yek Rural District, in the Central District of Mamasani County, Fars province, Iran. At the 2006 census, its population was 81, in 18 families.
