= Ab Bid, Kohgiluyeh and Boyer-Ahmad =

Ab Bid اب بيد
- Village
- Location within Iran
- Coordinates: 30°53′42″N 50°20′20″E
- Country: Iran
- Province: Kohgiluyeh and Boyer-Ahmad
- County: Kohgiluyeh
- Bakhsh: Central
- Rural District: Tayebi-ye Garmsiri-ye Jonubi

Population (2006)
  - Total: 73
- Time zone: UTC+3:30 (IRST)
  - Summer (DST): UTC+4:30 (IRDT)

Ab Bid (Persian: اب بيد, also Romanized as Āb Bīd) is a village in Tayebi-ye Garmsiri-ye Jonubi Rural District, in the Central District of Kohgiluyeh County, Kohgiluyeh and Boyer-Ahmad Province, Iran. According to the 2006 census, it had a population of 73 in 16 families.
