= Piran, Chaharmahal and Bakhtiari =

Piran پيران
- Village
- Location within Iran
- Coordinates: 31°30′48″N 50°47′58″E
- Country: Iran
- Province: Chaharmahal and Bakhtiari
- County: Lordegan
- Bakhsh: Central
- Rural District: Milas

Population (2006)
  - Total: 325
- Time zone: UTC+3:30 (IRST)
  - Summer (DST): UTC+4:30 (IRDT)

Piran (Persian: پيران, also Romanized as Pīrān) is a village in Milas Rural District, in the Central District of Lordegan County, Chaharmahal and Bakhtiari Province, Iran. At the 2006 census, its population was 325, in 51 families.
