= BADIL =

Non-profit organization focusing on Palestinian refugee issues

- Native name: مركز بديل
- Founded: 1998

BADIL Resource Center for Palestinian Residency and Refugee Rights is an independent, human rights non-profit organization committed to protect and promote the rights of Palestinian refugees and internally displaced persons. BADIL was established in January 1998.

BADIL has special consultative status with UN ECOSOC and is also part of a large number of Palestinian organisation networks.

BADIL's efforts were inspired by the work Professors Susan Akram, Guy Goodwin-Gill and John Quigley, as well as the work of Salman Abu-Sitta. It "pursued a solid campaign for publicizing refugee rights in various international fora" and was considered prominent among NGOs and research center working in this area in the post-Oslo period.

BADIL publishes al-Majdal, an English language quarterly magazine about Palestinian refugee issues.
