= Do Piran, Ramhormoz =

Do Piran دوپيران
- Village
- Location within Iran
- Coordinates: 31°10′29″N 49°34′54″E
- Country: Iran
- Province: Khuzestan
- County: Ramhormoz
- Bakhsh: Central
- Rural District: Howmeh-ye Sharqi

Population (2006)
  - Total: 282
- Time zone: UTC+3:30 (IRST)
  - Summer (DST): UTC+4:30 (IRDT)

Do Piran (Persian: دوپيران, also Romanized as Do Pīrān) is a village in Howmeh-ye Sharqi Rural District, in the Central District of Ramhormoz County, Khuzestan Province, Iran. At the 2006 census, its population was 282, in 55 families.
