= Ab Bid, Andika =

Ab Bid آب بید
- Village
- Location within Iran
- Coordinates: 32°10′05″N 49°33′30″E
- Country: Iran
- Province: Khuzestan
- County: Andika
- Bakhsh: Abezhdan
- Rural District: Kushk

Population (2006)
  - Total: 417
- Time zone: UTC+3:30 (IRST)
  - Summer (DST): UTC+4:30 (IRDT)

Ab Bid (Persian: آب بید, also Romanized as Āb Bīd) is a village in Kushk Rural District, Abezhdan District, Andika County, Khuzestan Province, Iran. At the 2006 census, its population was 417, in 67 families.
