= Ab Bid, Behbahan =

Ab Bid اب بيد
- Village
- Location within Iran
- Coordinates: 30°49′27″N 50°03′15″E
- Country: Iran
- Province: Khuzestan
- County: Behbahan
- Bakhsh: Tashan
- Rural District: Tashan-e Gharbi

Population (2006)
  - Total: 43
- Time zone: UTC+3:30 (IRST)
  - Summer (DST): UTC+4:30 (IRDT)

Ab Bid (Persian: اب بيد, also Romanized as Āb Bīd) is a village in Tashan-e Gharbi Rural District, Tashan District, Behbahan County, Khuzestan Province, Iran. In 2006, its population was 43, in 7 families.
