= Ab Bid, Masjed Soleyman =

Ab Bid آب بید
- Village
- Location within Iran
- Coordinates: 31°50′04″N 49°27′37″E
- Country: Iran
- Province: Khuzestan
- County: Masjed Soleyman
- Bakhsh: Golgir
- Rural District: Tombi Golgir

Population (2006)
  - Total: 15
- Time zone: UTC+3:30 (IRST)
  - Summer (DST): UTC+4:30 (IRDT)

Ab Bid (Persian: آب بید, also Romanized as Āb Bīd; also known as Āb Bīdī) is a village in Tombi Golgir Rural District, Golgir District, Masjed Soleyman County, Khuzestan Province, Iran. At the 2006 census, its population was 15, in 4 families.
