= Farajabad, Kurdistan =

Village in Kurdistan, Iran

Farajabad فرج آباد
- Village
- Location within Iran
- Coordinates: 35°00′00″N 46°46′50″E
- Country: Iran
- Province: Kurdistan
- County: Kamyaran
- Bakhsh: Muchesh
- Rural District: Gavrud

Population (2006)
  - Total: 447
- Time zone: UTC+3:30 (IRST)
  - Summer (DST): UTC+4:30 (IRDT)

Farajabad (Persian: فرج آباد, also Romanized as Farajābād) is a village in Gavrud Rural District, Muchesh District, Kamyaran County, Kurdistan Province, Iran. At the 2006 census, its population was 447, in 101 families. The village is populated by Kurds.
