= Ab Bid-e Mazeh Koreh =

Ab Bid-e Mazeh Koreh اب بيدمازه كره
- Village
- Country: Iran
- Province: Kohgiluyeh and Boyer-Ahmad
- County: Charam
- Bakhsh: Sarfaryab
- Rural District: Sarfaryab

Population (2006)
  - Total: 29
- Time zone: UTC+3:30 (IRST)
  - Summer (DST): UTC+4:30 (IRDT)

Ab Bid-e Mazeh Koreh (Persian: اب بيدمازه كره, also Romanized as Āb Bīd-e Māzeh Koreh) is a village in Sarfaryab Rural District, Sarfaryab District, Charam County, Kohgiluyeh and Boyer-Ahmad Province, Iran. At the 2006 census, its population was 29, in 5 families.
