= Ab Bid-e Doshman Ziari =

Ab Bid-e Doshman Ziari اببيددشمن زياري
- Village
- Location within Iran
- Coordinates: 30°00′47″N 51°49′11″E
- Country: Iran
- Province: Fars
- County: Mamasani
- Bakhsh: Doshman Ziari
- Rural District: Doshman Ziari

Population (2006)
  - Total: 338
- Time zone: UTC+3:30 (IRST)
  - Summer (DST): UTC+4:30 (IRDT)

Ab Bid-e Doshman Ziari (Persian: اببيددشمن زياري, also Romanized as Āb Bīd-e Doshman Zīārī; also known as Āb Bīd and Darreh Āb Bīd) is a village in Doshman Ziari Rural District, Doshman Ziari District, Mamasani County, Fars province, Iran. At the 2006 census, its population was 338, in 89 families.
