= Ab Bid, Fars =

Ab Bid اب بيد
- Village
- Location within Iran
- Coordinates: 30°10′05″N 51°44′04″E
- Country: Iran
- Province: Fars
- County: Mamasani
- Bakhsh: Central
- Rural District: Javid-e Mahuri

Population (2006)
  - Total: 45
- Time zone: UTC+3:30 (IRST)
  - Summer (DST): UTC+4:30 (IRDT)

Ab Bid (Persian: اب بيد, also Romanized as Āb Bīd; also known as Āb Bīd-e Lalah) is a village in Javid-e Mahuri Rural District, in the Central District of Mamasani County, Fars province, Iran. At the 2006 census, its population was 45, in 11 families.
