= Ab Bid-e Galleh Tavak =

Ab Bid-e Galleh Tavak اب بيدگله توك
- Village
- Location within Iran
- Coordinates: 32°17′07″N 49°26′43″E
- Country: Iran
- Province: Khuzestan
- County: Andika
- Bakhsh: Central
- Rural District: Qaleh-ye Khvajeh

Population (2006)
  - Total: 279
- Time zone: UTC+3:30 (IRST)
  - Summer (DST): UTC+4:30 (IRDT)

Ab Bid-e Galleh Tavak (Persian: اب بيدگله توك, also Romanized as Āb Bīd-e Galleh Tavak; also known as ‘Ābīd) is a village in Qaleh-ye Khvajeh Rural District, in the Central District of Andika County, Khuzestan Province, Iran. At the 2006 census, its population was 279, in 48 families.
