= Upper Gotvand Dam =

Dam in Khuzestan, Iran

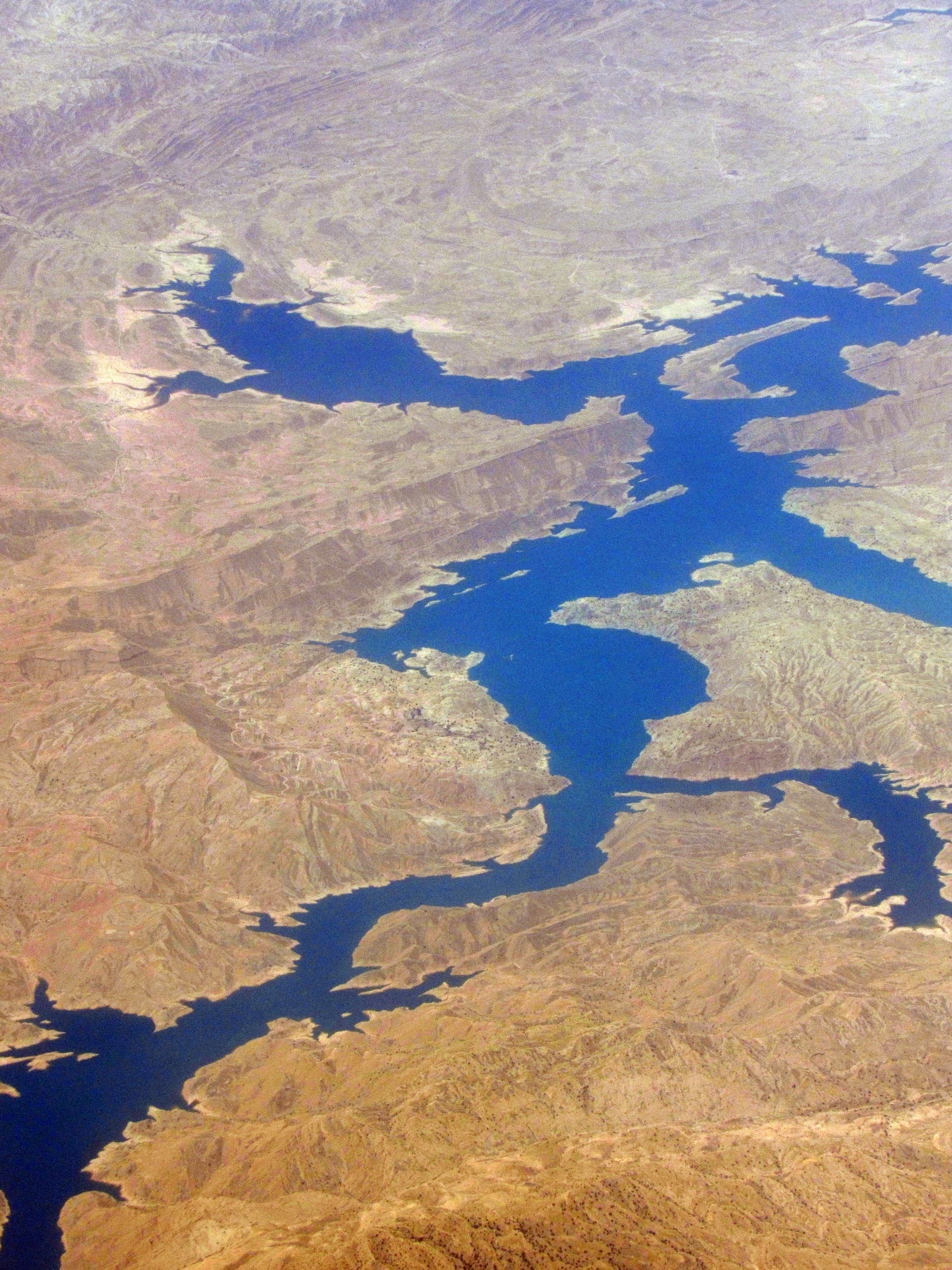
- Upper Gotvand Reservoir
- Interactive map of Upper Gotvand Dam
- Country: Iran
- Location: Gotvand, Gotvand County, Khuzestan Province
- Status: Operational
- Construction began: August 2004
- Opening date: 2012
- Owners: Iran Water & Power Resources Development Co.

Dam and spillways
- Type of dam: Earthfill dam
- Impounds: Karun River
- Height (foundation): 180 m (591 ft)
- Length: 760 m (2,493 ft)
- Width (crest): 15 m (49 ft)
- Width (base): 1,075 m (3,527 ft)
- Dam volume: 28,500,000 m^{3} (1.006468002×10^{9} ft^{3})
- Spillways: 4
- Spillway type: Service, controlled ogee-type
- Spillway capacity: 17,500 m^{3}/s (618,007 cu ft/s)

Reservoir
- Creates: Upper Gotvand Reservoir
- Total capacity: 4,500,000,000 m^{3} (3,648,209 acre⋅ft)
- Catchment area: 32,425 km^{2} (12,519 sq mi)
- Surface area: 96.5 km^{2} (37 sq mi)

Power Station
- Commission date: 2012
- Type: Conventional
- Turbines: 4 x 250 MW Francis-type
- Installed capacity: 1,000 MW (currently); 2,000 MW (with phase 2)
- Annual generation: 4,500 GWh

Upper Gotvand Dam, or simply the Gotvand Dam (Persian: سد گتوند بالا), is an embankment dam on the Karun River about 12 km (7.5 mi) northeast of Gotvand in Khuzestan Province, Iran. It currently has an installed capacity of 1,000 MW with another 1,000 MW in the works for a second phase. Studies for the project on Karun River began in the 1960s and specific designs on the Upper Gotvand were presented in 1967, 1975 and 1982. After the design and location were chosen, a further study was carried out in 1997. Preliminary construction (roads, bridges, river diversion) began the same year. Besides the hydroelectric power production, the dam was also aimed at flood control. The river was diverted by April 2003 and excavation began soon thereafter. After completion of the dam, impounding of its reservoir began on 30 July 2011 during a ceremony attended by Iranian President Mahmood Ahmadinejad. The first generator of phase one was commissioned on 5 May 2012, two more by 18 September 2012 and the final in November 2012. Ahmadinejad was again present for the dam's inauguration on 22 April 2013. Phase 2 is estimated to be complete in 2015 and the dam is going to become one of Iran's largest power stations and is already its tallest earth-fill dam.

Downstream of the Upper Gotvand Dam is the 22 m (72 ft) high Lower Gotvand Dam at 32°16′32.51″N 48°50′8.52″E. Constructed from 1975 to 1977, it serves to divert portions of the river into two canals for the irrigation of 42,000 ha (100,000 acres) of farmland.

== Objectives of dam construction ==
The goals of building this dam are:

- Hydroelectric energy production of 4500 gigawatt hours per year.
- Control of seasonal and destructive Karun river floods.
- Regulation of downstream agricultural water.
- Tourist attractions.

== Challenges ==
Before the water extraction of this dam, one of the important debates and disagreements surrounding the construction of this dam was that in the downstream part of this dam, the ground has salt veins and this can cause the saltiness of the water used by the cities and villages downstream. Engineer Meshkat, a geologist and a member of the team that prepared the geological map of the dam, said that the design team was aware of the problem of the dam lake being located on salt masses. Also, Isa Kalantari, the former head of the Environmental Protection Organization, said: Before the revolution, the Americans examined the Gotvand dam from an environmental point of view and decided to build the dam 15 kilometers higher. He believes that the executors of the Gotvand dam project should be tried for the error in the implementation of this project. He said to the students of Tehran University Geography Faculty and environmental activists: "The salinity of the water below the dam is 5.5 times the salinity of the water in the Persian Gulf, and nothing can be done to solve this problem."

=== The effect of the Gotvand Dam on the salinity of the Karun River ===
Since before and after the water intake of Gotvand Dam, there have been criticisms about the salinization of the water of the Karun River by the lake of this dam due to its location on the Gachsaran formation and its proximity to the salt mountains. These criticisms had caused widespread concerns, and as a result, the dam's water intake had been postponed several times.

=== Theories about dam environmental issues ===
- Mehdi Qomshi, professor of water engineering at Chamran University of Ahvaz, says that the Gotvand dam will act like a time bomb.
- In the report related to the water institute of Tehran University, two national mistakes are pointed out: "Determining the axis of the dam without conducting water quality studies" and "Taking water from the dam despite the official opposition of the Environmental Organization and the letter of the National Inspection Organization".

== See also ==
- List of power stations in Iran
- Dams in Iran
