= Guy Goodwin-Gill =

British barrister

Guy Serle Goodwin-Gill
- Born: 25 December 1946 (age 79)
- Occupations: barrister, professor

Guy Serle Goodwin-Gill (born 25 December 1946) is a barrister and a professor of public international law at Oxford University and a Fellow of All Souls College, Oxford.

His research areas include international organisations, human rights, migrants and refugees, elections and democratisation and children's rights; he teaches Human Rights and International Law. He currently serves as the acting director of the Andrew and Renata Kaldor Centre for International Refugee Law at the University of New South Wales.

== The Palestine Question ==
Goodwin-Gill became noted for his contributions to the debate around international law and the Palestine question. He served as part of the advisory team which presented the Palestinian point of view with regards to the Israeli "Separation Wall" or "Separation Fence" on the Palestinian West Bank, which culminated in a 2004 ruling by the UN-affiliated International Court of Justice that the barrier was illegal. He later used his work on this case as part of a BDS-led push to have Israel's bid for membership to the OECD rejected, but Israel membership was granted in 2010.

In 2011, Goodwin-Gill wrote a legal opinion which recommended that the Palestinian National Authority not seek recognition of Palestine as a member state of the United Nations on the grounds that such a move would deprive the considerable Palestinian diaspora of legal representation within the putative state. In 2025, Goodwin-Gil proposed that any Israeli of military age, on entry into a foreign country, be asked where they were and what they did during the war in Gaza. The answers provided are to be cross-checked with independent sources of information. If credible evidence that the individual has engaged in war crimes is uncovered, the government is to take appropriate action, according to their own domestic laws, to prosecute that individual for war crimes (https://opiniojuris.org/2025/09/02/we-need-to-talk-about-genocide/).

== Lectures ==
- Migrants' Rights in the Lecture Series of the United Nations Audiovisual Library of International Law
- International Migration Law - A General Introduction in the Lecture Series of the United Nations Audiovisual Library of International Law
- Forced Migration - The Evolution of International Refugee Law and Organization in the Lecture Series of the United Nations Audiovisual Library of International Law
- Expulsion in Public International Law in the Lecture Series of the United Nations Audiovisual Library of International Law
