= Ab Bid, Izeh =

Ab Bid آبید
- Village
- Location within Iran
- Coordinates: 32°04′41″N 49°56′28″E
- Country: Iran
- Province: Khuzestan
- County: Izeh
- Bakhsh: Susan
- Rural District: Susan-e Sharqi

Population (2006)
  - Total: 285
- Time zone: UTC+3:30 (IRST)
  - Summer (DST): UTC+4:30 (IRDT)

Ab Bid (Persian: آبید, also Romanized as Āb Bīd) is a village in Susan-e Sharqi Rural District, Susan District, Izeh County, Khuzestan Province, Iran. At the 2006 census, its population was 285, in 45 families.
