= Ab Bid, Lorestan =

Ab Bid آب بيد
- Village
- Location within Iran
- Coordinates: 33°25′49″N 48°59′36″E
- Country: Iran
- Province: Lorestan
- County: Dorud
- Bakhsh: Central
- Rural District: Dorud

Population (2006)
  - Total: 26
- Time zone: UTC+3:30 (IRST)
  - Summer (DST): UTC+4:30 (IRDT)

Ab Bid (Persian: آب بيد, also Romanized as Āb Bīd, ‘Ābed, and Ābīd) is a village in Dorud Rural District, in the Central District of Dorud County, Lorestan Province, Iran. At the 2006 census, its population was 26, in 5 families.
