= Meshginshahr suspension bridge =

Meshginshahr suspension bridge پل معلق مشکین‌شهر
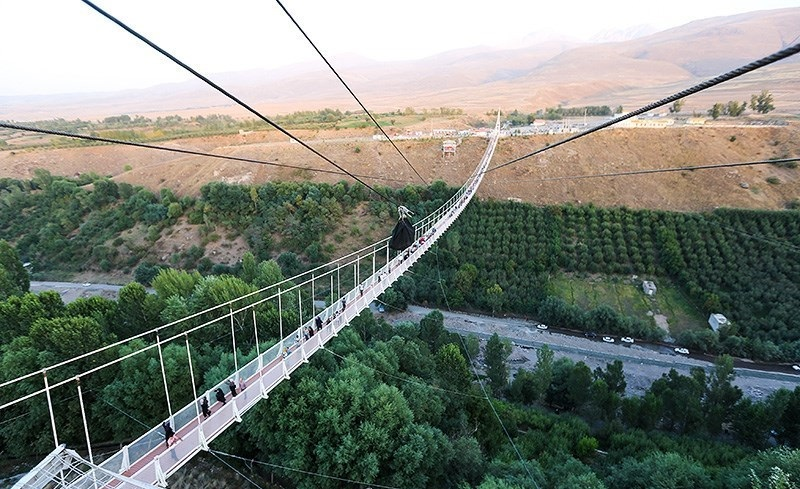
- Coordinates: 38.376363°N 47.682715°E
- Crosses: Khiav River
- Locale: Meshginshahr, Iran

Characteristics
- Design: Suspension Bridge
- Total length: 365 m (1,198 ft)
- Width: 2 m (7 ft)
- Height: 80 m (262 ft)

History
- Construction end: 2015
- Inaugurated: May 16, 2015

Meshginshahr suspension bridge crosses the Khiav River, near Meshginshahr, Ardabil Province in the northwest Iran. The original bridge was built in 2015.
