= Davazdah Cheshmeh =

Historic bridge in Amol, Iran

Davazdah Cheshmeh پل دوازده چشمه
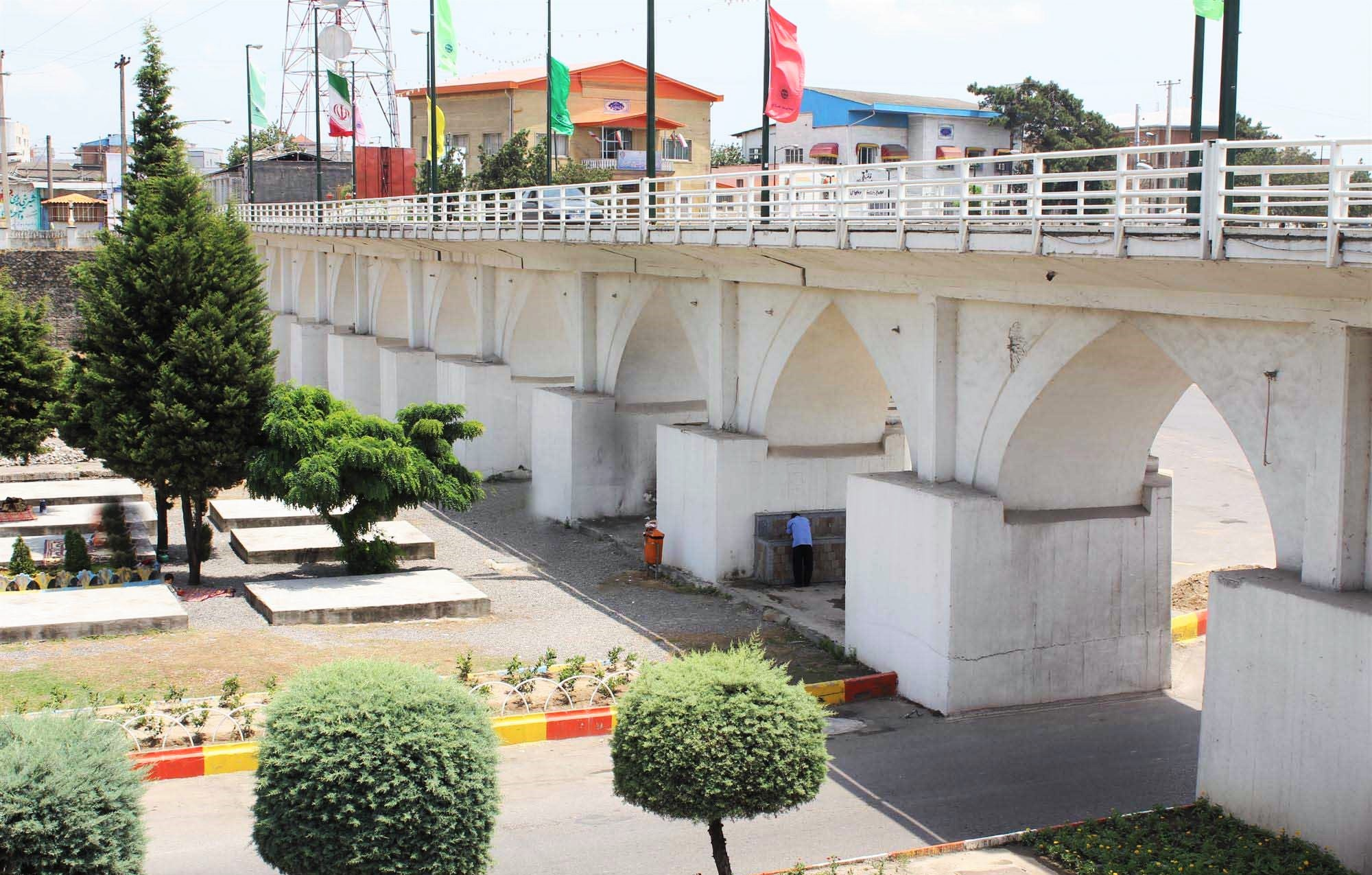
- Coordinates: 36°28′17″N 52°21′21″E
- Crosses: Haraz River
- Locale: Amol, Iran
- Official name: Davazdah Cheshmeh
- Maintained by: ICHTO
- Heritage status: Iran National Heritage List

Characteristics
- Material: Stone

Location
- Interactive map of Davazdah Cheshmeh

Davazdah Cheshmeh, also called the Davazdah Pelleh (old name Haraz Bridge), is a bridge in Amol, Iran. The bridge is a monument in Mazandaran. The Bridge is located in the center of the city, near Moalagh Bridge and connects the east of the city to the western sector and the longest bridge on Haraz River with the total length of 127.40 metres (418.0 ft).

The same was constructed in the 18th century. Mohammad Hassan Khan Etemad al-Saltanah says about the history of Davazdah Cheshmeh, that though the bridge was there before the Safavid era, it was completed during the reign of Abbas the Great. The Sasanian Empire built on a grand scale. The artists and materials they used were brought from all territories. was laid out with an extensive park with bridges, gardens, colonnaded palaces and open column pavilions.

== Notes ==
- General Specifications of Mazandaran Province – Ministry of Industry
- Persia and the Persian Question – Page 381
