= Seyyedan, Kurdistan =

Village in Kurdistan province, Iran

Seyyedan Persian: سيدان
- Village
- Location within Iran Location within Iran Kurdistan
- Coordinates: 35°55′54″N 47°43′27″E
- Country: Iran
- Province: Kurdistan
- County: Bijar
- District: Central
- Rural District: Khvor Khvoreh

Population (2016)
  - Total: 741
- Time zone: UTC+3:30 (IRST)

Seyyedan (Persian: سيدان) (Note: Also romanized as Seydān and Seyyedān; also known as Saīyīdeh) is a village in Khvor Khvoreh Rural District of the Central District in Bijar County, Kurdistan province, Iran.

== Demographics ==
=== Ethnicity ===
The village is populated by Kurds.

=== Population ===
At the time of the 2006 National Census, the village's population was 893 in 220 households. The following census in 2011 counted 842 people in 243 households. The 2016 census measured the population of the village as 741 people in 237 households, the most populous in its rural district.
