= Abid, Dezful =

Abid ابيد
- Village
- Location within Iran
- Coordinates: 32°29′40″N 48°52′34″E
- Country: Iran
- Province: Khuzestan
- County: Dezful
- Bakhsh: Sardasht
- Rural District: Sardasht

Population (2006)
  - Total: 662
- Time zone: UTC+3:30 (IRST)
  - Summer (DST): UTC+4:30 (IRDT)

Abid (Persian: ابيد, also Romanized as ‘Abīd; also known as Āb Bīd, Abed, and Shahrak-e Āb Bīd) is a village in Sardasht Rural District, Sardasht District, Dezful County, Khuzestan Province, Iran. At the 2006 census, its population was 662, in 120 families.
