= Karun-4 Dam =

Dam in Iran

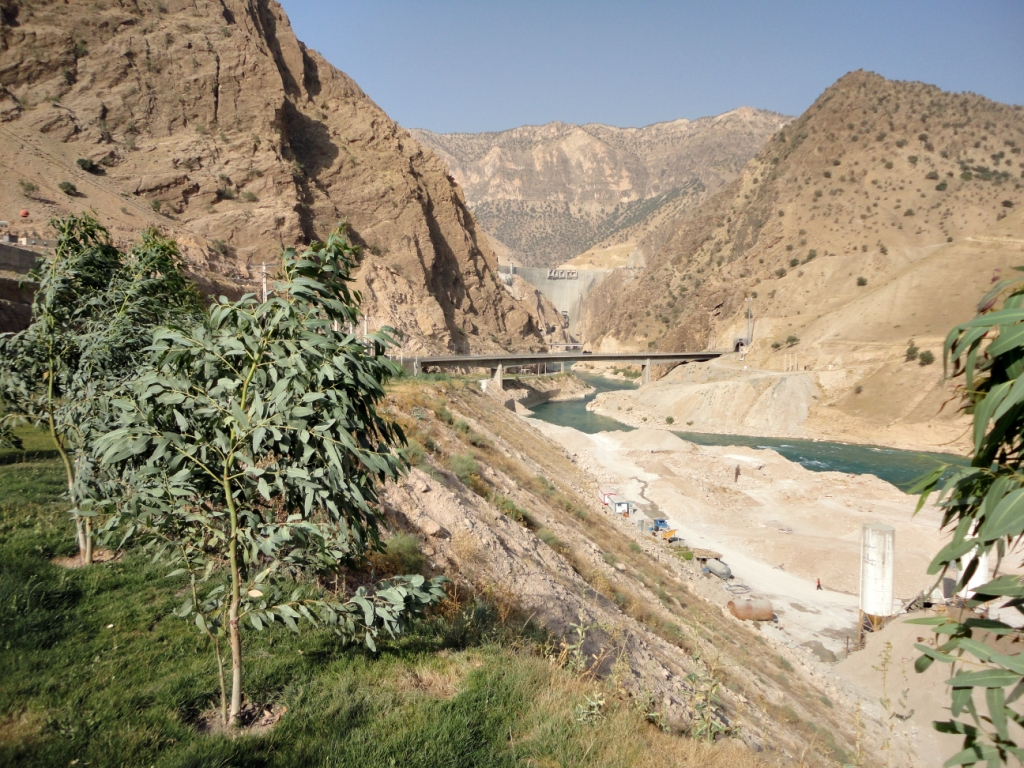
- The dam under construction
- Interactive map of Karun-4 Dam
- Location: Chahārmahāl-o-Bakhtiyārī; Iran
- Status: Operational
- Construction began: 1997
- Opening date: 2010
- Construction cost: 1.2 billion dollars
- Operator: IWPRDC

Dam and spillways
- Type of dam: Arch dam
- Impounds: Karun River
- Height: 230 m (750 ft)
- Length: 440 m (1,440 ft)
- Spillway capacity: 6,150 m^{3}/s (217,000 cu ft/s)

Reservoir
- Creates: Reservoir
- Total capacity: 2,190,000,000 m^{3} (1,780,000 acre⋅ft)
- Catchment area: 12,813.4 km^{2} (4,947 sq mi)
- Surface area: 29 km^{2} (11 sq mi)

Power Station
- Commission date: 2010-2011
- Turbines: 4 x 255 MW Francis-type
- Installed capacity: 1,020 MW

The Karun-4 Dam (Persian: سد کارون ۴) is an arch dam on the Karun River located 180 km southwest of Shahr-e Kord in the province of Chaharmahal and Bakhtiari, Iran. The Karun has the highest discharge of all the Iranian rivers. Its construction is aimed at generating hydroelectric power supply of 2,107 million kWh annually and controlling floods in the upper Karun.

The dam is a concrete double curvature arch-type and 230 metres (750 ft) high from the foundation. The arch dam design is an ideal one for a dam built in a narrow, rocky gorge to hold back water in a reservoir. The dam is curved. Because of the arch shape, the force of the backed up water presses downward against the dam and has the effect of strengthening the dam foundation. The dam withholds a reservoir with a surface area of 29 square kilometres (11 sq mi) and capacity of 2.19 cubic kilometres (1,780,000 acre⋅ft). The dam's first study was conducted in 1995 and river diversion began in 1997. Concrete pouring began in 2006 and the power plant began producing electricity in November 2010. On 11 December 2010, the second generator for the dam became operational and was connected to the grid. The dam will eventually have an installed capacity of 1,020 MW. The dam was inaugurated on 6 July 2011 by Iranian President Mahmoud Ahmadinejad.

== Objectives ==
It was built to fulfill the followings:

- To produce an average annual hydropower energy as much as 2100 GW-h.
- To join the cascade dams on the Karun River, hence regulate the flow in order to supply the water required by the industry and agriculture downstream.
- To control the destructive floods of the Karun River.

== See also ==
- List of power stations in Iran
- List of dams and reservoirs in Iran
