= Gotvand =

City in Khuzestan province, Iran

Gotvand Persian: گتوند
- City
- Location within Iran
- Coordinates: 32°14′36″N 48°48′49″E
- Country: Iran
- Province: Khuzestan
- County: Gotvand
- District: Central

Population (2016)
  - Total: 24,216
- Time zone: UTC+3:30 (IRST)

Gotvand (Persian: گتوند) is a city in the Central District of Gotvand County, Khuzestan province, Iran, serving as capital of both the county and the district.

Gotvand shares the record for highest temperature recorded in Iran with 53 °C or 127.4 °F on 17 July 2014, tying the record set at Dehloran in July 2011. The Lower and Upper Gotvand Dams are northeast of the city on the Karun River.

== Demographics ==
=== Language ===
The people of Gotvand speak the Bakhtiari dialect of the Luri language.

=== Population ===
At the time of the 2006 National Census, the city's population was 21,428 in 4,422 households. The following census in 2011 counted 22,822 people in 5,465 households. The 2016 census measured the population of the city as 24,216 people in 6,549 households.
