= Morvari =

Morvari مرواري
- Village
- Location within Iran
- Coordinates: 31°43′52″N 50°22′57″E
- Country: Iran
- Province: Khuzestan
- County: Izeh
- Bakhsh: Dehdez
- Rural District: Dehdez

Population (2006)
  - Total: 32
- Time zone: UTC+3:30 (IRST)
  - Summer (DST): UTC+4:30 (IRDT)

Morvari (Persian: مرواري, also Romanized as Morvārī and Marvarī; also known as Mavarī, Mawari, Morvārīd, and Morvarīd) is a village in Dehdez Rural District, Dehdez District, Izeh County, Khuzestan Province, Iran. At the 2006 census, its population was 32, in 6 families.
