= Piran, Hirmand =

Piran پيران
- Village
- Location within Iran
- Coordinates: 31°12′59″N 61°44′59″E
- Country: Iran
- Province: Sistan and Baluchestan
- County: Hirmand
- Bakhsh: Qorqori
- Rural District: Qorqori

Population (2006)
  - Total: 573
- Time zone: UTC+3:30 (IRST)
  - Summer (DST): UTC+4:30 (IRDT)

Piran (Persian: پيران, also Romanized as Pīrān; also known as Deh-e Pīrān and Gholām‘alī-ye Pīrān) is a village in Qorqori Rural District, Qorqori District, Hirmand County, Sistan and Baluchestan Province, Iran. At the 2006 census, its population was 573, in 136 families.
