= Jannat Makan Rural District =

Rural district in Khuzestan province, Iran

Jannat Makan Rural District Persian: دهستان جنت مكان
- Rural District
- Location within Iran
- Coordinates: 32°11′42″N 48°43′51″E
- Country: Iran
- Province: Khuzestan
- County: Gotvand
- District: Central
- Capital: Jannat Makan

Population (2016)
  - Total: 4,757
- Time zone: UTC+3:30 (IRST)

Jannat Makan Rural District (Persian: دهستان جنت مكان) is in the Central District of Gotvand County, Khuzestan province, Iran. It is administered from the city of Jannat Makan.

== Demographics ==
=== Population ===
At the time of the 2006 National Census, the rural district's population was 16,029 in 2,999 households. There were 3,791 inhabitants in 810 households at the following census of 2011. The 2016 census measured the population of the rural district as 4,757 in 1,126 households. The most populous of its 26 villages was Shahrak-e Panjom, with 2,660 people.
