= Aghili-ye Shomali Rural District =

Rural district in Khuzestan province, Iran

Aghili-ye Shomali Rural District Persian: دهستان عقيلي شمالي
- Rural District
- Location within Iran
- Coordinates: 32°14′19″N 48°53′59″E
- Country: Iran
- Province: Khuzestan
- County: Gotvand
- District: Aghili
- Capital: Somaleh

Population (2016)
  - Total: 3,708
- Time zone: UTC+3:30 (IRST)

Aghili-ye Shomali Rural District (Persian: دهستان عقيلي شمالي) (Note: Formerly Aghili Rural District (دهستان عقيلي)) is in Aghili District of Gotvand County, Khuzestan province, Iran. It is administered from the city of Somaleh.

== Demographics ==
=== Population ===
At the time of the 2006 National Census, the rural district's population was 10,415 in 2,049 households. There were 4,036 inhabitants in 943 households at the following census of 2011. The 2016 census measured the population of the rural district as 3,708 in 953 households. The most populous of its nine villages was Badil, with 965 people.
