= Aghili-ye Jonubi Rural District =

Rural district in Khuzestan province, Iran

Aghili-ye Jonubi Rural District Persian: دهستان عقيلي جنوبي
- Rural District
- Location within Iran
- Coordinates: 32°08′36″N 48°55′47″E
- Country: Iran
- Province: Khuzestan
- County: Gotvand
- District: Aghili
- Capital: Dasht-e Bozorg

Population (2016)
  - Total: 7,673
- Time zone: UTC+3:30 (IRST)

Aghili-ye Jonubi Rural District (Persian: دهستان عقيلي جنوبي) is in Aghili District of Gotvand County, Khuzestan province, Iran. Its capital is the village of Dasht-e Bozorg.

== Demographics ==
=== Population ===
At the time of the 2006 National Census, the rural district's population was 7,690 in 1,513 households. There were 8,120 inhabitants in 1,824 households at the following census of 2011. The 2016 census measured the population of the rural district as 7,673 in 1,922 households. The most populous of its 15 villages was Zolmabad, with 1,879 people.
