= Kiyaras Rural District =

Rural district in Khuzestan province, Iran

Kiyaras Rural District Persian: دهستان كيارس
- Rural District
- Location within Iran
- Coordinates: 32°20′04″N 48°49′15″E
- Country: Iran
- Province: Khuzestan
- County: Gotvand
- District: Central
- Capital: Pol-e Parzin

Population (2016)
  - Total: 4,568
- Time zone: UTC+3:30 (IRST)

Kiyaras Rural District (Persian: دهستان كيارس) is in the Central District of Gotvand County, Khuzestan province, Iran. Its capital is the village of Pol-e Parzin.

== Demographics ==
=== Population ===
At the time of the 2006 National Census, the rural district's population was 2,749 in 457 households. There were 4,291 inhabitants in 878 households at the following census of 2011. The 2016 census measured the population of the rural district as 4,568 in 941 households. The most populous of its 31 villages was Shahrak-e Shahid Mohasan Boni Najar, with 1,851 people.
