= Aghili District =

District in Khuzestan province, Iran

Aghili District Persian: بخش عقیلی
- District
- Location within Iran
- Coordinates: 32°10′18″N 48°55′41″E
- Country: Iran
- Province: Khuzestan
- County: Gotvand
- Capital: Somaleh

Population (2016)
  - Total: 18,853
- Time zone: UTC+3:30 (IRST)

Aghili District (Persian: بخش عقیلی) is in Gotvand County, Khuzestan province, Iran. Its capital is the city of Somaleh.

== History ==
After the 2006 National Census, the villages of Somaleh and Torkalaki were elevated to city status.

== Demographics ==
=== Population ===
At the time of the 2006 census, the district's population was 18,105 in 3,562 households. The following census in 2011 counted 19,416 people in 4,535 households. The 2016 census measured the population of the district as 18,853 inhabitants in 4,898 households.

=== Administrative divisions ===
Aghili District Population
Administrative Divisions	2006	2011	2016
Aghili-ye Jonubi RD	7,690	8,120	7,673
Aghili-ye Shomali RD (Note: Formerly Aghili Rural District)	10,415	4,036	3,708
Somaleh (city)		1,606	1,784
Torkalaki (city)		5,654	5,688
Total	18,105	19,416	18,853
RD = Rural District
