= Central District (Gotvand County) =

District in Khuzestan province, Iran

Central District (Gotvand County) Persian: بخش مرکزی شهرستان گتوند
- District
- Location within Iran
- Coordinates: 32°16′23″N 48°47′10″E
- Country: Iran
- Province: Khuzestan
- County: Gotvand
- Capital: Gotvand

Population (2016)
  - Total: 46,210
- Time zone: UTC+3:30 (IRST)

The Central District of Gotvand County (Persian: بخش مرکزی شهرستان گتوند) is in Khuzestan province, Iran. Its capital is the city of Gotvand.

== History ==
After the 2006 National Census, the village of Jannat Makan was elevated to the status of a city. The village of Shahrak-e Shahid Chamran rose to city status as Saleh Shahr.

== Demographics ==
=== Population ===
At the time of the 2006 census, the district's population was 40,206 in 7,878 households. The following census in 2011 counted 44,703 people in 10,277 households. The 2016 census measured the population of the district as 46,210 inhabitants in 11,905 households.

=== Administrative divisions ===
Central District (Gotvand County) Population
Administrative Divisions	2006	2011	2016
Jannat Makan RD	16,029	3,791	4,757
Kiyaras RD	2,749	4,291	4,568
Gotvand (city)	21,428	22,822	24,216
Jannat Makan (city)		6,020	5,360
Saleh Shahr (city) (Note: Formerly the village of Shahrak-e Shahid Chamran)		7,779	7,309
Total	40,206	44,703	46,210
RD = Rural District
