= Gotvand County =

County in Khuzestan province, Iran

Gotvand County Persian: شهرستان گتوند
- County
- Location of Gotvand County in Khuzestan province (top center, purple)

- Location of Khuzestan Province in Iran
- Coordinates: 32°17′N 48°49′E
- Country: Iran
- Province: Khuzestan
- Capital: Gotvand
- Districts: Central, Aghili

Population (2016)
  - Total: 65,468
- Time zone: UTC+3:30 (IRST)

Gotvand County (Persian: شهرستان گتوند) is in Khuzestan Province, Iran. Its capital is the city of Gotvand.

== History ==
After the 2006 National Census, the villages of Jannat Makan, Somaleh, and Torkalaki were elevated to city status. The village of Shahrak-e Shahid Chamran rose to city status as Saleh Shahr.

== Demographics ==
=== Population ===
At the time of the 2006 census, the county's population was 58,311 in 11,440 households. The following census in 2011 counted 64,951 people in 14,975 households. The 2016 census measured the population of the rural district as 65,468 in 16,901 households.

=== Administrative divisions ===
Gotvand County's population history and administrative structure over three consecutive censuses are shown in the following table.

Gotvand County Population
Administrative Divisions	2006	2011	2016
Central District	40,206	44,703	46,210
Jannat Makan RD	16,029	3,791	4,757
Kiyaras RD	2,749	4,291	4,568
Gotvand (city)	21,428	22,822	24,216
Jannat Makan (city)		6,020	5,360
Saleh Shahr (city) (Note: Formerly the village of Shahrak-e Shahid Chamran)		7,779	7,309
Aghili District	18,105	19,416	18,853
Aghili-ye Jonubi RD	7,690	8,120	7,673
Aghili-ye Shomali RD (Note: Formerly Aghili Rural District)	10,415	4,036	3,708
Somaleh (city)		1,606	1,784
Torkalaki (city)		5,654	5,688
Total	58,311	64,951	65,468
RD = Rural District

== See also ==
Media related to Gotvand County at Wikimedia Commons
