= Karun =

River in Iran

Coordinates: 30.4275°N 48.1653°E

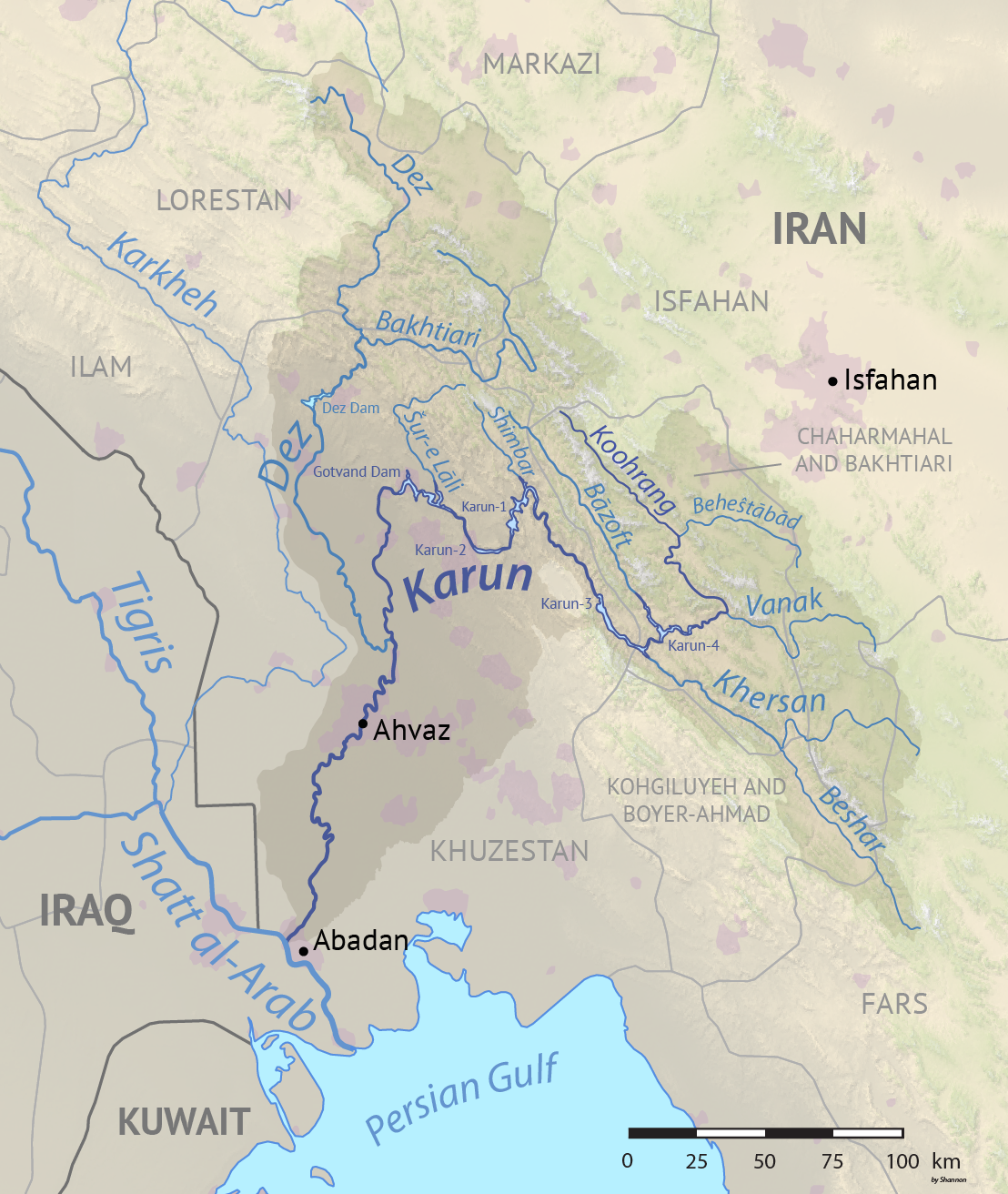
- Map of the Karun River
- Native name: کارون (Persian)

Location
- Country: Iran
- Provinces: Chaharmahal and Bakhtiari, Khuzestan
- Cities: Shushtar, Ahwāz, Khorramshahr

Physical characteristics
- Source: Zard Kuh
  - location: Zagros, Khuzestan
- Mouth: Arvand Roud
  - location: Khorramshahr
  - elevation: 0 m (0 ft)
- Length: 950 km (590 mi)
- Basin size: 65,230 km^{2} (25,190 sq mi)
- Discharge
  - location: Ahwāz
  - average: 575 m^{3}/s (20,300 cu ft/s)
  - minimum: 26 m^{3}/s (920 cu ft/s)
  - maximum: 2,995 m^{3}/s (105,800 cu ft/s)

The Karun (Persian: کارون, IPA: [kɒːˈɾuːn], the Ancient Greek Eulaeus Greek: Εὔλαιος or Εὐλαῖος, Hebrew Ulai Hebrew: אולי) is the Iranian river with the highest water flow, and the country's only navigable river. It is 950 km (590 mi) long. The Karun rises in the Zard Kuh mountains of the Bakhtiari district in the Zagros Range, receiving many tributaries, such as the Dez and the Kuhrang. It passes through the city of Ahvaz, the capital of the Khuzestan Province of Iran, before emptying to its mouth into Arvand Rud (Shatt al-Arab).

The Karun continues toward the Persian Gulf, forking into two primary branches on its delta – the Bahmanshir and the Haffar – that join the Arvand Rud, emptying into the Persian Gulf. The important Island of Abadan is located between these two branches of the Karun. The port city of Khorramshahr is divided from the Island of Abadan by the Haffar branch.

== Name ==
In early classical times, the Karun was known as the Pasitigris. The modern medieval and modern name, Karun, is a corruption of the name Kuhrang, which is still maintained by one of the two primary tributaries of the Karun. J. G. Lorimer also records in his Gazetteer of the Persian Gulf, Oman and Central Arabia that it was known by the name "Dujail," which could be translated "Little Tigris," to medieval Arab and Persian geographers.

== Course ==
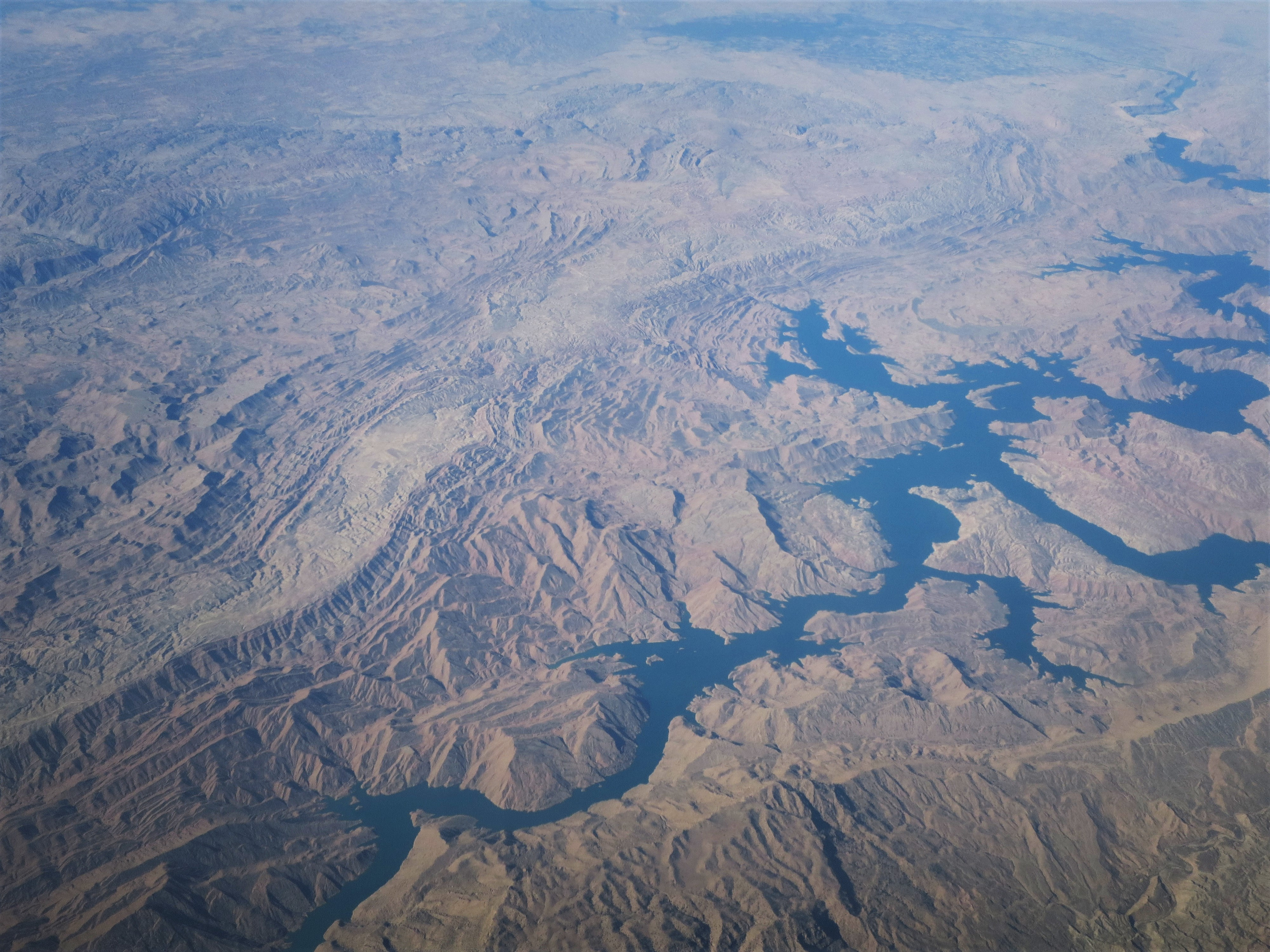
Dammed portion near Masjed Soleyman

It originates in the Zagros Mountains of western Iran, on the slopes of 4,221 m (13,848 ft) Zard-Kuh. The river flows south and west through several prominent mountain ridges and receives additional water from the Vanak on the south bank and the Bazoft on the north. These tributaries add to the catchment of the river above the Karun-4 Dam. 25 kilometres (16 mi) downstream, the Karun widens into the reservoir formed by the Karun-3 Dam.

The Khersan flows into a reservoir from the southeast passing through it in a narrow canyon, now in a northwest direction, past Izeh, eventually winding into the Sussan Plain. The Karun then turns north into the reservoir of Shahid Abbaspour Dam (Karun-1), which floods the river's defile to the southwest. The Karun flows southwest into the impoundment of Masjed Soleyman Dam (Karun-2), then turns northwest. Finally, it leaves the foothills and flows south past Shushtar and its confluence with the Dez. It then bends southwest, bisecting the city of Ahvaz, and south through farmland to its mouth on the Arvand Roud at Khorramshahr, where its water, together with that of the Tigris and Euphrates, turns sharply southeast to flow to the Persian Gulf.

== Basin ==
Catchment area of Karun River (in deep green)

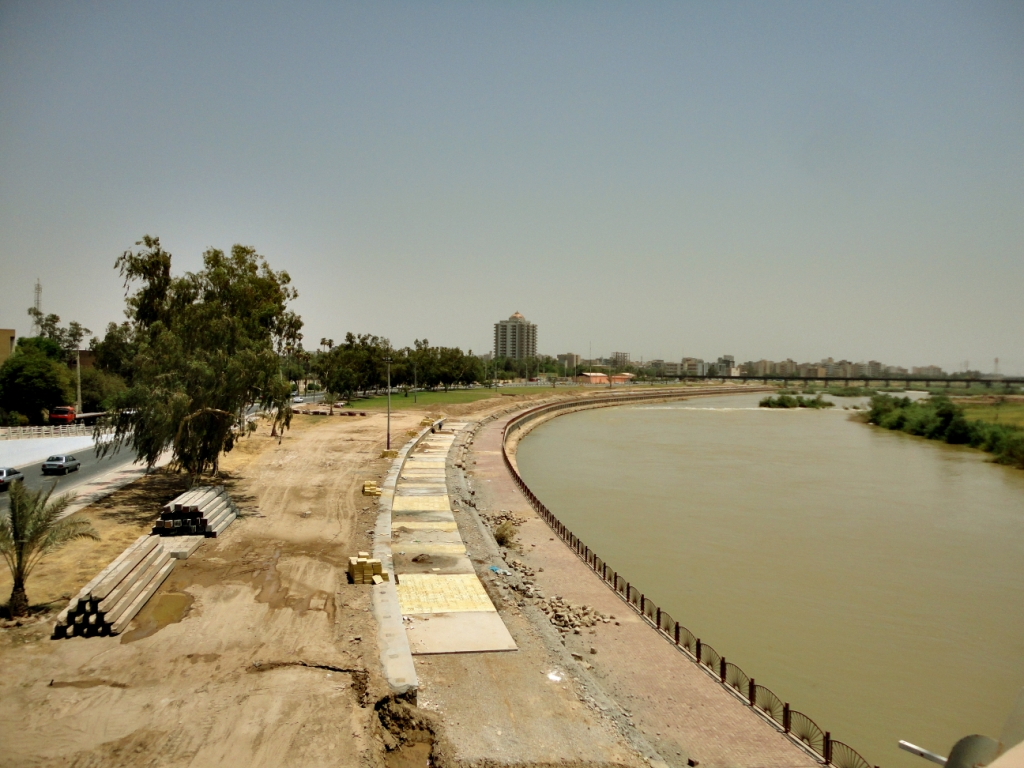
Karun River near the city of Ahvaz

The largest river by discharge in Iran, the Karun River's watershed covers 65,230 square kilometres (25,190 mi^{2}) in parts of two Iranian provinces. The river is around 950 kilometres (590 mi) long and has an average discharge of 575 cubic metres per second (20,300 cu ft/s). The largest city on the river is Ahvaz, with over 1.3 million inhabitants. Other important cities include Shushtar, Khorramshahr (a port), Masjed-Soleyman, and Izeh.

Much of Khuzestan's transport and resources are connected in one way or another to the Karun. Since the British first discovered oil at Masjed Soleyman, the Karun has been an important route for the transport of petroleum to the Persian Gulf, and remains an important commercial waterway. Water from the Karun provides irrigation to over 280,000 hectares (690,000 acres) of the surrounding plain and a further 100,000 hectares (250,000 acres) are planned to receive water.

== History ==
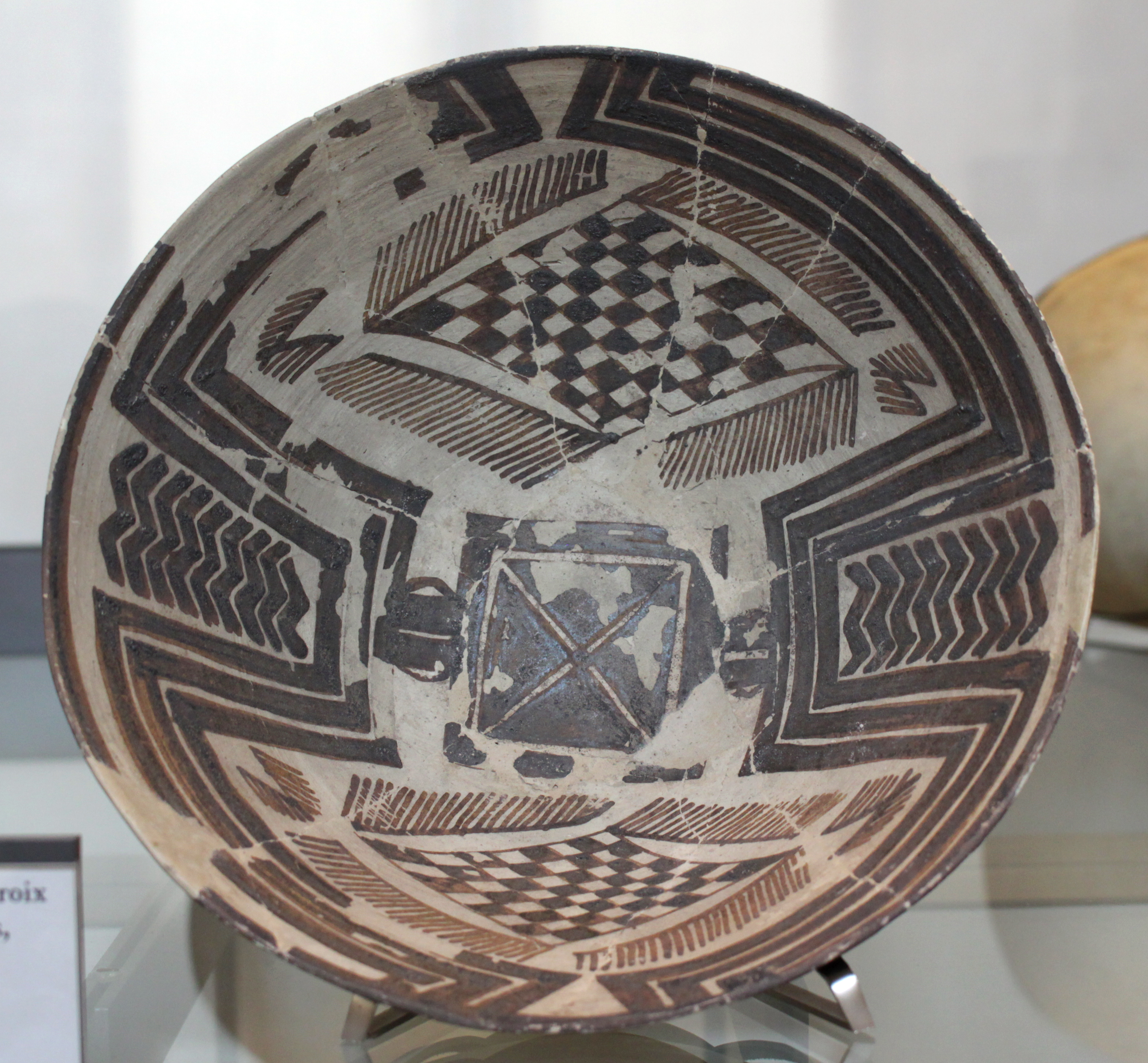
Terracotta vessel with geometrical decorations. Susa I period (4200–3800 BC) - Louvre Museum

Karun River lies between the Susa plain, the location of the ancient cultures dating back to the fifth millennium BC and, to the south, the newly discovered ancient culture of the Zohreh River plain from the same period. The principal ancient site being excavated near the Zohreh River is Tal-e Choga Sofla (fa), which has many parallels with Susa.

Later, the Karun valley was also inhabited by the Elamite civilization which rose about 2,700 BC. At several points in history, Mesopotamian civilizations such as Ur and Babylon overthrew the Elamites and gained control of the Karun and its surroundings in modern Khuzestan. However, the Elamite empire lasted until about 640 BC, when the Assyrians overran it. The city of Susa, near the modern city of Shush between the Dez and Karkheh rivers, was one of their largest before it was destroyed by the invaders.

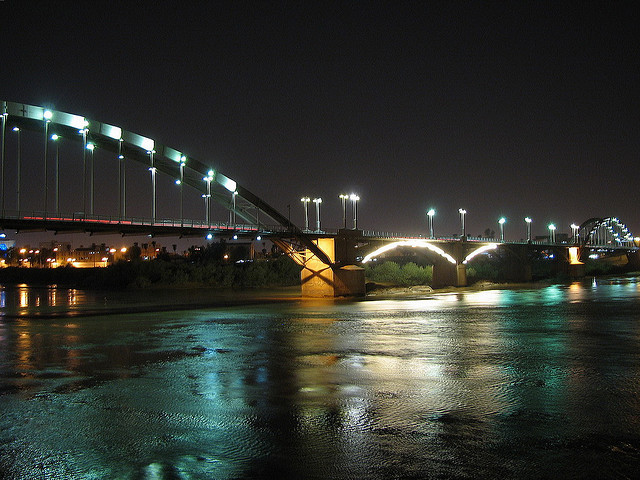
Karun at night

The first known major bridge across the river was built by the Roman captives that included its emperor Valerianus in the Sassanid era, whence the name of the bridge and dam Band-e Kaisar, "Caesar's dam", at Shushtar (3rd century AD).

In two of several competing theories about the origins and location of the Garden of Eden, the Karun is presumed to be the Gihon River described in the Biblical book of Genesis. The strongest of these theories, propounded by archaeologist Juris Zarins, places the Garden of Eden at the northern tip of the Persian Gulf, fed by the four rivers Tigris, the Euphrates, Gihon (Karun) and Pishon (Wadi al-Batin).

In 1888, during a period of increasing British influence in southern Iran, Lynch Brothers opened the first regular steamship service on the river linking Khorramshahr and Ahvaz.

The name of the river is derived from the mountain peak, Kuhrang, which serves as its source. The film documentary, Grass: A Nation's Battle for Life (1925), tells the story of the Bakhtiari tribe crossing this river.

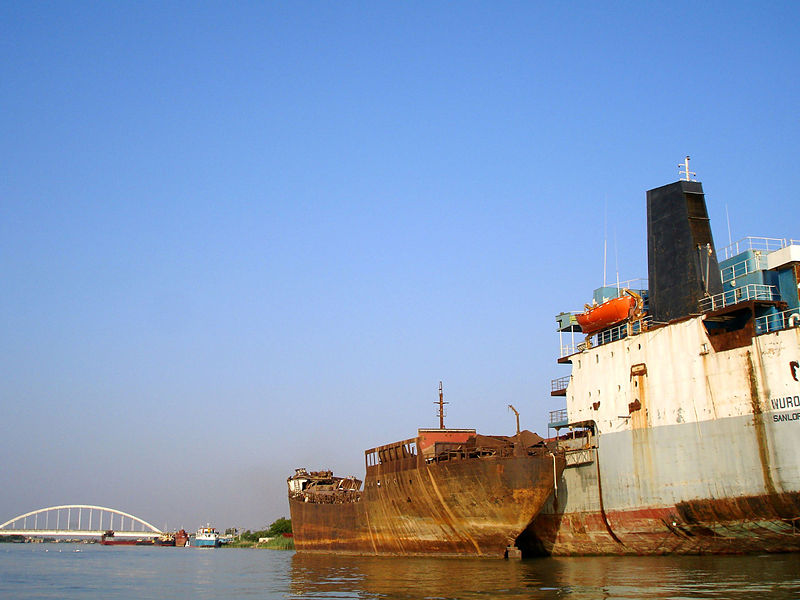
Derelict vessels and a bridge over the Karun in Khorramshahr

It was here during the Iran–Iraq War that the Islamic Republic of Iran Armed Forces stopped the early Iraqi Armed Forces advance. With its limited military stocks, Iran unveiled its "human wave" assaults which used thousands of Basij (Popular Mobilization Army or People's Army) volunteers.

In September 2009, three districts of Basra province in southern Iraq were declared disaster-hit areas as a result of Iran's construction of new dams on the Karun. The new dams resulted in high levels of salinity in the Arvand Roud (Shatt al-Arab), which destroyed farm areas and threatened livestock in that Iraqi Basra area. Civilians in the area were forced to evacuate.

== Dams ==
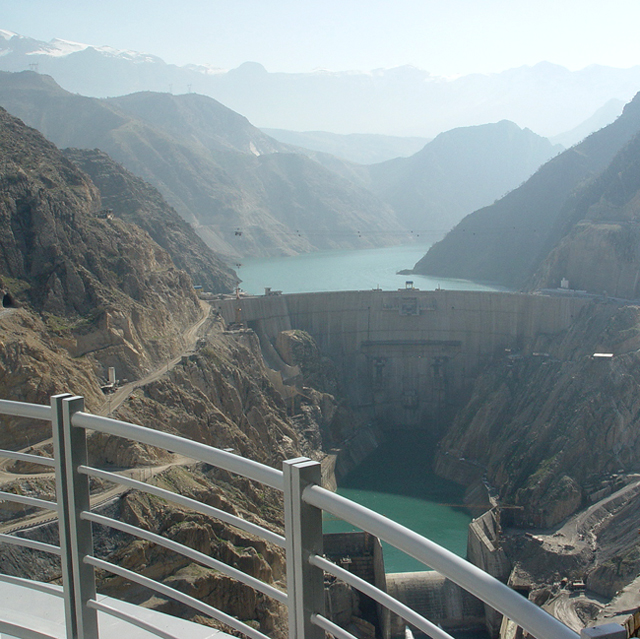
The Karun-3 dam, one of the many large hydroelectric power dams on the Karun River

There are a number of dams on the Karun River, mainly built to generate hydroelectric power and provide flood control. Gotvand Dam, Masjed Soleyman Dam, Karun-1 (Shahid Abbaspour Dam), Karun-3, and Karun-4, most of them owned by the Iran Water and Power Resources Development Co., are all on the main stem. Karun-2 would potentially be located in the Sussan Plain between Shahid Abbaspour and Karun-3, but the project is still under consideration because of concern over submerging archaeological sites.

A Karun-5 dam upstream of Karun-4 has also been proposed. The Masjed Soleyman, Shahid Abbaspour, and Karun-3 dams each generate 1,000–2,000 MW of power to service the peaking power sector of Iran's electricity grid, and when completed, Karun-4 will also generate 1,000 MW. There are also many dams on the river's tributaries. Dez Dam, Bakhtiari Dam (under construction) and Khersan-3 Dam (under construction) are among them. Khersan 1, Khersan 2, Zalaki, Liro, Roudbar Lorestan, Bazoft, and others are proposed. The dams on the Karun have had a significant effect on the sediment transport and the ecology of the river, and have required the relocation of thousands of residents.

== In culture ==
Juris Zarins and other scholars have identified the Karun as one of the four rivers of Eden (Gihon), the others being the Tigris, the Euphrates, and either the Wadi al-Batin or the Karkheh.

== See also ==
- Ulai
