= List of Martian canals =

This is an incomplete list of Martian canals from the erroneous belief in the late 19th and early 20th centuries that "Martian canals" existed on the surface of the red planet. These canals were named by Giovanni Schiaparelli and Percival Lowell, amongst others, after real and legendary rivers of various places on Earth or the mythological underworld. A partial list of names are provided below with the regions that the canals were thought to connect.

== A ==
Name	Pronunciation	Locationˈ	Source of name
Acalandrus	/ˌækəˈlændrəs/		From a stream in Lucania, Italy, now called Calandro
Acampsis	/əˈkæmpsɪs/		From a river in Pontus that flowed into the Black Sea, now called Çoruh/Chorokhi
Acesines	/æsɪˈsaɪniːz/		From a Sicilian river, now called Cantara; also the name of Chenab, one of the rivers of the Punjab
Achana	/ˈækənə/		From a river in northern Arabia
Achates	/əˈkeɪtiːz/		From a Sicilian river now called the Drillo, in which agates were found
Acheloüs	/ˌækɪˈloʊəs/		From Achelous, a river in western Greece
Acheron	/ˈækərɒn/		From Acheron, both a real river in Epirus and a mythical river of Hades
Acis	/ˈeɪsɪs/		From a Sicilian river now called Fiume di Iaci
Aeacus	/ˈiːəkəs/	N to S: runs through Cebrenia to the junction of Styx and Boreas canals	
Aeolus	/ˈiːoʊləs/		From Aeolus, keeper of the winds in Greek mythology
Aesis	/ˈiːsɪs/		From an Italian river, now called Fiumesino
Aethiops	/ˈiːθiɒps/		Means "the Ethiopian"
Agathodaemon	/ˌæɡəθoʊˈdiːmɒn/	N to S: connects Tithonius Lacus to Aonius Sinus, opposite Protei Regio; just W of Aurea Cherso	Means "good spirit"
Alcyonius	/ˌælsiˈoʊniəs/		
Alpheus	/ælˈfiːəs/	Runs NS through Hellas	From the river Alpheios in the Peloponnesus of Greece
Ambrosia	/æmˈbroʊʒiə/	S to N: connects Solis Lacus with Bosphorus Gemmatus, running through Thaumasia	From ambrosia, the legendary food of the gods
Amenthes	/əˈmɛnθiːz/		
Amphrysus	/æmˈfraɪsəs/		From a Thessalian river, now called Armiro
Amystis	/əˈmɪstɪs/		From a river of India
Anapus	/əˈneɪpəs/		From an Acarnanian or Sicilian river
Anian	/ˈeɪniæn/		After the Strait of Anián, a mythical water passage in the American northwest
Antaeus	/ænˈtiːəs/	NW to SE: from the junction of Cerberus and Eunostos canals to the Atlantis region	From Antaeus, son of Earth, a gigantic opponent of Heracles
Anubis	/əˈnjuːbɪs/		From the Egyptian god Anubis
Apis	/ˈeɪpɪs/		From the Egyptian god Apis
Araxes	/əˈræksiːz/	E to W: connects Phoenicis Lacus with the E end of Mare Sirenum	From Araxes, a river in eastern Anatolia, northern Iran
Argaeus	/ɑːrˈdʒiːəs/	Flows S from pole to junction of Pyramus and Pierius canals	
Arges	/ˈɑːrdʒiːz/		
Arnon	/ˈɑːrnɒn/	N to S: connects Arethusa Lacus to Ismenius Lacus	From the small river Arnon now in the Kingdom of Jordan
Aroeris		NE to SW: from "Copais Palus" to Ismenius Lacus	
Arosis	/ˈæroʊsɪs/		
Arsanias	/ɑːrˈseɪniæs/		From an Armenian river
Artanes	/ˈɑːrtəniːz/		
Ascanius	/æsˈkeɪniəs/		From the Trojan Ascanius, son of Aeneas
Asclepius	/æsˈkliːpiəs/		From the Greek deity of healing Asclepius
Asopus	/əˈsoʊpəs/		
Astaboras	/æsˈtæbɔːræs/	E to W: connects Syrtis Major to Ismenius Lacus	From a name for the Atbarah river, a branch of the upper Nile
Astapus	/ˈæstəpəs/		From a name for the Blue Nile river
Astusapes	/æsˈtjuːsəpiːz/		From a name for the White Nile river
Atax	/ˈeɪtæks/		
Athesis	/ˈæθɪsɪs/		From the river Adige in Venezia
Athyr	/ˈeɪθɪər/		From a form of the name of the Egyptian goddess Hathor
Avernus	/əˈvɛərnəs/	NE to SW: connects Ammonii Fons to the E end of Mare Cimmerium via Aquae Apollinaris	From Avernus, a river of Hades
Avus	/ˈeɪvəs/		
Axius	/ˈæksiəs/		
Axon	/ˈæksɒn/		

== B-D ==
Bactrus	/ˈbæktrəs/		From a river of Bactria
Baetis	/ˈbiːtɪs/		From the classical name of the Guadalquivir river
Bathys	/ˈbeɪθɪs/		From a river of Pontus
Bautis	/ˈbɔːtɪs/		
Belus	/ˈbiːləs/		
Boreas	/ˈbɔːriæs/	E to W: connects Propontis to Anian canal	From Boreas, the Greek name for the North Wind
Boreosyrtis	/ˌbɔːrioʊˈsɪərtɪs/	E to W in curve between Utopia and Dioscuria	
Brontes	/ˈbrɒntiːz/		
Cadmus	/ˈkædməs/		From the Greek hero Cadmus
Caicus			
Callirrhoë	/kəˈlɪroʊi/		Means "flowing beautifully"
Cambyses			
Cantabras			
Carpis	/ˈkɑːrpɪs/		
Casius	/ˈkeɪʒiəs/	NW to SE: connects Copaïs Palus to Nodus Alcyonius	
Casuentus	/ˌkæzjuˈeɪntəs/		
Catarrhactes	/ˌkætəˈræktiːz/		
Caÿster	/keɪˈɪstər/		–
Cedron	/ˈsiːdrɒn/	NW to SE; connects the Jaxartes canal to Arethusa Lacus	From the Brook of Cedron near Jerusalem
Centrites			
Cephissus	/sɪˈfɪsəs/		From any of several rivers in Greece called Cephissus
Ceraunius	/sɪəˈrɔːniəs/	A broad canal, or pair of canals, running NS from Tharsis down to between Tempe and Arcadia	
Cerberus	/ˈsɛərbərəs/	NE to SW: connects Trivium Charontis to the W end of Mare Cimmerium	From the name of the dog Cerberus that guards the gates of Hades
Cestrus	/ˈsɛstrəs/		
Chaboras			
Chretes	/ˈkriːtiːz/		
Choaspes	/koʊˈæspiːz/		From Choaspes, a river of Susiana, Persia
Chrysas	/ˈkraɪsæs/		
Chrysorrhoas	/kraɪˈsɒroʊæs/	N to S: connects Lunae Lacus to Tithonius Lacus	Means "flowing with gold"
Cinyphus			
Clitumnus	/klaɪˈtʌmnəs/		
Clodianus	/ˌklɒdiˈeɪnəs/		
Cocytus	/koʊˈsaɪtəs/		Named for Cocytus, a mythical river of Hades
Cophen	/ˈkoʊfɛn/		
Coprates			
Corax	/ˈkɔːræks/		
Cyaneus	/saɪˈeɪniəs/		
Cyclops	/ˈsaɪklɒps/	Southern continuation of Galaxias canal, running from the junction of Cerberus and Eunostos to Mare Cimmerium	Named for the one-eyed monster Cyclops of Greek myth
Cydnus	/ˈsɪdnəs/		
Cyrus	/ˈsaɪrəs/		
Daemon	/ˈdiːmɒn/		
Daix			
Daradax			
Dardanus	/ˈdɑːrdənəs/	E to W: connects Niliacus Lacus to Ceraunius canal	
Dargamenes			
Deuteronilus	/ˌdjuːtəroʊˈnaɪləs/	E to W: connects Ismenius Lacus to Niliacus Lacus via Dirce Fons	Means 'Second Nile'
Digentia	/daɪˈdʒɛnʃiə/		
Dosaron			
Drahonus			

== E-F ==
Elison			
Eosphoros	/iˈɒsfɔːrɒs/	NW to SE: connects Phoenicis Lacus to Solis Lacus	Means "bringer of dawn"
Erannoboas	/ˌɛrəˈnɒboʊæs/		A river of India
Erebus	/ˈɛrɪbəs/		From Erebus, a name for the Underworld
Erigone	/ɪəˈrɪɡoʊni/		
Erinaeus	/ˌɛrɪˈniːəs/		
Erinnys	/ɪəˈrɪnɪs/	E to W: connects the W end of Mare Sirenum to Titanum Sinus in Memnonia	From the mythical Erinyes
Erymanthus	/ˌɛrɪˈmænθəs/		
Eulaeus	/juːˈliːəs/		
Eumenides	/juːˈmɛnɪdiːz/	NW to SE: the SE continuation of Orcus canal, from Nodus Gordii to Phoenicis Lacus	From another name for the Erinyes
Eunostos	/juːˈnɒstɒs/		
Euphrates	/juːˈfreɪtiːz/	N to S: connects Sinus Sabaeus to Ismenius Lacus	From the river Euphrates in Mesopotamia, one of the four rivers of the Garden of Eden
Euripus	/jʊəˈraɪpəs/	SE to NW, connects Mare Tyrrhenum and Mare Hadriaticum, running through Ausonia	After the strait between Euboea and Boeotia
Eurotas	/jʊəˈroʊtæs/		After the river Eurotas in Greece
Eurymedon	/jʊəˈrɪmɪdɒn/		
Eurypus	/ˈjʊərɪpəs/		
Evenus	/ɪˈviːnəs/		aka Euenus /juˈiːnəs/
Feuos	/ˈfjuːɒs/		aka Fevos [ ˈfivɒs ]
Fortunae	/fɔːrˈtjuːni/		Means "of Fortune"

== G-H ==
Gaesus	/ˈdʒiːsəs/		
Galaesus	/ɡəˈliːsəs/		
Galaxias	/ɡəˈlæksiæs/	N to S: from Anian to the junction of Cerberus and Eunostos S of Elysium	
Ganges	/ˈɡændʒiːz/	N to S: connects Lunae Lacus to Aurorae Sinus	From the Ganges, a river of India
Ganymede	/ˈɡænɪmiːd/		From Ganymede, the cupbearer of Zeus
Garrhuenus			
Gehon	/ˈdʒiːɒn/	N to S: connects Mare Acidalium to the W end of Sinus Sabaeus	From Gihon, one of the four rivers of Eden Also spelled Gihon [ ˈdʒajɒn ]
Gigas	/ˈdʒaɪɡæs/	NE to SW: connects Ascraeus Lacus to Titanum Sinus via Lucus Maricae	From the mythical monsters called Gigantes
Glaucus	/ˈɡlɔːkəs/		
Gorgon	/ˈɡɔːrɡɒn/	Connects Mare Sirenum and the Eumenides canal near Nodus Gordii	From the mythical monster Gorgon
Gyes	/ˈdʒaɪiːz/		
Gyndes	/ˈdʒɪndiːz/		From the Gyndes flowing into the Tigris
Hades	/ˈheɪdiːz/	N to S: connects Trivium Charontis and Propontis	From the Greek name for the Underworld and its ruling deity, Hades
Halys	/heɪlɪs/		
Harpasus			
Hebe	/ˈhiːbi/		
Hebrus	/ˈhiːbrəs/		
Heliconius	/ˌhɛlɪˈkoʊniəs/	E to W: connects Sithonius Lacus to Copaïs Palus	
Helisson	/hɪˈlɪsɒn/		
Hephaestus	/hɪˈfɛstəs/		From the god Hephaestus
Heratemis			
Hiddekel	/ˈhɪdɪkɛl/	NE to SW: connects Ismenius Lacus to Fastigium Aryn at the western end of Sinus Sabaeus	From the Hebrew name for the Tigris, a river of Mesopotamia and one of the four rivers of Eden
Hipparis			
Hippus	/ˈhɪpəs/		
Hyblaeus	/hɪˈbliːəs/	NE to SW: connects Anian canal to Hephaestus canal	
Hyctanis			
Hydaspes	/haɪˈdæspiːz/		From the Greek name for the Jhelum river of India
Hydraotes	/ˌhɪdreɪˈoʊtiːz/	SE to NW; connects Margaritifer Sinus to Lunae Lacus	After the Greek name for the Ravi river of India
Hydriacus			
Hylias			
Hyllus	/ˈhɪləs/		
Hyphasis			
Hypsas	/ˈhɪpsəs/		
Hyscus	/ˈhɪskəs/		

== I-M ==
Idalius	/aɪˈdeɪliəs/		
Ilissus	/aɪˈlɪsəs/		
Indus	/ˈɪndəs/	N to S: connects Niliacus Lacus to Margaritifer Sinus	From the Indus, a river of India
Iris	/ˈaɪərɪs/	N to S: connects Phoenicis Lacus to Ceraunius canal	Named for the goddess of the rainbow Iris
Isis	/ˈaɪsɪs/		From the Egyptian goddess Isis
Issedon	/ˈɪsɪdɒn/		
Jamuna	/ˈdʒæmjuːnə/	N to S; connects Niliacus Lacus to Aurorae Sinus	From the Yamuna or Jumna, a river of India
Jaxartes	/dʒækˈsɑːrtiːz/		From an old name for the Syr Darya, a river of Transoxiana
Jordanis	/dʒɔːrˈdeɪnɪs/		From the river Jordan in the Holy Land
Kison	/ˈkaɪsɒn/		
Labotas			
Laestrygon	/lɛsˈtraɪɡɒn/	N to S: connects Trivium Charontis to Mare Cimmerium	
Leontes	/liˈɒntiːz/		
Lethes	/ˈliːθiːz/	N to S: connects Hephaestus canal to Syrtis Minor	From Lethe, a mythical river of Hades
Liris	/ˈlaɪərɪs/		
Maeander	/miˈændər/		
Magon	/ˈmeɪɡɒn/		
Malva	/ˈmælvə/		From the river Malua in Mauretania
Margus	/ˈmɑːrɡəs/		
Medus	/ˈmiːdəs/		
Medusa	/mɪˈdjuːsə/		From the mythical monster Medusa
Mogrus	/ˈmoʊɡrəs/		

== N–O ==
Nectar	/ˈnɛktɑːr/	Runs E from Solis Lacus to Nectaris Fons (near Protei Regio)	From nectar, the legendary drink of the gods
Neda	/ˈniːdə/		A river of the Peloponnesus
Nepenthes	/nɪˈpɛnθiːz/	NE to SW: from junction of Thoth and Triton canals to Syrtis Major via Lacus Moeris	
Nereides	/nɪəˈriːədiːz/		From the nymphs called Nereids
Nestus	/ˈnɛstəs/		A river of Thrace
Neudrus	/ˈnjuːdrəs/		A river of India
Nilokeras	/naɪˈlɒkɪræs/	E to W: connects Niliacus Lacus with Lunae Lacus	Means "horn of the Nile"
Nilosyrtis	/ˌnɪloʊˈsɪərtɪs/	A broad canallike feature, running N from the tip of Syrtis Major to Coloë Palus	
Nilus	/ˈnaɪləs/		From the Nile, the river of Egypt
Nymphaeus	/nɪmˈfiːəs/		A river of Armenia
Oceanus	/oʊˈsiːənəs/		From Oceanus, a mythical river surrounding the world and the Titan who shared its name
Ochus	/ˈoʊkəs/		A river of Bactriana
Opharus	/ˈɒfərəs/		A river of Sarmatia
Orcus	/ˈɔːrkəs/	NW to SE: connects Trivium Charontis to Nodus Gordii, where it turns into Eumenides canal	From Orcus, a synonym of Hades
Orontes	/oʊˈrɒntiːz/	E to SW: connects Serbonis Palus to Sabaeus Sinus	From the Orontes, a river of Syria
Orosines			
Oxus	/ˈɒksəs/	NE to SW: connects the Deuteronilus and the Indus canals	From an old name for the Amu Darya, a river of Central Asia

== P-R ==
Pactolus	/pækˈtoʊləs/		From the river Pactolus in Anatolia
Padargus	/pəˈdɑːrɡəs/		
Palamnus	/pəˈlæmnəs/		
Parcae	/ˈpɑːrsi/		
Peneus	/pɪˈniːəs/	Runs EW through Hellas	From the Peneios river in the Peloponnesus of Greece
Permessus	/pɛərˈmɛsəs/		
Pierius	/paɪˈɪəriəs/	E to W: connects Copaïs Palus and Arethusa Lacus	
Phasis	/ˈfeɪsɪs/	N to S: connects Phoenicis Lacus and Aonius Sinus	
Phison	/ˈfaɪsɒn/	N to S: connects Coloë Palus to Sinus Sabaeus	From Pishon, one of the four rivers of Eden
Phlegethon	/ˈflɛdʒɪθɒn/		From the Phlegethon, a mythical river of Hades
Protonilus	/ˌprɒtoʊˈnaɪləs/	E to W: connects Coloë Palus and Ismenius Lacus	Means "first Nile"
Psychrus	/ˈsaɪkrəs/		
Pyramus	/ˈpɪrəməs/	S from pole via Copaïs Palus to junction of Boreosyrtis and Cadmus canals	
Pyriphlegethon	/ˌpɪrɪˈflɛdʒɪθɒn/	NW to SE: connecting Propontis and Lacus Phoenicis	From Pyriphlegethon ("fiery Phlegethon"), a mythical river of Hades
Python	/ˈpaɪθɒn/		From the monster Python which Apollo killed
Rha	/ˈreɪ/		From a classical name for the river Volga
Rhyndacus	/ˈrɪndəkəs/		From the classical river Rhyndacus in Anatolia

== S-X ==
Scamander	/skəˈmændər/	S to N from Mare Chronium to Mare Cimmerium, between Electris and Eridania	From the river Scamander in the Troad
Sesamus	/ˈsɛsəməs/		From a Paphlagonian river
Simoïs	/ˈsɪmoʊɪs/	S to N from Mare Chronium to Mare Cimmerium between Phaëthontis and Electris	From the river Simoïs in the Troad
Sirenius	/saɪˈriːniəs/	N to S: connects the Tanais canal near Nerigos with the E end of Mare Sirenum	Means "of the Sirens
Siris	/ˈsaɪərɪs/		From an Italian river in Lucania
Sitacus	/ˈsɪtəkəs/	NE to SW: connects Coloë Palus to Fastigium Aryn	From the name of a river in Persis
Steropes	/ˈstɛroʊpiːz/		From the name of a Cyclops
Styx	/ˈstɪks/		From the mythical river Styx in Hades
Surius	/ˈsjʊəriəs/		From a river of Colchis
Tanaïs	/ˈtæneɪ.ɪs/		From Tanais, an old name for the river Don in Sarmatia
Tantalus	/ˈtæntələs/		From Tantalus, a mythical king imprisoned in Hades
Tartarus	/ˈtɑːrtərəs/	N to S: connects Trivium Charontis to Titanum Sinus	From Tartarus, a name for the Underworld
Tedanius	/tɪˈdeɪniəs/		From an Illyrian river
Thermodon	/θɛərˈmoʊdɒn/		
Thoth	/ˈθɒθ/		From the name of the Egyptian god Thoth
Thyanis	/ˈθaɪənɪs/		Possibly an error for Thyamus, the name of a river of Epirus
Titan	/ˈtaɪtən/		From the Titans, the relatives and opponents of the gods
Tithonius	/taɪˈθoʊniəs/		
Triton	/ˈtraɪtɒn/	NW to SE: connects Nepenthes canal to the W end of Mare Cimmerium	From the seadeity Triton
Tyndis	/ˈtɪndɪs/		
Typhon	/ˈtaɪfɒn/	E to W: connects Deltoton Sinus to Sirbonis Palus	
Typhonius	/taɪˈfoʊniəs/		
Ulysses	/juːˈlɪsiːz/		From Ulysses, the Roman name for Odysseus
Uranius	/jʊəˈreɪniəs/	E to W: connects Lunae Lacus to Ascraeus Lacus	
Xanthus	/ˈzænθəs/	N to S: connects Mare Tyrrhenum to Promethei Sinus, between Eridania and Ausonia	Means "yellow"
Xenius	/ˈziːniəs/	NE to SW: connects Arethusa Lacus to Dirce Fons	

== Sources ==
- Percival Lowell (11 January 2019). Mars and Its Canals: Classic RePrint. Forgotten Books. ISBN 978-1440039843.
- Percival Lowell (1 January 1908). Mars and Its Canals. The Macmillan Company. ASIN B006X59J1M.
