= Geology of Saudi Arabia =

The geology of Saudi Arabia includes Precambrian igneous and metamorphic basement rocks, exposed across much of the country. Thick sedimentary sequences from the Phanerozoic (including sandstone, anhydrite, dolomite, limestone, chert and marl) dominate much of the country's surface and host oil.

== Geologic history, stratigraphy and tectonics ==
Saudi Arabia is underlain by the Precambrian igneous and metamorphic rocks of the Proterozoic Arabian Craton. Up to 5.5 km (3.4 mi) of sedimentary rocks from the Cambrian through the Pliocene accumulated on the shield, including many oil-bearing units.

Within these younger rocks, a large western facing escarpment formed in central Saudi Arabia, capped with limestone. Basement rock dips away from the escarpment with thicker sediments in the Rub' al Khali and the Persian Gulf region.

=== Paleozoic (539-251 million years ago) ===
2 km (1.2 mi) of Paleozoic rocks are exposed in the northwest, with the lowest 600 m (2,000 ft) correlated with the Cambrian in Jordan. The top 300 m (980 ft) is limestone, although most units from the Ordovician, Silurian and Devonian are terrestrial sandstone or shale.

=== Mesozoic (251-66 million years ago) ===
The Triassic begins with the Khuff Formation shallow water limestone and ascends through 500 m (1,600 ft) of Jurassic shelf limestone and marine shale, overlain by fossil-rich rocks from the late Jurassic and early Cretaceous. Jurassic rocks form much of the escarpment in central Saudi Arabia, although discontinuous sedimentation led to the deposition of calcarenite and anhydrite. The alternating layers of the Arab Formation took shape during the time and hold extensive oil and gas resources. The Kimmeridgian age Jubaila Limestone contains the high productivity Arab-D member in the Ghawar oil field and a 1.1 km (0.68 mi)-long sequence of aphanitic and calcarenite limestone. It often weathers to prominent scarps without talus.

For the most part, Middle Cretaceous rocks include thick sandstone, although some marine rocks are present to the north and Jordan. A combined sequence of 500 m (1,600 ft) of limestone and dolomite spans the Cretaceous into the Paleogene.

=== Cenozoic (66 million years ago-present) ===
The Umm er-Rhaduma Formation is the oldest Cenozoic sedimentary unit in Saudi Arabia, from the Paleocene to the early Eocene. It is visible in the walls of Wadi al-Batin and overlies the dolomite and limestone of the Aruma Formation. The formation spans 1200 kilometers from Wadi Jabaliyah to the Iraq-Saudi Arabia border. Karst commonly forms in the uplands along with river channels. Northwest of Al Batin, the rock has very poor internal drainage. Drilling revealed two monocline structures were related to the dissolution and collapse of anhydrite layers. Dolomite, limestone and chert with some fossiliferous units are particularly common. Dissolved hydrogen gas renders water from the unit poor quality near Ras Tanura, Abqaiq and Nariyah. Saudi Aramco developed the unit to supply water to its outlying operations.

The unit formation is overlain by the early Eocene Rus Formation, named for Umm ar Ru'us. Originally known as the Chalky Zone, it was renamed in 1946. It occurs only a few places, extending 180 kilometers north of Wadi as Sahba and occupying the breached center of the Dammam Dome. Chalk and limestone ascend to gypsum-bearing and calcareous shale. Coastal Saudi Arabia was only submerged briefly in the Cenozoic, limiting marine deposition, although the few Miocene and Pliocene marine rock are divided into the Dam, Hofuf and Hadrukh formations.

The early and middle Eocene Damman Formation is named for the Dammam Dome and includes basal marl, limestone and dolomite as well as the Saila Shale Member. It is exposed above the Umm er Rhaduma but largely overlapped by Miocene and Pliocene sediments and occurs in larger areas near the border with Qatar and in a five kilometer wide, 180 kilometer long belt from Wadi as Sahba. The marl, limestone and shale units taken together do store groundwater and communities in the Eastern Province often draw on the Alat aquifer in the Khobar Member.

Groundwater conditions vary widely within Cenozoic units. Al-Ahsa Oasis and Al Qatif are examples of oases, fed by artesian wells. Al Fufuf has a well-developed Miocene-Pliocene aquifer, likely fed in part by an underlying Eocene aquifer. Neogene groundwater supplies other scattered locations in the Eastern Province. Paleogene gravels form patches in the Wadi Nayyal and Wadi as Sahba. The round quartz pebbles can reach 10 centimeters in diameter, often accompanied by limestone pebbles. In the past, a river may have crossed the Al Aramah escarpment via the Wadi as Sahba structural trench. At the northwest edge of Harrat Hutaym are marl, sandstone and basal conglomerate deposits with ostracode fossils from a freshwater environment, inferred to be from the Pliocene. Small, similar deposits are scattered across the Rub al Khali.

The Al Harrah volcanic complex is the only eruptive feature in the sediment-covered areas of Saudi Arabia. Its olivine basalt and aplite dikes formed during the Miocene, Pliocene and early Quaternary, spanning 250 kilometers to the northwest from Ath Thayat into Jordan. In the northwest, duricrust carapace is particularly common on Paleozoic and Mesozoic units due to greater moisture.

In the last 2.5 million years of the Quaternary, limestone-quartz terrace gravel deposited in Wadi al Batin, occurring 60 to 90 kilometers north of the Trans-Arabian Pipeline Sheet gravel blankets the Ad-Dibdibah Plain, with quartz, carbonate and metamorphic rock grains spanning into Iraq and Kuwait. Al Harrah lava field basalt pebbles make up most of the gravel in the As Sahn Plain. Deltaic sheet gravels are also common in Wadi as Sahba-Wadi and Dawasir-Wadi Najran. In the Al Aramah and Hit escarpment are dissected, older limestone gravels. Nafud desert and Ar Rub al Khali have silt, gravel, sabkha, unconsolidated sands and coral limestone from the geologically recent past. Half of Saudi Arabia with sedimentary cover is blanketed in eolian sands, covering an area of 600,000 square kilometers. Lake beds outcrop in the Rub al Khali while marine terraces are common along the Persian Gulf.

== See also ==
- Geography of Saudi Arabia
- Mountains in the Arabian Peninsula
  - List of volcanoes in Saudi Arabia
  - Sarawat Mountains
    - Hijaz Mountains
    - Asir Mountains
  - Shammar Mountains
