= Dibdiba =

Dibdiba may refer to:

- Dibdiba (Jordan)
- Dibdiba (Uttar Pradesh)
- Dibdiba (Saudi Arabia)
