= Khersan River =

River in Iran

The Khersan River (Persian: خرسان) is a 180km long tributary of the Karun River in Iran (the river with the largest flows in Iran), flowing into an arm of the reservoir formed by the Karun-3 Dam. The Khersan-3 Dam is under construction, proposed to be the most upstream of a cascade of three dams.

The region is mountainous, part of the Zagros Mountains. The river flows through Lordegan County (Chaharmahal and Bakhtiari Province), Semirom County (Isfahan Province), Boyer-Ahmad County and Dana County (Kohgiluyeh and Boyer-Ahmad Province).

As the site of a major dam, the area is a common research area, for example in terms of geology, archaeological value, and management conditions under climate change
