= Bakhtiari River =

River in Iran

Coordinates: 32°56′33″N 48°45′48″E

Bakhtiari

Location
- Country: Iran

Physical characteristics
- Mouth
  - location: Dez River

The Bakhtiari River (Persian: رودخانه بختیاری) is a river in Iran and a tributary of the Dez River in southwestern Iran. Before forming the Dez, the Bakhtiari has a confluence with the Sezar River. Bakhtiari Dam is under construction on the Bakhtiari River.
