= Cephissus =

Cephissus (ancient Greek: Κήφισσος; /sɪˈfɪsəs/), Cephisus, Kephisos, or Kifisos may refer to:

== Waterways in Greece ==
- Cephissus (Argolis), a river in Argolis, a tributary of the Inachus River
- Cephissus (Boeotia), a river in northern Boeotia
- Cephissus (Athenian plain), a river in Attica flowing through the Athenian plain
- Cephissus (Eleusis), a tributary of the Saronic Gulf from the Eleusinian plain
- Cephissus (Salamis), a river on Salamis Island

== Other ==
- Cephissus (mythology), name of three river gods associated with the homonymous rivers in Argolis, Boeotia and Attica.
- Cephissus, a Martian canal, per List of Martian canals
- Battle of the Cephissus, 15 March 1311 conflict between the Frankish Greek forces of Walter V of Brienne and the mercenaries of the Catalan Company
- Cephisus (spittlebug), a genus of insects in the family Aphrophoridae
