= Ulai =

Ancient river mentioned in the Bible

Ulai was the Hebrew name for a river near the city of Susa. It was known as Eulaeus (ancient greek Εὔλαιος or Εὐλαῖος) to the Greeks. It is mentioned twice in the Bible:

- Daniel 8:2 – "In my vision I saw myself in the citadel of Susa in the province of Elam; in the vision I was beside the Ulai Canal." (New International Version)
- Daniel 8:16 – "And I heard a man’s voice from the Ulai calling, 'Gabriel, tell this man the meaning of the vision.' "

In the Koine Greek Septuagint, the earliest Old Greek translation of the Old Testament, in the Book of Daniel Eulaeus (ancient greek Εὔλαιος or Εὐλαῖος) is transformed and appears as Οὐβάλ (πρὸ τοῦ Οὐβάλ Book of Daniel 8:3, ἐνώπιον τοῦ Οὐβὰλ Book of Daniel 8:15 and ἀναμέσον τοῦ Οὐβάλ Book of Daniel 8:16).

The river Ulai is also mentioned in the Epic of Gilgamesh: "May the sacred river u-la-a mourn you [Endiku], along whose banks we walked in our vigor" (VIII-11-12). More details are available at www.abarim-publications.com/Meaning/Ulai.html.

There are three watercourses near Susa, and scholars are divided on which is indicated, although archaeology by Loftus in 1851 and Dieulafoy in 1885 helped shed some light. The Ulai may have been the eastern branch of the Karkheh River (alternately called Choaspes river, in ancient greek Χοάσπης), which at one time divided into two branches some 20 miles north-west of the city. Another possible location of this river is the Coprates tributary of the Karun River. Finally, some claim an artificial canal which ran close by Susa and connected the two rivers mentioned above.
