= Khersan-3 Dam =

Dam in Atashgah, Chaharmahal and Bakhtiari Province, Iran

- Interactive map of Khersan-3 Dam
- Country: Iran
- Location: Atashgah, Chaharmahal and Bakhtiari Province
- Purpose: Power, flood control, regulation
- Status: Under construction
- Construction began: 2007
- Opening date: 2015
- Owners: Iran Water and Power Resources Development Co.

Dam and spillways
- Type of dam: Arch, double-curvature
- Impounds: Khersan River
- Height: 195 m (640 ft)
- Length: 470 m (1,542 ft)
- Width (crest): 6 m (20 ft)
- Width (base): 40 m (131 ft)
- Dam volume: 1,100,000 m^{3} (1,438,746 cu yd)
- Spillway type: Controlled
- Spillway capacity: 6,300 m^{3}/s (220,000 cu ft/s)

Reservoir
- Creates: Khersan-3 Reservoir
- Total capacity: 1,158,400,000 m^{3} (939,130 acre⋅ft)
- Catchment area: 7,733 km^{2} (2,986 mi^{2})
- Surface area: 24.5 km^{2} (9 mi^{2})
- Maximum length: 40 km (25 mi)
- Maximum width: 400 m (1,312 ft) (average)
- Normal elevation: 1,432 m (4,698 ft)

Power Station
- Commission date: 2015
- Hydraulic head: 177 m (581 ft) (design)
- Turbines: 4 x 100 MW Francis-type
- Installed capacity: 400 MW
- Annual generation: 1121 GWh

Khersan-3 dam is a hydroelectric arch dam currently under construction on the Khersan River, a tributary of the Karun River, in Iran. When complete it will have an installed capacity of 400 MW. It is situated near Atashgah in Chaharmahal and Bakhtiari Province and is a complementary dam to Khersan project along with the proposed Khersan-1 and Khersan-2 dams. Construction began in 2007 and it is expected to become operational in 2015.

== See also ==
- List of power stations in Iran
- Dams in Iran
