= Bakhtiari Dam =

Dam in Khuzestan, Iran

- Interactive map of Bakhtiari Dam
- Country: Iran
- Location: Aligudarz County, Lorestan
- Status: Under construction
- Construction began: 25 March 2013
- Opening date: Unknown
- Construction cost: $2 billion USD

Dam and spillways
- Type of dam: Arch
- Impounds: Bakhtiari River
- Height: 325 m (1,066 ft)
- Length: 434 m (1,424 ft)
- Width (crest): 10 m (33 ft)
- Width (base): 30 m (98 ft)
- Dam volume: 3,100,000 m^{3} (109,475,467 ft^{3})
- Spillway type: Service, gate-controlled
- Spillway capacity: 5,830 m^{3}/s (205,885 cu ft/s)

Reservoir
- Creates: Bakhtiari Reservoir
- Total capacity: 4,845,000,000 m^{3} (3,927,905 acre⋅ft)
- Catchment area: 6,288 km^{2} (2,428 mi^{2})
- Surface area: 58.7 km^{2} (23 mi^{2})

Power Station
- Hydraulic head: 289 m (948 ft) (max.)
- Turbines: 6 × 250 MW Francis type
- Installed capacity: 1,500 MW
- Annual generation: 3 billion kWh (est.)
- Website en.iwpco.ir/Bakhtiari/

The Bakhtiari Dam is an arch dam currently under construction on the Bakhtiari River within the Zagros Mountains on the border of Lorestan and Khuzestan provinces, Iran. At a planned height of 325 metres (1,066 ft), it will be the world's tallest dam once completed and withhold the second largest reservoir in Iran after the Karkheh reservoir. The main purpose of the dam is hydroelectric power production and it will support a 1,500 MW power station. By trapping sediment, the dam is also expected to extend the life of the Dez Dam 50 km (31 mi) downstream.

== Background ==
Preliminary studies for the dam began in 1996 and were carried out by Mahab Qods Consulting Engineers. The studies were carried out over a period of 33 months and in March 2000, the results were given to Iran Water & Power Resources Development Co (IWPCO). In May 2005, IWPCO awarded consultation services for the project to Moshanir Consulting Engineers, Dezab Consulting Engineers, Econo-Electrowatt/Boyri and Stucky Pars Consulting Engineers. On April 30, 2007, the $2 billion construction contract, to be funded with direct investment from China, was awarded to China's Sinohydro Corporation. Sinohydro signed the 118-month contract on March 15, 2011, and was expected to be working with Iran's Farab. But the Iranian government rejected Sinohydro's bid in late May 2012 and handed the project over to Khatam al-Anbiya Construction Headquarters (KAA), which is controlled by the Iranian Revolutionary Guard Corps. The KAA commander announced on 19 December 2012 that construction of the dam had begun with access roads leading to the project site. On 25 March 2013, Iranian President Mahmood Ahmadinejad attended a groundbreaking ceremony for the dam, initiating its construction.

== Construction ==
During construction, a total of six bridges will be built to support workers, vehicles and equipment in addition to various access roads. To divert the river, two tunnels, 1,151 m (3,776 ft) and 1,180 m (3,871 ft) in length will be constructed at the dam's left abutment. They will have discharge capacities of 2,090 m^{3}/s (73,808 cu ft/s) and 1,680 m^{3}/s (59,329 cu ft/s) respectively. To divert the water, two roller-compacted concrete cofferdams will be constructed. The upstream cofferdam will be 51 m (167 ft) high and the downstream 25 m (82 ft). Material to construct the dam including aggregate will come from the actual excavation of the dam site along with three quarries in the area.

== Design ==
The Bakhtiari will be a 325 m (1,066 ft) tall and 434 m (1,424 ft) long variable-radius arch dam. It will be 10 m (33 ft) wide at its crest and 30 m (98 ft) wide at its base while being composed of 3,100,000 m^{3} (109,475,467 ft^{3}) of concrete. The dam's reservoir will have a normal capacity of 4,845,000,000 m^{3} (3,927,905 acre⋅ft) and an active or "useful" capacity of 3,070,000,000 m^{3} (2,488,890 acre⋅ft). At a normal elevation of 830 m (2,723 ft) above sea level, the reservoir will have a surface area of 58.7 km^{2} (23 mi^{2}), maximum width of 1 km (1 mi) and length of 59 km (37 mi). Its catchment area will be 6,288 km^{2} (2,428 mi^{2}).

The dam will contain two spillways. The main service spillway will be an 11 m (36 ft) diameter tunnel in the right abutment with two flood gates. The discharge capacity of this spillway will be 5,830 m^{3}/s (205,885 cu ft/s). The second spillway will be two radial gates on the dam's orifice with a discharge capacity of 1,510 m^{3}/s (53,325 cu ft/s). The dam's powerhouse will be located underground at the left abutment. It will be 161 m (528 ft) long, 64 m (210 ft) high and 24 m (79 ft) wide; containing 6 x 250 MW vertical Francis turbine-generators. Before reaching the power station, water will be transferred by six 51 m (167 ft) long penstocks. Feeding water to the penstocks is a 504 m (1,654 ft) long headrace tunnel with a three gate intake structure.

== See also ==
- List of power stations in Iran
- International rankings of Iran
- Dams in Iran
