= Masjed Soleyman Dam =

Dam in Iran

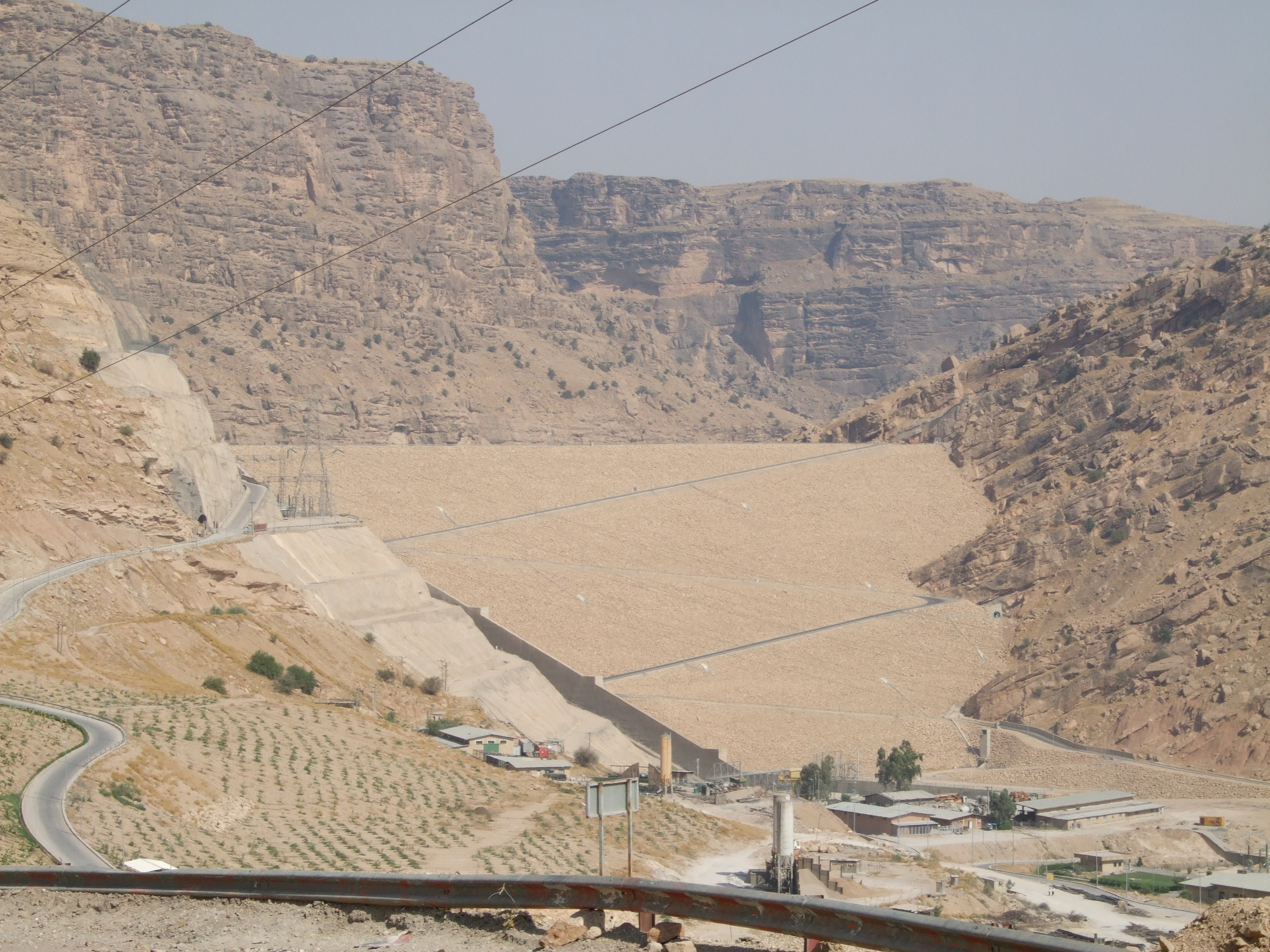

- Location within Iran
- Interactive map of Masjed Soleyman Dam
- Location: Masjed-Soleyman, Iran
- Construction began: 1991
- Opening date: 2002
- Operator: IWPRDC

Dam and spillways
- Type of dam: Rockfill dam
- Impounds: Karun River
- Height: 164 m (538 ft)
- Height (foundation): 177 m (581 ft)
- Length: 497 m (1,631 ft)
- Width (crest): 15 m (49 ft)
- Width (base): 780 m (2,560 ft)
- Dam volume: 13,500,000 m^{3} (17,700,000 cu yd)
- Spillway type: Gated
- Spillway capacity: 21,700 m^{3}/s (770,000 cu ft/s)

Reservoir
- Total capacity: 261,000,000 m^{3} (212,000 acre⋅ft)
- Catchment area: 27,548 km^{2} (10,636 sq mi)
- Surface area: 7.49 km^{2} (2.89 sq mi)
- Maximum length: 27 km (17 mi)
- Normal elevation: 372 m (1,220 ft)

Power Station
- Commission date: December 2002 - September 2007
- Hydraulic head: 140 m (460 ft)
- Turbines: 8 x 250 MW Francis-type
- Installed capacity: 2,000 MW
- Annual generation: 3,700 GWh

The Masjed Soleyman Dam (Persian: سد مسجدسلیمان), also known as Godar-e Landar Dam, is a dam in Iran on the Karun river. It is 177 metres (581 ft) high, has an installed capacity of 2,000 MW, and its reservoir holds 261,000,000 cubic metres (212,000 acre⋅ft) of water. The dam is a rock-fill structure with a vertical clay-core. The dam was built by Iran Water and Power Resources Development Co. and completed in 2002. The power station was built in two 1,000-MW stages. The first stage was complete in 2003 and the second in September 2007. The dam was named after the city of Masjed Soleyman, about 25 kilometres (16 mi) away. The spillway gates are believed to be the largest of their kind in the world.

== See also ==
- Dams in Iran
