= Gihon =

Biblical name for the second river in Chapter 2 of Genesis

Gihon is the name of the second river mentioned in the second chapter of the biblical Book of Genesis. The Gihon is mentioned as one of four rivers (along with the Tigris, Euphrates, and Pishon) issuing out of Eden, branching from a single river that split after watering the Garden of Eden (Genesis 2:10–14).

== Overview ==
The name (Hebrew Gīḥōn גיחון) may be interpreted as "bursting forth, gushing".

The book of Genesis describes Gihon as "encircling the entire land of Cush", a name associated with Aethiopia elsewhere in the Bible. This is the reason that Ethiopians have long identified the Gihon (Giyon) with the Abay River (Blue Nile), which encircles the former kingdom of Gojjam.

From a geographic standpoint this might be perplexing, since two of the other rivers said to issue out of Eden, the Tigris and the Euphrates, are in Mesopotamia. However, first-century Jewish historian Josephus associated the Gihon river with the Nile, which is the merger of White and Blue Nile. In the Italian (Venetian) Fra Mauro map of 1459, the Nile is called Gion, reflecting this claim. The scholar Edward Ullendorff has also argued in support of this identification.

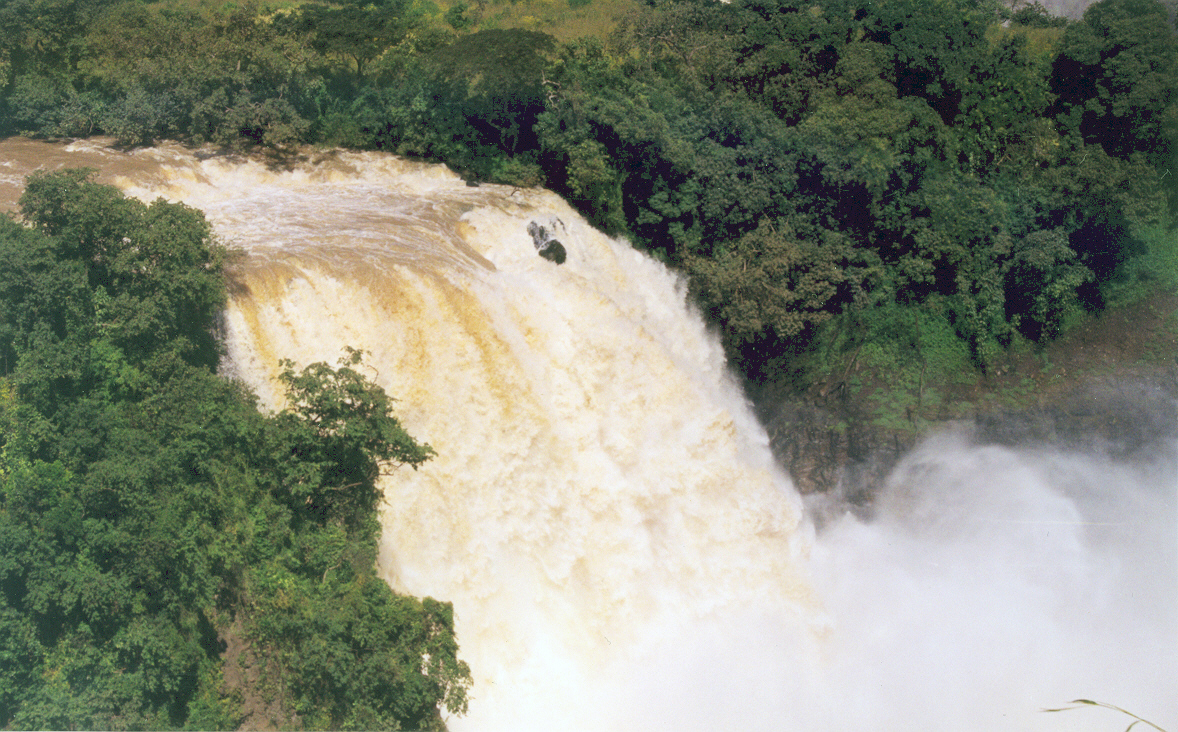
The Blue Nile, one of the rivers conjectured to be the Gihon

Nineteenth century, modern, and Arabic scholars have sought to identify the "land of Cush" with Hindu Kush, and Gihon with Amu Darya (Jihon/Jayhon of the Islamic texts). Amu Darya was known in the medieval Islamic writers as Jayhun or Ceyhun in Turkish. This was a derivative of Jihon, or Zhihon as it is still known by the Persians. A 1929 journal also suggested Gihon was the river Oxus (the Amu Darya).

Juris Zarins identified the Gihon with the Karun River in Iran and Kush with the land of the Kassites, which encompassed a Mesopotamian area that is repeatedly flooded by the Tigris and Euphrates rivers. The Karun discharges into the same general area at the head of the Persian Gulf as the Tigris, Euphrates, and Wadi al-Batin (suggested as the identity of the Pishon, the fourth river of Eden). This view is partly inspired by Herodotus, who thought there was both an African Ethiopia and an Asiatic Ethiopia.

The Sefer haYashar, a medieval Hebrew midrash, asserts that in the time of Enos, grandson of Adam, the river Gihon was subject to a catastrophic flood due to the wickedness of man.

== See also ==
- Jaihan
- al-Qurnah
- Pishon
