= Juris Zarins =

American archaeologist (1945–2023)

- Born: February 17, 1945
- Died: July 8, 2023 (aged 78)
- Education: University of Nebraska

Juris Zarins (Latvian: Juris Zariņš; February 17, 1945 – July 8, 2023) was a German-born American archaeologist and professor at Missouri State University, who specialized in the Middle East.

== Biography ==
An ethnic Latvian, Zarins was born in Allied-occupied Germany at the end of the Second World War, on February 17, 1945. His parents emigrated to the United States soon after he was born. He graduated from high school in Lincoln, Nebraska, in 1963 and earned a B.A. in anthropology from the University of Nebraska in 1967. He served in the U.S. Army in Vietnam before completing his Ph.D. in Ancient Near Eastern Languages and Archaeology at the University of Chicago in 1974. He then served as an archaeological adviser to the Department of Antiquities of the Kingdom of Saudi Arabia before coming to Missouri State in 1978.

Zarins joined an expedition in search of the lost city of Ubar which started in 1992. The team was composed of NASA scientists Ronald Blom and Charles Elachi, filmmaker and archaeologist Nicholas Clapp and British explorer Ranulph Fiennes. Together this team set out to find Ubar and ended up working on one site known as the Shisr site. While there, Clapp decided that what they had found was in fact Ubar. Zarins was not so easily convinced. He discussed Ubar in a 1996 NOVA interview:

There's a lot of confusion about that word. If you look at the classical texts and the Arab historical sources, Ubar refers to a region and a group of people, not to a specific town. People always overlook that. It's very clear on Ptolemy's second century map of the area. It says in big letters "Iobaritae". And in his text that accompanied the maps, he's very clear about that. It was only the late medieval version of One Thousand and One Nights, in the fourteenth or fifteenth century, that romanticised Ubar and turned it into a city, rather than a region or a people."

In 1996, a joint effort from Juris Zarins, George Hedges and Ronald Blom sprang the creation of a website called The Archaeology Fund. This website contains a vast collection of the teams findings in the Dhofar region as well as surrounding areas. It also contains information regarding ancient trade routes and their connection to long distance trade; satellite images of the region not on the Archaeology Fund's website can be found with the NASA Jet Propulsion Laboratory (JPL).

Currently UNESCO recognizes the Shisr site as Wubar (Ubar) which can be found on the official UNESCO World Heritage Fund website.

In 2007, following further research and excavation, a paper partly authored by him narrowed the meaning of the name "Ubar". Rather than being a city, interpretation of the evidence suggested that "Ubar" was more likely to have been a region—the "Land of the Iobaritae" identified by Ptolemy. The decline of the region was probably due to several factors: frankincense trade diminished in importance because of the conversion of the Roman Empire to Christianity, which did not require incense in the same quantities for its rituals, the climatic changes led to desiccation of the area (desert ground-water levels continued to fall and the oases dried up), while sea transport became a more reliable way of carrying goods. Also, it became difficult to find local labour to collect the resin.

Zarins published many articles on a number of topics concerning the archaeology of the Near East, which included the domestication of the horse, early pastoral nomadism, and the obsidian, indigo, and frankincense trades. He received an Excellence in Research Award from Missouri State in 1988. He has proposed that the Semitic languages arose as a result of a circum-Arabian nomadic pastoral complex, which developed in the period of the desiccation of climates at the end of the pre-pottery phase in the Ancient Near East.

Zarins argued that the Garden of Eden was situated at the head of the Persian Gulf (present-day Kuwait), where the Tigris and Euphrates Rivers run into the sea, from his research on this area using information from many different sources, including LANDSAT images from space. In this theory, the Bible's Gihon River would correspond with the Karun River in Iran, and the Pishon River would correspond to the Wadi Batin river system that once drained the now dry, but once quite fertile central part of the Arabian Peninsula. His suggestion about the Pishon River is supported by James A. Sauer (1945–1999) formerly of the American Center of Oriental Research, although still hotly debated in the archaeological community.

Zarins died in New Mexico on July 8, 2023, at the age of 78.
