= Karun-3 Dam =

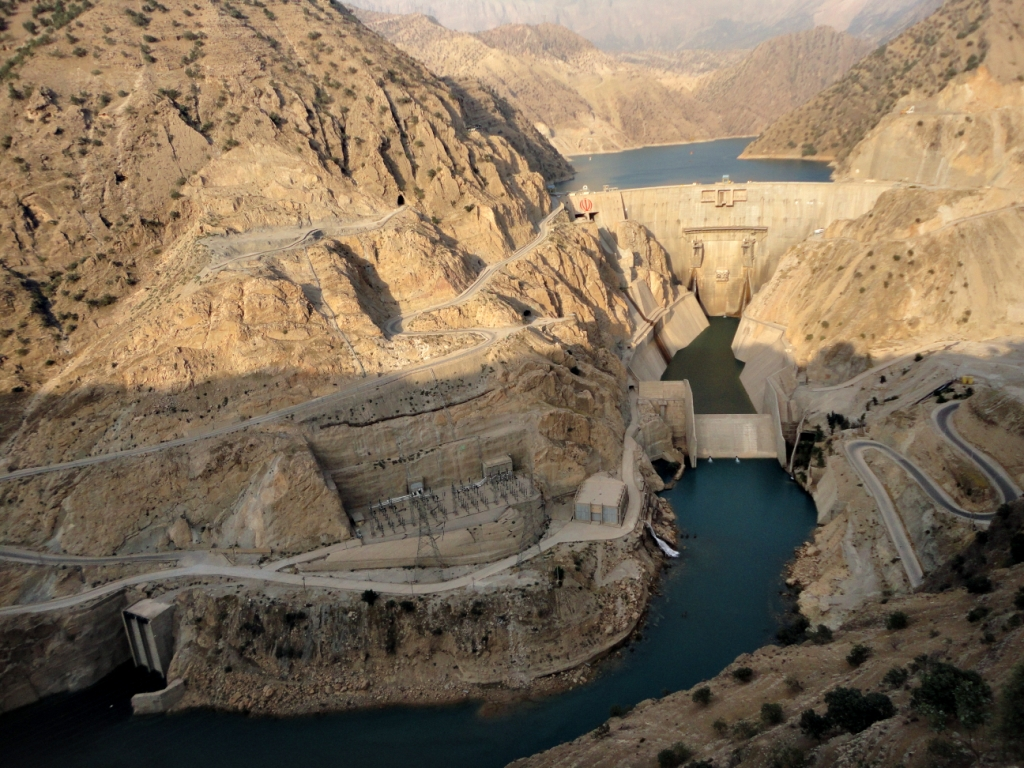
- Interactive map of Karun-3 Dam
- Official name: سد کارون ۳
- Location: Khuzestan, Iran
- Opening date: 2005
- Operator: IWPRDC

Dam and spillways
- Type of dam: Arch dam
- Impounds: Karun River
- Height: 205 m (673 ft)
- Length: 462 m (1,516 ft)
- Width (base): 29.5 m (97 ft)
- Spillway capacity: 15,000 m^{3}/s (530,000 cu ft/s)

Reservoir
- Total capacity: 2,970,000,000 m^{3} (2,410,000 acre⋅ft)
- Surface area: 48 km^{2} (19 sq mi)

Power Station
- Commission date: 2005-2006
- Turbines: 8 x 285 MW Francis-type
- Installed capacity: 2,280 MW
- Annual generation: 4,137 GWh

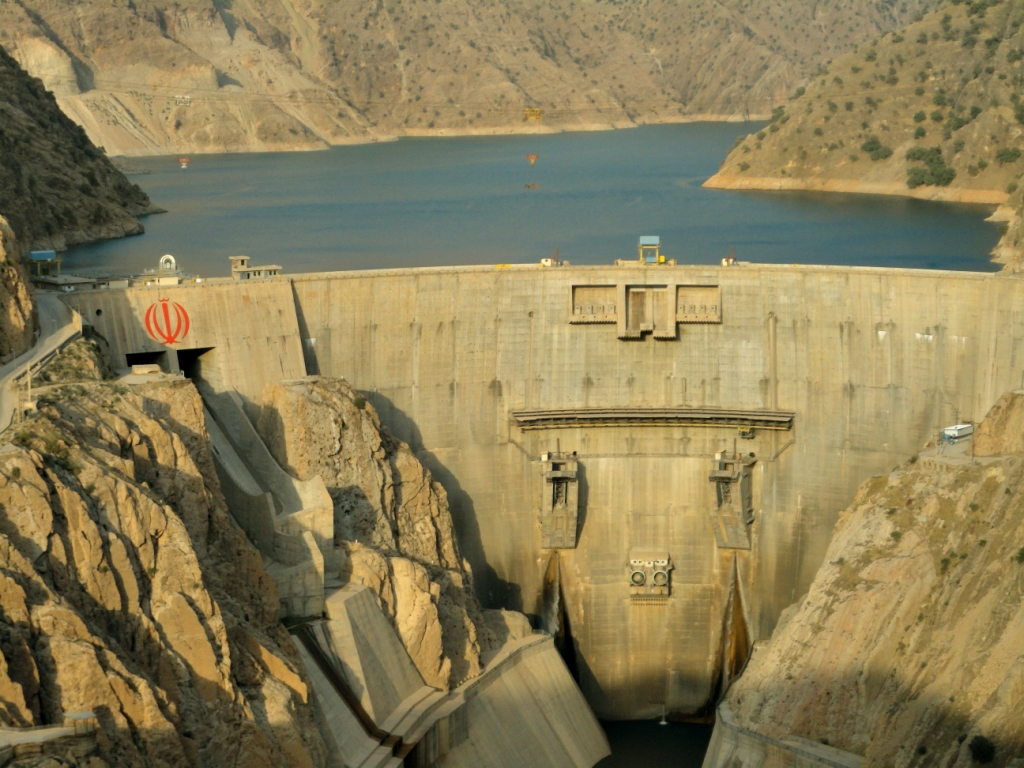

The Karun-3 dam (Persian: سد کارون ۳) is a hydroelectric dam on the Karun river located in the province of Khuzestan, Iran. It was built to help meet Iran's energy demands as well as provide seasonal flood control. The Karun river has the highest discharge slits and seasonal flooding in Iran.

The Karun-3 power generators are connected to the national power grid. With peak power generation at 2,280 MW, average annual electric power generation is 4,137 GWh. The dam has one of the largest generator capacities in Iran which help the electric power shortage during peak demand in the summer.

This dam is of concrete double arch type. It is 205 m (673 ft) high from the foundation and 185 m (607 ft) high from the river bed. The foundation width is 29.5 m (97 ft).

The arch dam design is ideal for this location which has a narrow, rocky gorge behind the water reservoir. Moreover, because of its arch shape, the force of the reservoir water presses downward against the dam which strengthens the dam foundation.

== Gallery ==
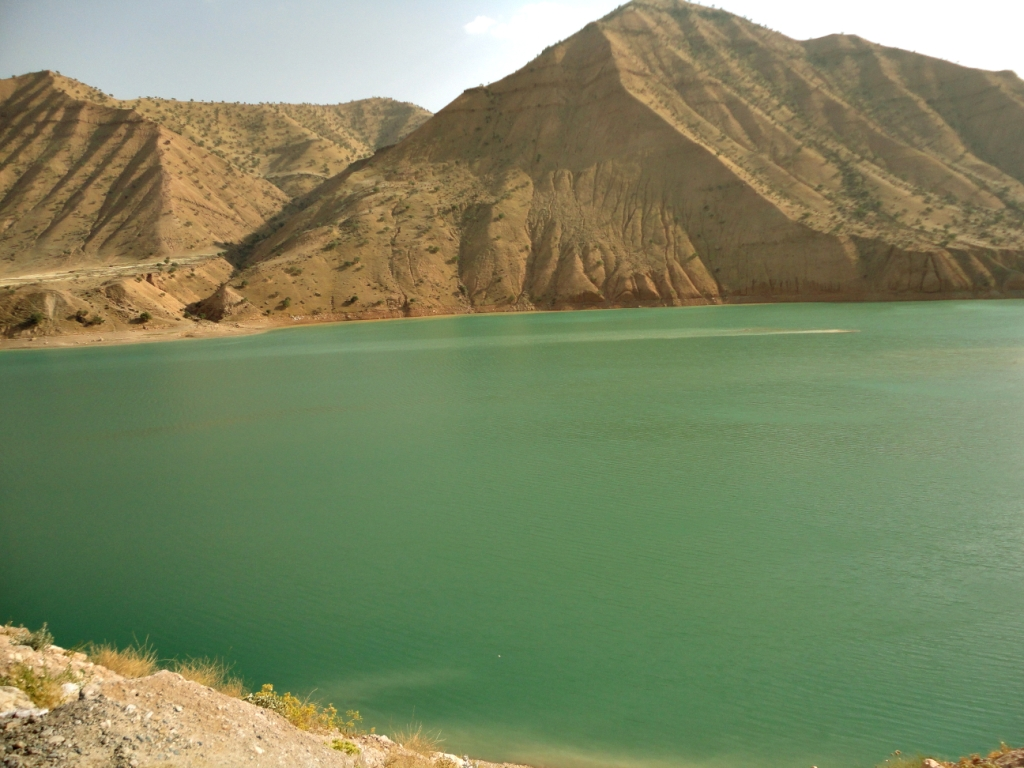
The dam's lake

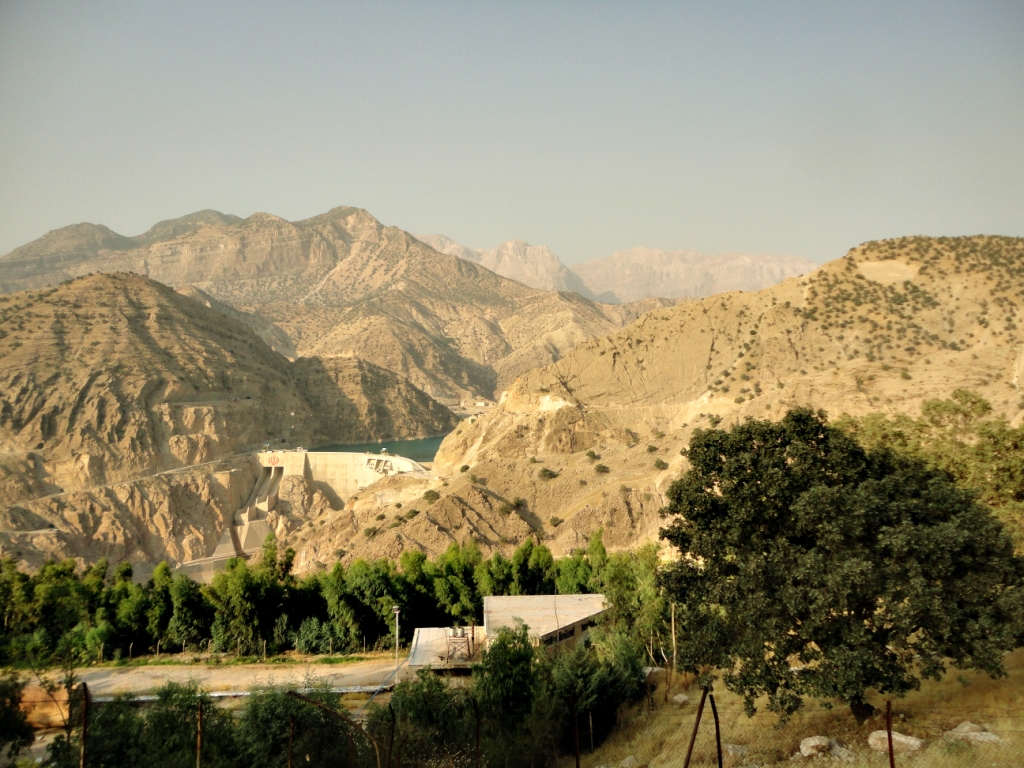

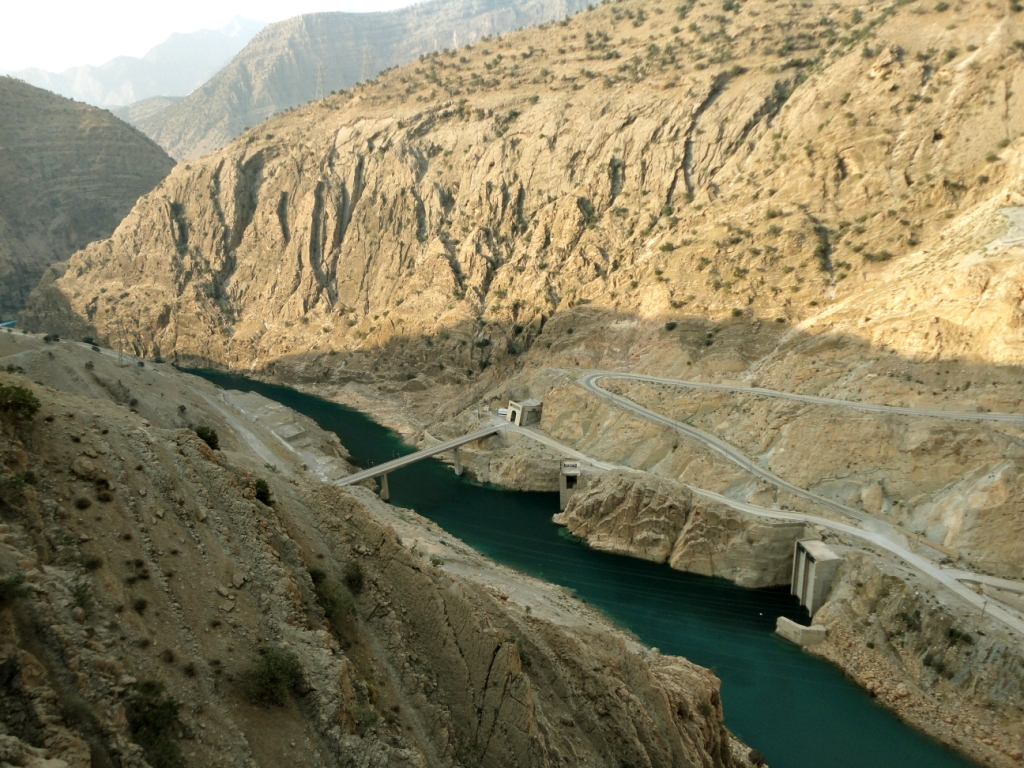

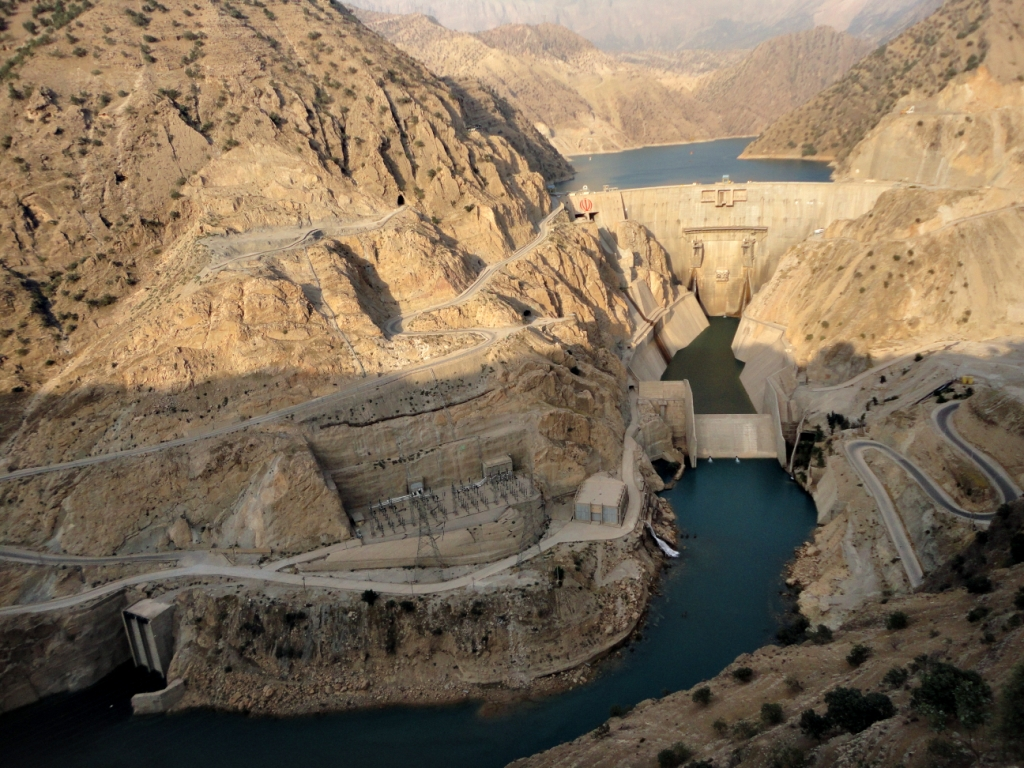

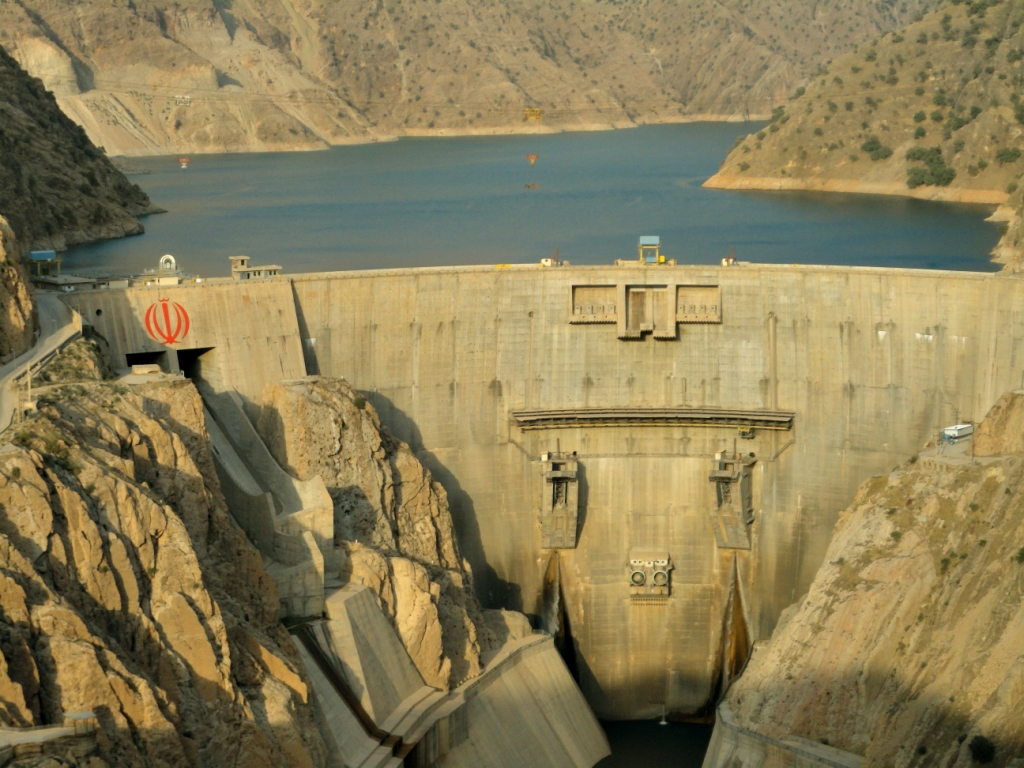

== See also ==
- Karun
- Dez Dam
- Dams in Iran
