= Cephisus (spittlebug) =

Scientific classification
- Domain: Eukaryota
- Kingdom: Animalia
- Phylum: Arthropoda
- Class: Insecta
- Order: Hemiptera
- Suborder: Auchenorrhyncha
- Family: Aphrophoridae
- Subfamily: Aphrophorinae
- Tribe: Ptyelini
- Genus: Cephisus; Stål, 1866

Genus of insects

Cephisus is a genus of spittlebugs in the family Aphrophoridae.

The genus contains three species:

- Cephisus jacobii Lallemand 1912
- Cephisus sanguisugus Jacobi 1908
- Cephisus siccifolius (Walker 1851)
