= Atashgah, Chaharmahal and Bakhtiari =

Atashgah اتشگاه
- Village
- Location within Iran
- Coordinates: 31°14′16″N 50°59′57″E
- Country: Iran
- Province: Chaharmahal and Bakhtiari
- County: Lordegan
- Bakhsh: Central
- Rural District: Sardasht

Population (2006)
  - Total: 382
- Time zone: UTC+3:30 (IRST)
  - Summer (DST): UTC+4:30 (IRDT)

Atashgah (Persian: اتشگاه, also Romanized as Ātashgāh) is a village in Sardasht Rural District, in the Central District of Lordegan County, Chaharmahal and Bakhtiari Province, Iran. At the 2006 census, its population was 382, in 66 families. The village is populated by Lurs.
