= Dibdiba (Uttar Pradesh) =

Coordinates: 28°57′N 79°22′E

Location map Rampur District

Dibdiba is a village in Rampur District, Uttar Pradesh, India. The village lies east of New Delhi, and the nearest large town is Rudrapur.
