= Dez River =

Coordinates: 32.9014°N 48.7311°E

Dez
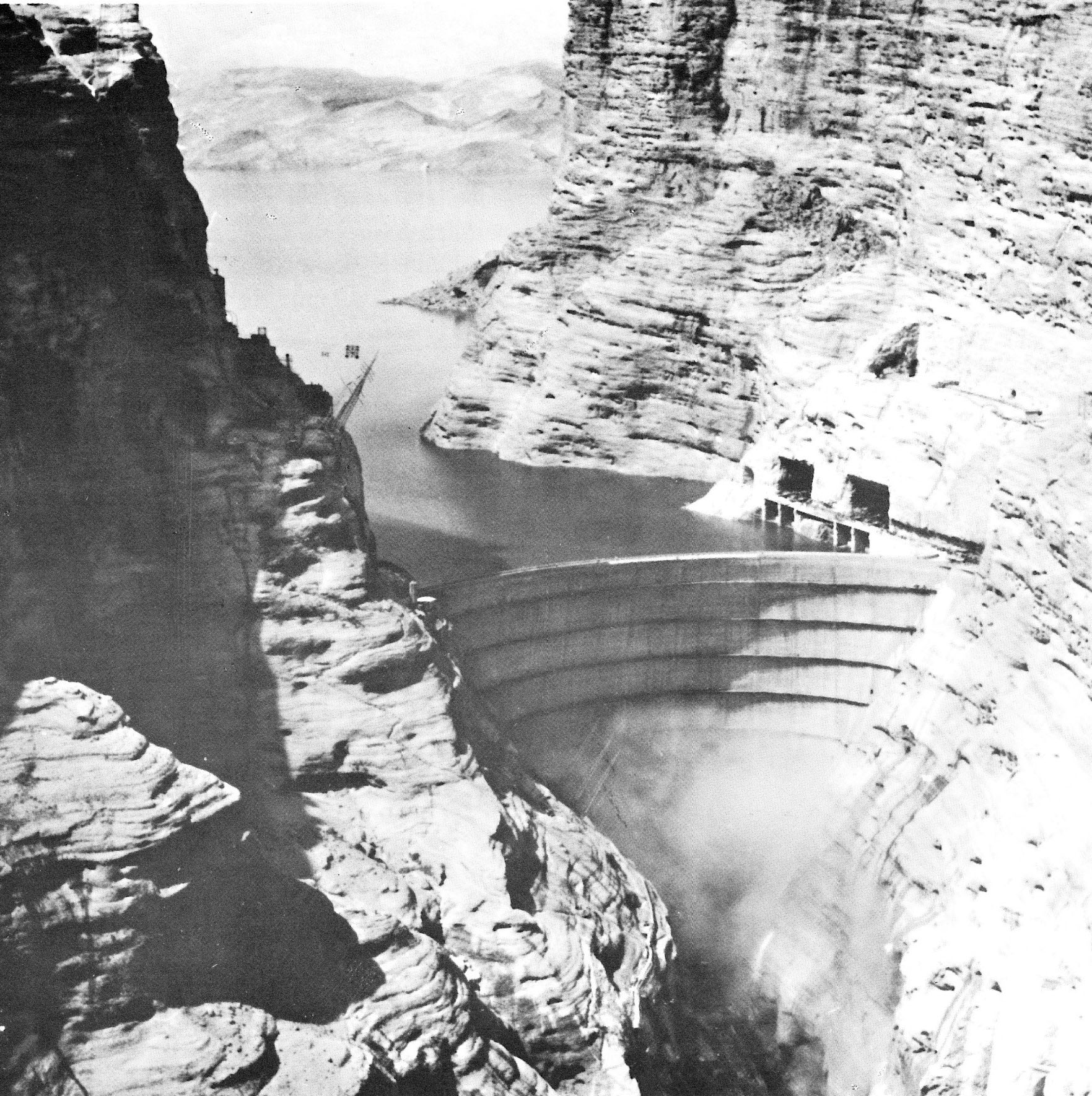
- Dez Dam in Dezful city

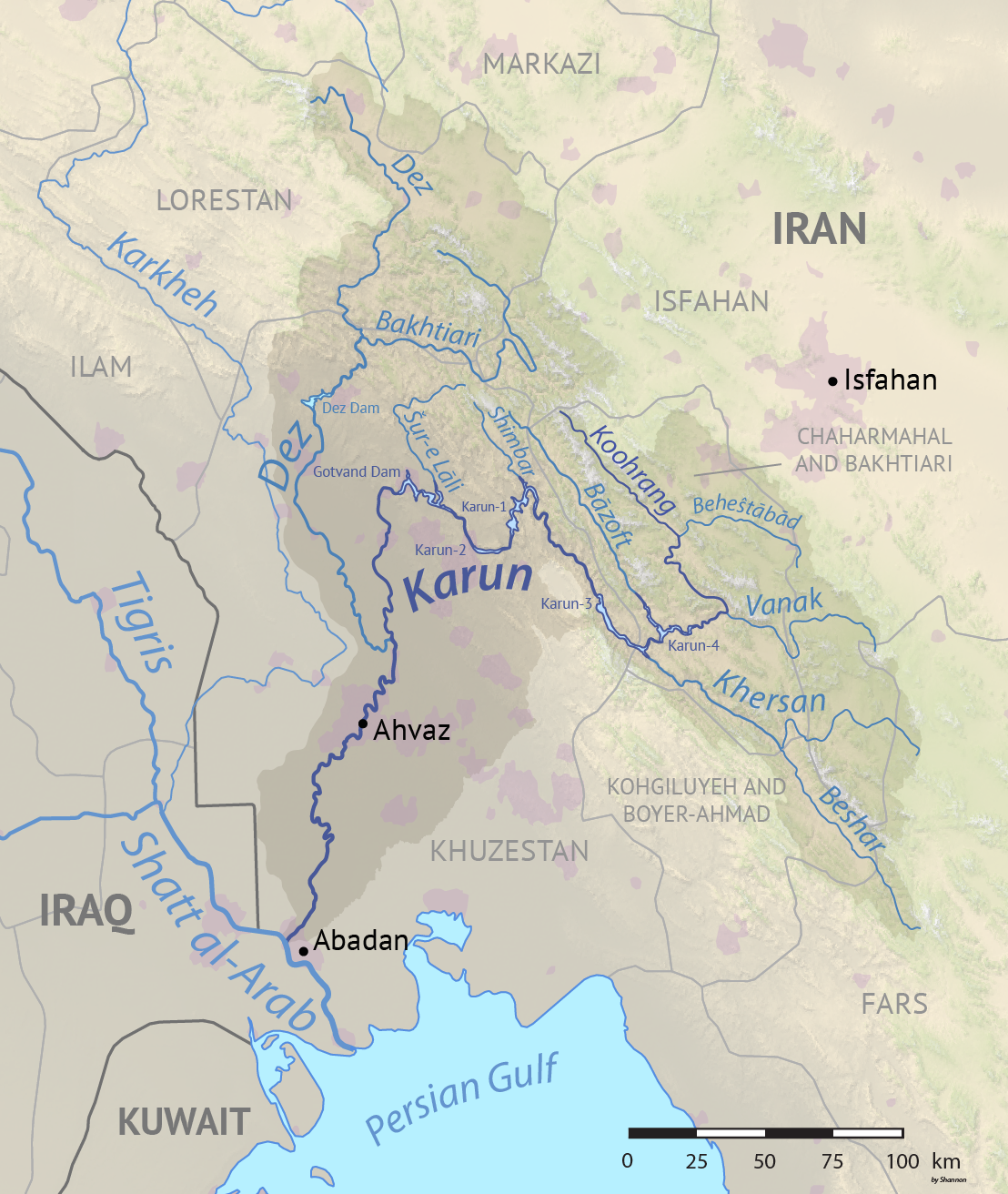
- The basin of Dez River, as a tributary of Karun River
- Native name: دز (Persian)

Location
- Country: Iran
- Province: Khuzestan

Physical characteristics
- Mouth
  - location: Karun River
- Length: 400 km (250 mi)

The Dez (Persian: دز), the ancient Coprates (/ˈkɒprətiːz/; Greek: Κοπράτης or Κοπράτας), is a river in Iran. This 400 km long river is a tributary of the Karun River. It is the site of the Dez Dam.

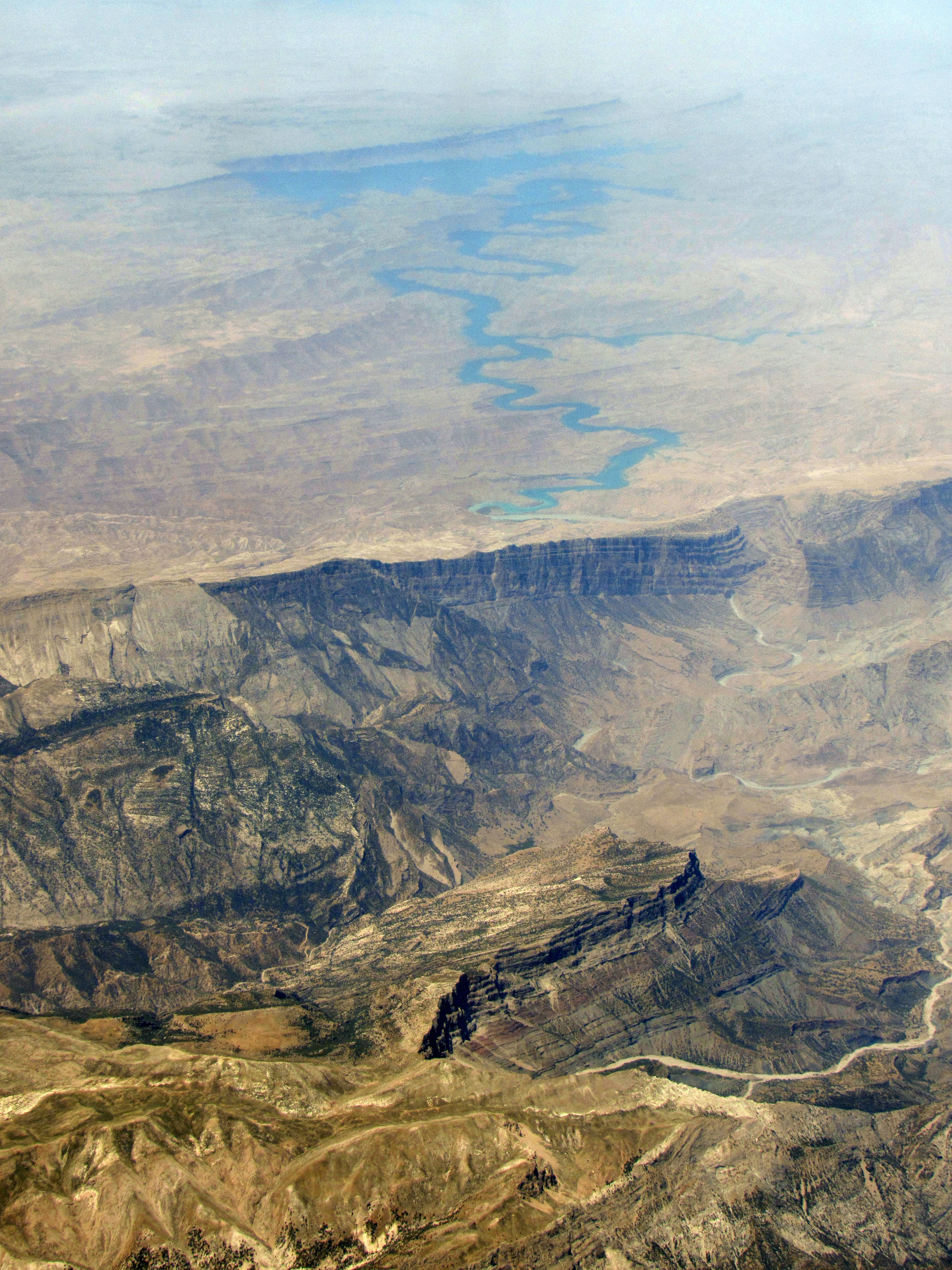
Aerial view of the Dez Reservoir, in the area of Andimeshk, Khuzestan
