= Dibdiba (Saudi Arabia) =

al-Dibdiba is an extensive gravel plain in northeastern Saudi Arabia,

== Location ==
It is at Latitude 27.887482 and Longitude 46.470322, south east of Hafr al-Batin, the nearest large town. The plain is bounded on the east by the western boundary of the Saudi Arabia-Kuwait neutral zone, on the west by the Wadi al-Batin and on the south by the gravel ridge of al-Warīʿa.

The plain extends 20 km (12 mi) northward from Saudi Arabia into Kuwait and has an area of c. 30,000 sq. km.

== Etymology ==
Nomadic tribes live there in the winter on occasion to graze their animals. The name Dibdiba (plural dabadid) is a name given by the Bedouins derived from the name of the noise their clogs make on hard ground.

== Geography ==
The feature is remarkable for its firm, almost featureless surface, sprinkled with pebbles of limestone, quartz, and igneous rock and saline hydrology. Despite its arid climate the area does support vegetation when it rains.

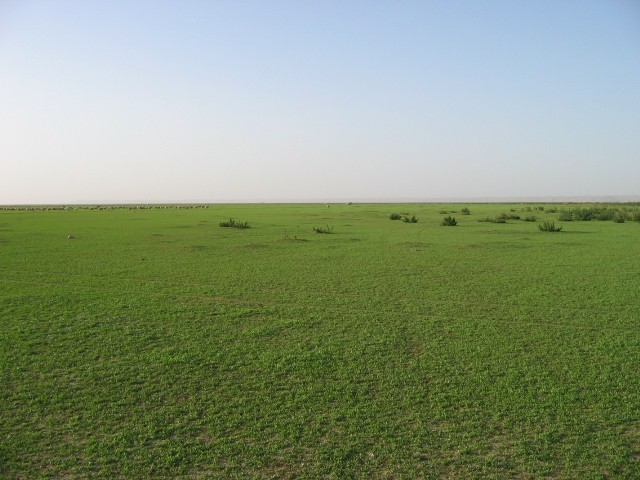
Area around Hafar al-Batin after Spring rains

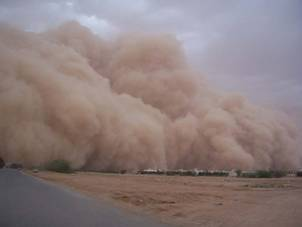
Area around Hafar al-Batin in Summer

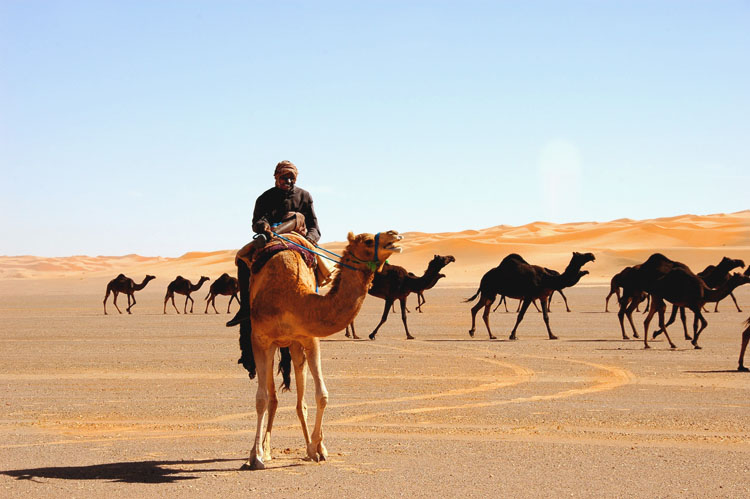
Ad-Dahna Desert to the south

The plain may have been created by the Wadi al-Batin river system which may have been active 3500-2000 BCE allowing for deposition of the Dibdiba Formation, similar to an alluvial fan deposit, both morphologically and sedimentologically). The sediments may be 500m deep.
