= Rivers of Paradise =

Rivers described in Genesis

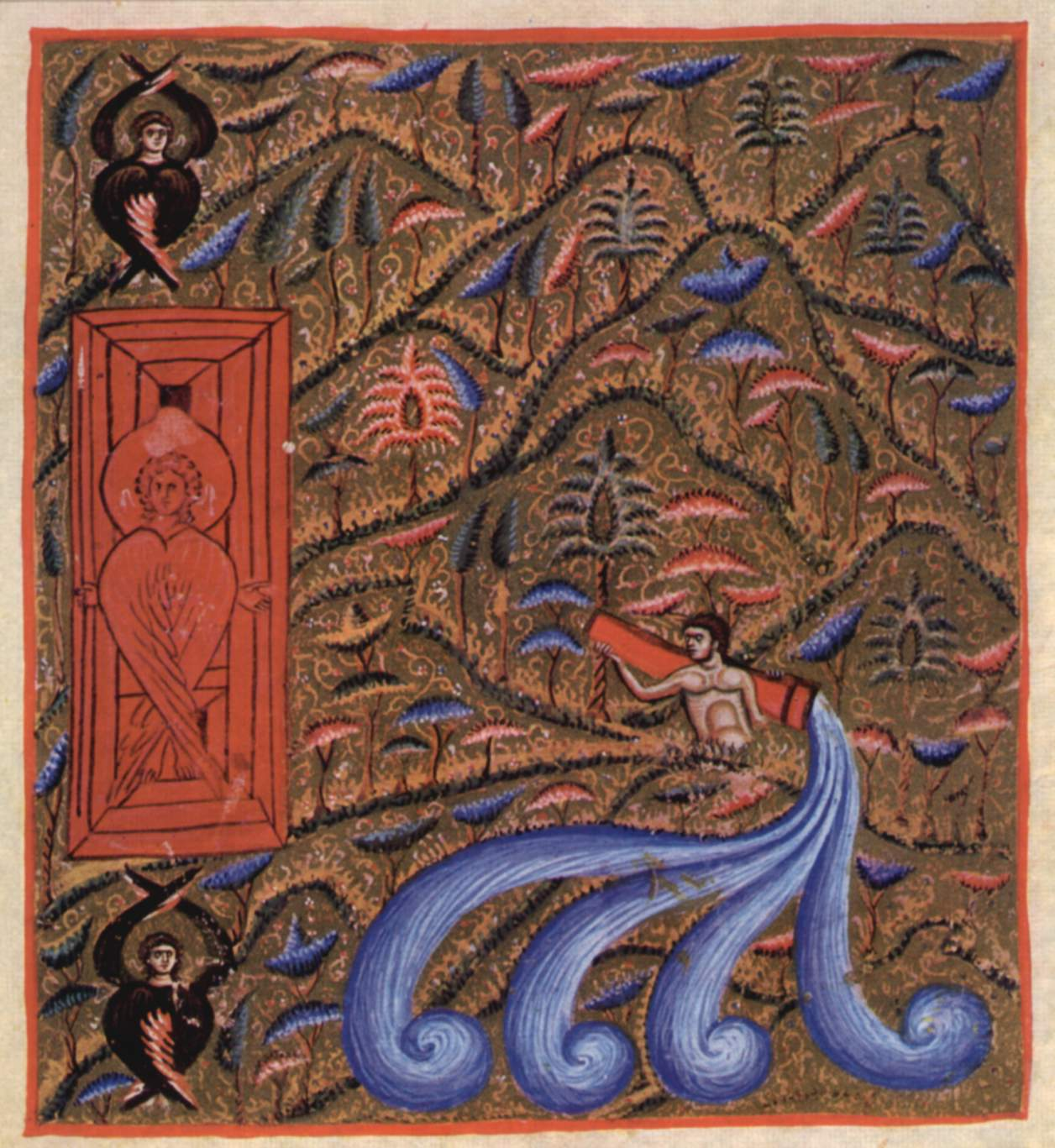
Four rivers of Paradise in the 12th century manuscript

Rivers of Paradise, the four rivers of Paradise, or "the rivers of/flowing from Eden" are the four rivers described in Genesis 2:10–14, where an unnamed stream flowing out of the Garden of Eden splits into four branches: Pishon, Gihon, Hiddekel (Tigris), and Phrath (Perath, Euphrates). These four rivers form a feature of the Garden that is popular in the Abrahamic religions.

== Geography ==
Although some commentators dismiss the geographic attribution for the Garden of Eden entirely, a considerable amount of research was done on matching the rivers in the Genesis to the real ones, on the premise that the Garden was "obviously a geographic reality" to a writer of the Genesis verse (as well as his source), and thus dismissing the physical placement of the rivers is the contribution of the interpreters. To the second group of scholars, attribution of the Euphrates is without a doubt, most of them agree on the Tigris (Hiddekel), but the identification of Pishon and Gihon is ambiguous.

In the Koine Greek Septuagint, the earliest Old Greek translation of the Old Testament, in the Book of Genesis these four rivers appear as Φισῶν (Phisōn) for Pishon, Γεῶν (Geōn) for Gihon, Τίγρις (Tigris) for Hiddekel, and Εὐφράτης (Euphratēs) for Phrath.

For religious scholars, a natural question arises: "How did the heavenly rivers come to the Earth?" Various answers were provided in the past.

== Christianity ==
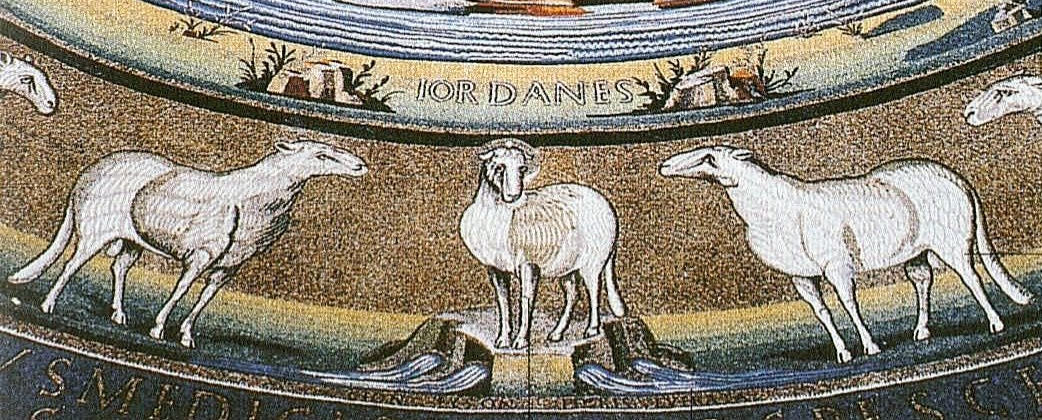
Rivers of Paradise flowing underneath the feet of Lamb of God (mosaic in Santi Cosma e Damiano, ca. 530 AD)

Following Saint Ambrose (per Cohen, the association was established earlier, in a letter by Cyprian in 256 AD) the rivers are interpreted as four evangelists (or Gospels), with Water of Life flowing from the word of Christ (the Fountain of Life) to bring salvation. In Gospel manuscripts the connection was made either in the tituli (cf. St Gauzelin Gospels, Gospels of Lothair) or as an illustration (Vivian Bible). By the 11th century (Uta Codex) through a long chain of exegesis Gihon was personified as Matthew (and associated with happiness), Tigris as Mark (swiftness), Euphrates as Luke (fertility), Pishon as John (inspiration). Pseudo-Jerome's commentary on the Gospels (7th century) contains different associations with evangelists as well as other quadruples, including the four elements and cardinal virtues.

The four rivers of Paradise were frequently used in Christian art in 4th to 6th centuries AD (and later through medieval times, especially during the Carolingian period) in multiple allegorical meanings.

In visual arts the rivers usually flow underneath Christ's feet or from His throne (cf. apse mosaics in Santa Costanza, Santi Cosma e Damiano, Santa Prassede, Santa Pudenziana, San Clemente al Laterano, Archbasilica of Saint John Lateran, Basilica of San Vitale). Two stags are occasionally depicted drinking from the streams, referring to Psalm 42: "As a deer longs for flowing streams, so my soul longs for you, O God". On the North portal of Cathedral of Chartres the rivers are depicted as young men carrying vessels with outflowing water.

== Judaism ==
The rabbinic tradition does not interpret rivers literally, instead, they are believed to represent honey, milk, balsam, and wine. Genesis Rabbah identifies the rivers as four corners of the world: Pishon as Babylonia, Gihon as Media, Hiddekel as Greece, Euphrates as Rome. It also states that all waters in the world flow from the foot of the Tree of Life.

== Islam ==
Similarly to Judaism, Islam treats the rivers of Paradise (anhār al-janna) as carrying the honey, milk, water, and wine (cf. Q 47:15). However, Hosseinizadeh remarks that these are not the same rivers as in the Bible, since there are four types of rivers, not four rivers in this verse. Furthermore, there are more types discussed elsewhere in Quran (cf. Q 76:5-6 and Salsabil in Q 76:17-18), so there is no significant relationship between the biblical rivers of Paradise and the ones in Quran.

Quran uses an expression "underneath them" that had been explained as rivers flowing underneath the trees in the gardens and the chambers of paradise dwellers.

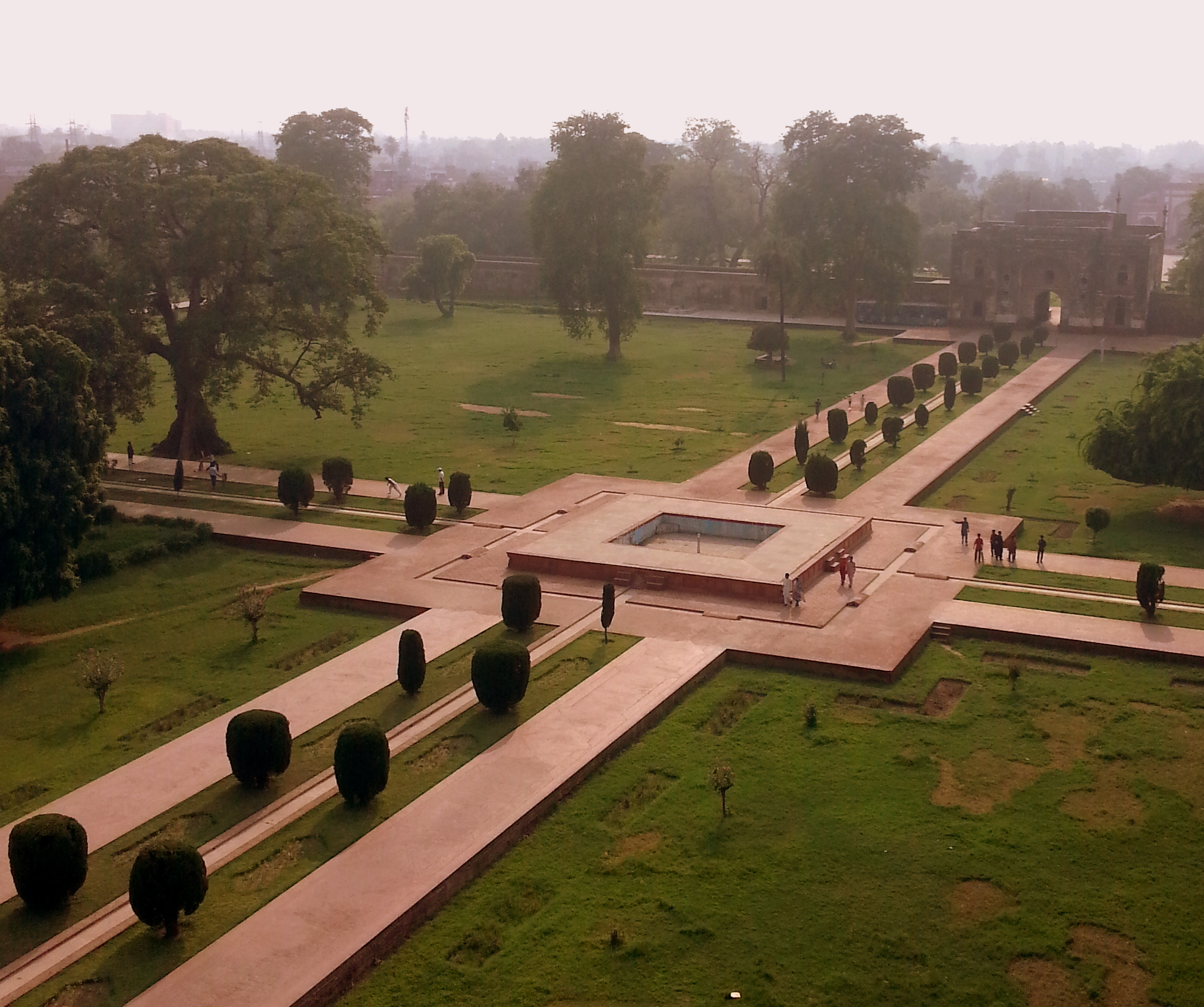
Layout of the Charbagh at the Tomb of Jahangir in Lahore

The four rivers similar to the ones in Genesis can be found in hadiths. A hadith from Muhammad reports that four rivers emerge from heaven: Euphrates, Nile, Sayhān and Jayhān; Hosseinizadeh stresses that the latter two are not necessarily Sayhūn (Syr Daria) and Jayhūn (Amu Daria). In a hadith narrated by Ibn Abbas Tigris is also included into the rivers of Paradise, Sayhān is identified as Indus, Jayhān as Balkh.

In the hadith of Mi'raj Muhammad witnesses four rivers of water, milk, wine and honey flowing from the base of the Sidrat al-Muntaha tree.

Hunt draws parallels between the rivers of Paradise and the Persian Charbagh garden design.

== See also ==
- Fontana dei Quattro Fiumi

== Sources ==
- Kazhdan, Alexander P., ed. (1991). "Paradise, Rivers of". The Oxford Dictionary of Byzantium. Oxford University Press. doi:10.1093/acref/9780195046526.001.0001. ISBN 9780195046526.
- Murray, Peter; Murray, Linda (1998). "Rivers of Paradise, the four". The Oxford Companion to Christian Art and Architecture. Oxford University Press. p. 433. ISBN 978-0-19-860216-3. OCLC 1055176997.
- Cohen, Adam S. (2000). "The Rivers of Paradise". The Uta Codex: Art, Philosophy, and Reform in Eleventh-Century Germany. Penn State Press. pp. 105–108. ISBN 978-0-271-04370-8.
- Speiser, Ephraim Avigdor (1967). "The Rivers of Paradise". In Finkelstein, J. J.; Greenberg, Moshe (eds.). Oriental and Biblical Studies: Collected Writings of E. A. Speiser. Philadelphia: University of Pennsylvania Press. pp. 23–34.
- Hosseinizadeh, Abdol Majid (15 December 2012). "The Four Rivers of Eden in Judaism and Islam". Al-Bayan: Journal of Qur'an and Hadith Studies. 10 (2): 33–47. doi:10.11136/jqh.1210.02.03. eISSN 2232-1969. ISSN 2232-1950.
- Jenkinson, E. J. (April 1929). "The rivers of Paradise". The Muslim World. 19 (2): 151–155. doi:10.1111/j.1478-1913.1929.tb02327.x. eISSN 1478-1913. ISSN 0027-4909.
- Radday, Yehuda T. (1982). "The Four Rivers of Paradise". Hebrew Studies. 23. National Association of Professors of Hebrew: 23–31. JSTOR 27908758.
- El-Zein, Amira (January 2012), "Water of Paradise", Encyclopaedia of the Qurʾān, Brill, doi:10.1163/1875-3922_q3_EQSIM_00453
- Haupt, Paul (1896). "The rivers of Paradise". Proceeeding of the American Oriental Society. 16: cii–cv. JSTOR 592493.
- Emma Clark (1996). Underneath which Rivers Flow: The Symbolism of the Islamic Garden. Prince of Wales's Institute of Architecture. ISBN 978-1-898465-06-5. OCLC 1023956991.
- Grant, Robert M. (1992). "Early Christian Geography". Vigiliae Christianae. 46 (2): 105–111. doi:10.2307/1583784. JSTOR 1583784.
