= Wadi al-Batin =

Coordinates: 29°06′05″N 46°33′19″E

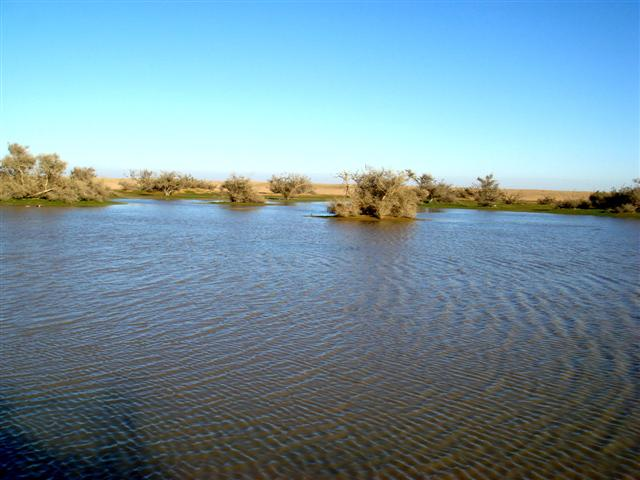

- Location within Saudi Arabia

Location
- Countries: Saudi Arabia, Iraq, Kuwait

Wadi al-Batin (وادي الباطن) is an intermittent river in Saudi Arabia, Iraq, and Kuwait. It is the lowest and final section of Wadi al-Rummah. It runs 45 mi (72 km) in a northeast–southwest direction through the Al-Dibdibah plain and has been recognized since 1913 as the border between Kuwait and Iraq.

== Description ==
The now non-active alluvial fan, extends northeastward from Hafar al-Batin in Saudi Arabia to cover parts of Kuwait and southwestern Iraq. This alluvial fan may have formed the Al-Dibdibah gravel plain. At the river bend ʿAuǧat al-Bāṭin (عوجة الباطن) is the tripoint of Saudi Arabia, Iraq and Kuwait. This was the eastern border point of the Saudi Arabian–Iraqi neutral zone that was divided between the adjoining countries in 1981.

Most of present-day Kuwait is still archaeologically unexplored.

Neolithic and early to late Islamic settlements were discovered on Kuwait's side of Wadi al-Batin. The wadi was the site of the Battle of Wadi al-Batin in 1991.

== Garden of Eden ==
According to some, Kuwait was probably the original location of the Pishon River which some suggest watered the Garden of Eden. Juris Zarins argued that the Garden of Eden was situated at the head of the Persian Gulf (present-day Kuwait), where the Tigris and Euphrates rivers run into the sea, from his research on this area using information from many different sources, including Landsat images from space. His suggestion about the Pishon River was supported by James A. Sauer of the American Center of Oriental Research. Sauer made an argument from geology and history that Pishon River was the now-defunct Kuwait River. With the aid of satellite photos, Farouk El-Baz traced the dry channel from Kuwait up the Wadi al-Batin.

== See also ==
- List of wadis of Saudi Arabia
