= Pishon =

Biblical river

The Pishon (Hebrew: פִּישׁוֹן Pīšōn; Koine Greek: Φισών Phisṓn) is one of four rivers (along with Hiddekel (Tigris), Perath (Euphrates) and Gihon) mentioned in the Biblical Book of Genesis. In that passage, a source river flows out of Eden to water the Garden of Eden and from there divides into the four named rivers. The Pishon is described as encircling "the entire land of Havilah where is gold; bdellium and onyx stone."

== Identification ==
Unlike the Tigris and the Euphrates, the Pishon has never been clearly located. It is briefly mentioned together with the Tigris in the Wisdom of Sirach (24:25/35), but this reference throws no more light on the location of the river. The Jewish–Roman historian Flavius Josephus, in the beginning of his Antiquities of the Jews (1st century AD) identified the Pishon with the Ganges. The medieval French rabbi Rashi identified it with the Nile.

Some early modern scholars such as Antoine Augustin Calmet (1672–1757) and later figures such as Ernst Friedrich Karl Rosenmüller (1768–1835), and Carl Friedrich Keil (1807–1888), believed the source river [for Eden] was a region of springs: "The Pishon and Gihon were mountain streams. The former may have been the Phasis or Araxes, and the latter the Oxus."

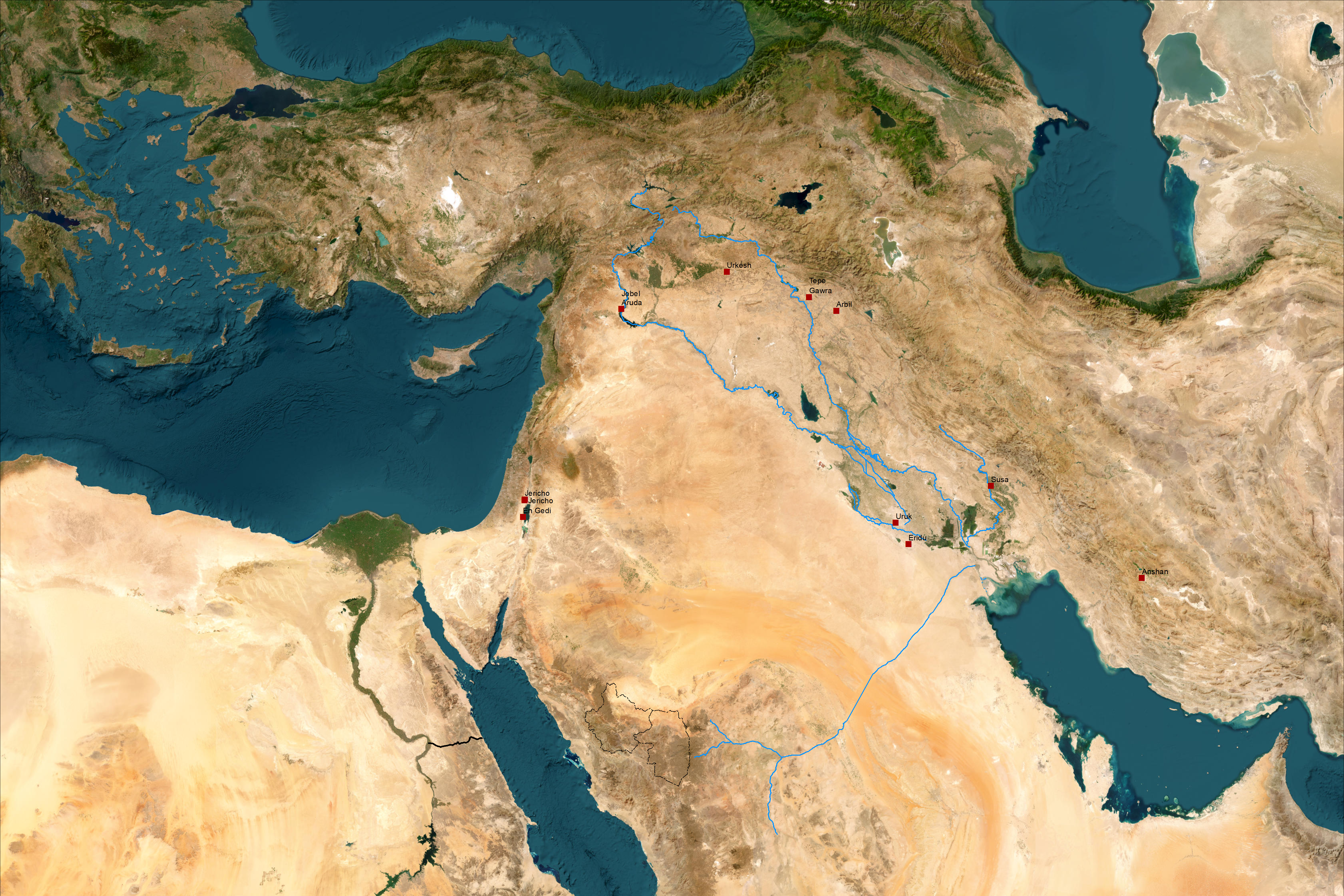
Map highlighting Wadi al-Batin and Wadi al-Rummah

James A. Sauer, former curator of the Harvard Semitic Museum, argued from geology and history that Pishon referred to what is now the Wadi al-Batin, a largely dry channel whose source begins in the Hijaz Mountains near Medina, to run northeast to Kuwait. With the aid of satellite photos, Farouk El-Baz of Boston University traced the dry channel from Kuwait up the Wadi al-Batin and the Wadi al-Rummah system originating near Medina at Jibāl al Abyaḑ.

David Rohl identified Pishon with the Uizhun, placing Havilah to the northeast of Mesopotamia. The Uizhun is known locally as the Golden River. Rising near the stratovolcano Sahand, it meanders between ancient gold mines and lodes of lapis lazuli before feeding the Caspian Sea. Such natural resources correspond to ones associated with the land of Havilah in Genesis.

Dan'el Kahn of the University of Haifa suggested that the name Pishon might come from Egyptian word pA-Shen, meaning the ocean. The Babylonian Map of the World calls the ocean the "bitter river".

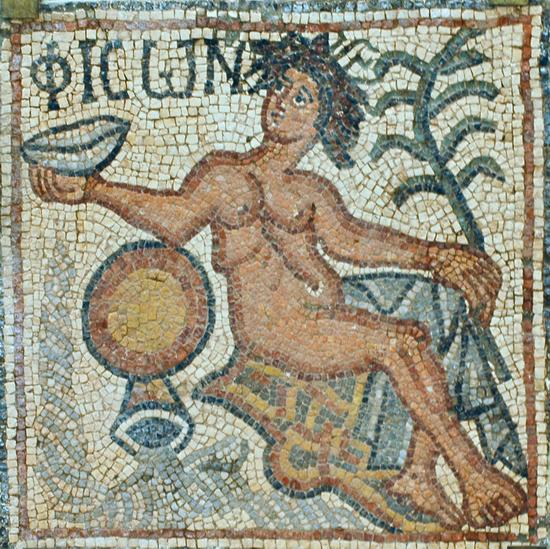
Mosaic representing Pishon from Church of Theodorias (Qasr Libya) c. AD 539

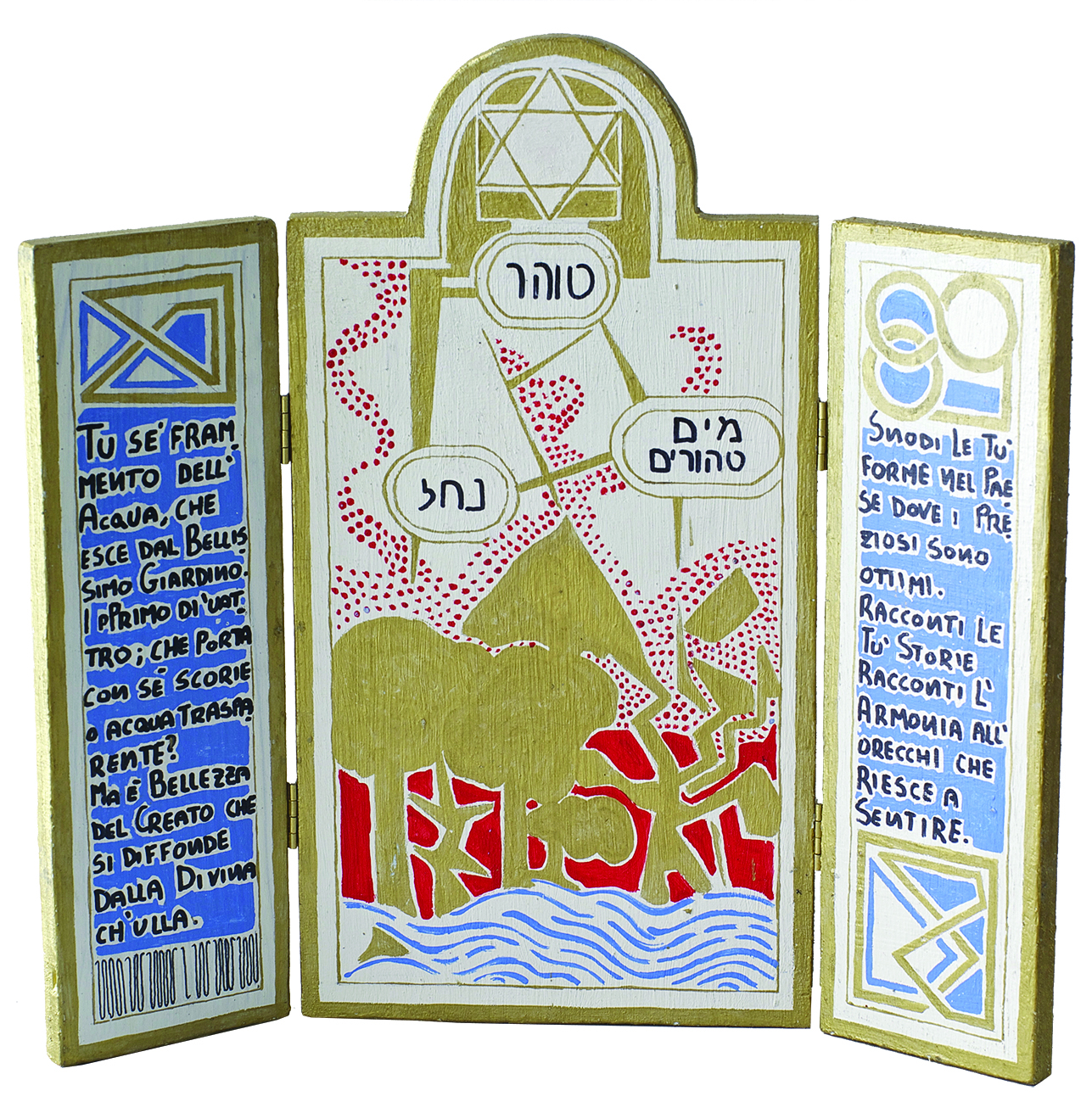
Jewish Golden Books by modern artist Filippo Biagioli, dedicated to the river Pishon
