= Dez Dam =

Dam in Khuzestan (andimeshk ), Iran

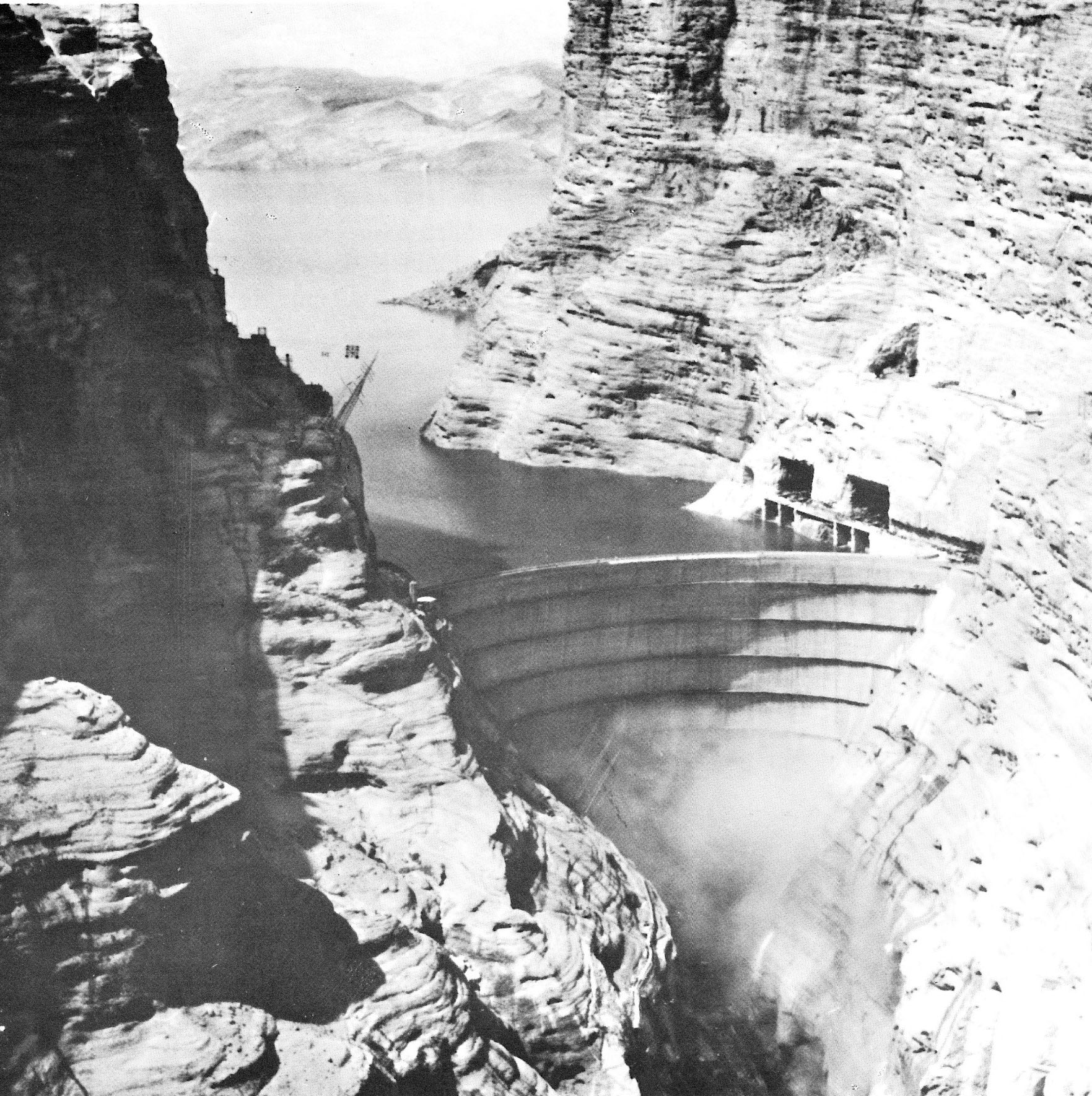

- Location within Iran
- Interactive map of Dez Dam
- Official name: Dez (Persian: دز)
- Country: Iran
- Location: Khuzestan, Andimeshk
- Status: Operational
- Construction began: 1959
- Opening date: 1963
- Owners: Khuzestan Water & Power Authority

Dam and spillways
- Type of dam: Arch dam
- Impounds: Dez River
- Height: 203 m (666 ft)
- Length: 380 m (1,247 ft)
- Width (crest): 27 m (89 ft)
- Dam volume: 3460 MCM
- Spillway capacity: 6,000 m^{3}/s (210,000 cu ft/s)

Reservoir
- Total capacity: 3.34 km^{3} (2,710,000 acre⋅ft)
- Surface area: 64.9 km^{2} (25.1 sq mi)

Power Station
- Commission date: 1962-1970
- Turbines: 8 x 65 MW
- Installed capacity: 520 MW
- Annual generation: 1,783 GWh
- Website dezdam.co.ir

The Dez Dam (Persian: سد دز), formerly known as Mohammad-Reza Shah Pahlavi Dam (Persian: سد محمدرضا شاه پهلوی), before the 1979 Revolution, is an arch dam on the Dez River in the southwestern province of Khuzsetan , Andimeshk . It was built between 1959 and 1963 during the rule of Mohammad Reza Pahlavi, the last Shah of Iran, with contacting an Italian consortium and is owned by the Khuzestan Water & Power Authority. The dam is 203 metres (666 ft) high, making it one of the highest in the country, and has a reservoir capacity of 3,340,000,000 m^{3} (2,710,000 acre⋅ft). At the time of construction the Dez Dam was Iran's biggest development project. The primary purpose of the dam is hydroelectric power production and irrigation. It has an associated 520 MW power station and its reservoir helps irrigate up to 80,500 ha (199,000 acres) of farmland. US$42 million of the cost to construct the dam came from the World Bank.

== Background ==
Impregilo was involved with building the Dez Dam. Plans for the dam were finalized in 1957 and construction began in 1959. In 1962 the first generator was commissioned. In 1963 the dam was complete with two of the eight 65 MW Francis turbine generators commissioned. The remaining six were commissioned by 1970. In the late 1970s the irrigation of the project had reached 80,500 ha (199,000 acres) of its 110,000 ha (270,000 acres) goal.

The dam's current problem is the annual loss of reservoir capacity due to the erosion of soil in upstream areas. By 2006, the reservoir volume was estimated to be 2,600,000,000 m^{3} (2,100,000 acre⋅ft).

== Gallery ==
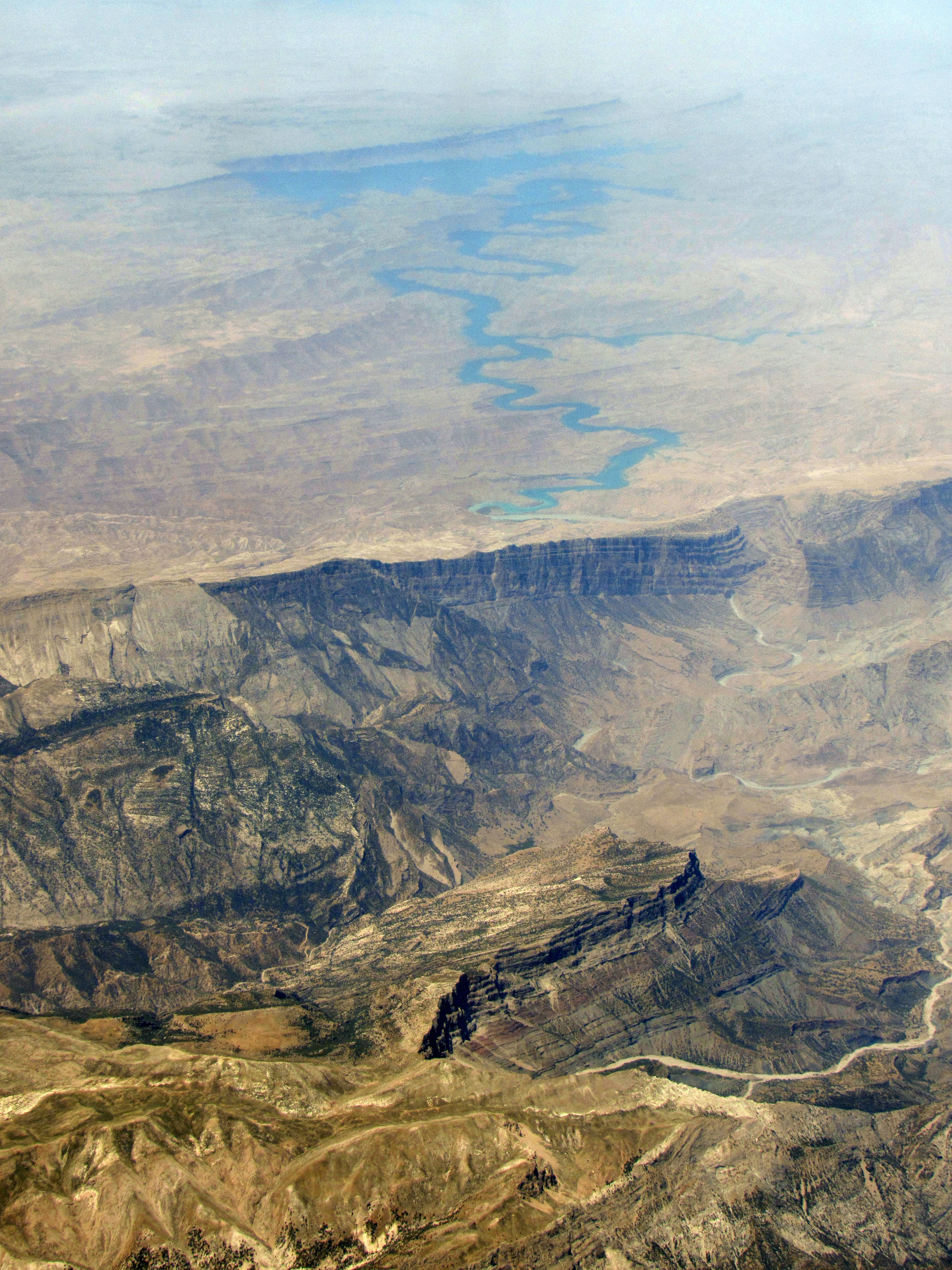
Aerial view of the Dez Reservoir, looking west

== See also ==
- Dams in Iran
