= Shahrak-e Shahid Rajai =

Shahrak-e Shahid Rajai or Shahrak-e Shahid Rejai or Shahrak-e Shahidar Jai (transl. Martyr Rajai town) may refer to the following things named after assassinated Iranian president Mohammad-Ali Rajai:

- Shahrak-e Shahid Rajai, Darab, Fars Province
- Shahrak-e Shahid Rejai, Fasa, Fars Province
- Shahrak-e Shahid Rajai, Hormozgan
- Shahrak-e Shahid Rajai, Ilam
- Shahrak-e Shahidar Jai, Bagh-e Malek, Khuzestan Province
- Shahrak-e Shahid Rajai, Ramhormoz, Khuzestan Province
- Shahrak-e Shahid Rajai, Shush, Khuzestan Province
- Shahrak-e Shahid Rejai, Markazi
- Shahrak-e Shahid Rejai, Mazandaran

== See also ==
- Shahid Rajai (disambiguation)
