= Shahid Rajai =

Shahid Rajai (transl. Martyr Rajai) may refer to the following things named after assassinated (1981 Iranian Prime Minister's office bombing) Iranian president Mohammad-Ali Rajai:

- Eskaleh-ye Shahid Rajai, Hormozgan Province
- Shahid Rajai, Ilam
- Shahid Rajai, Khuzestan
- Shahid Rajai, Kuhdasht, Lorestan Province
- Shahid Rajai, Pol-e Dokhtar, Lorestan Province
- Shahid Rajai construction site, South Khorasan Province
- Shahid Rajaee Dam
- Shahid Rajaei Stadium
- Shahid Rajaee University
- Port of Shahid Rajaee

== See also ==
- Shahrak-e Shahid Rajai (disambiguation)
