= List of dams and reservoirs in Iran =

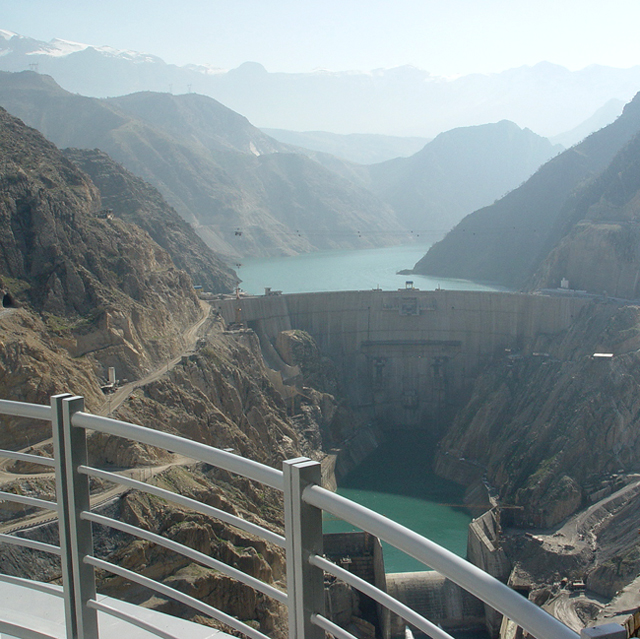
The Karun-3 dam was inaugurated in 2005 as part of a drive to boost Iran's growing energy demand.

Major dam construction started in Iran in the 1950s. Some fourteen large dams were built with the help of foreign engineers and advisors during two decades preceding the Islamic Revolution in 1979.

In the post-revolution era, Iran's dam building capacity was significantly strengthened, with some 200 contracting companies, 70 consultant firms and 30 corporations as well as hundreds of hydroelectric manufacturing units having been established inside of Iran in less than three decades. In addition to the necessity of generating electricity, Iran needs dams to effectively control and manage a growing water shortage across the country.

Iran was constructing 88 small and large dams in 2007. On average, close to two billion cubic meters of water are added to the country's water reserves annually. As of 2010, Iran has constructed 588 dams (big and small), with 137 more under construction and 546 planned.

== Main reservoirs and dams in Iran ==
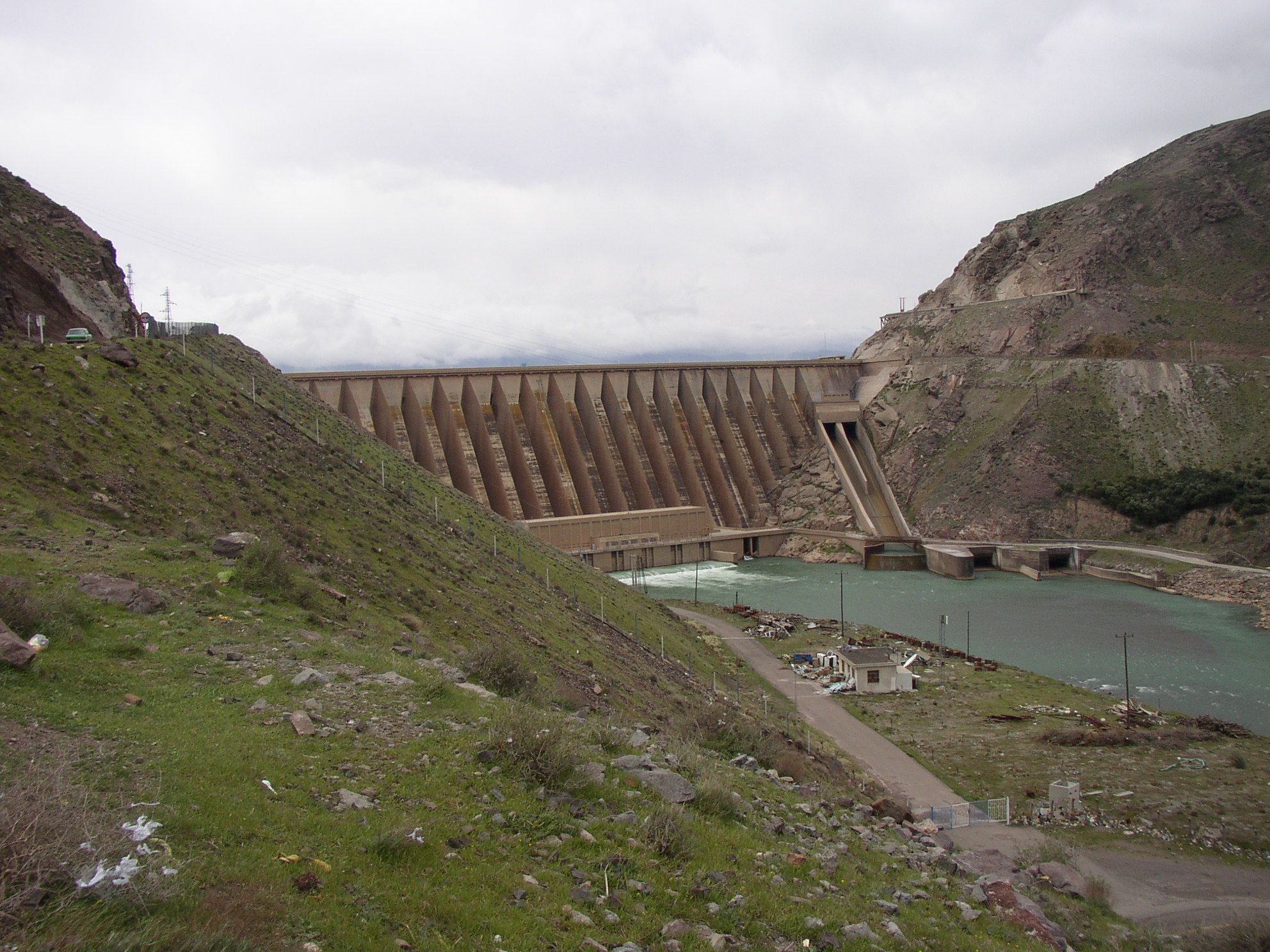
Sefidrud Dam, formerly Manjil Dam)

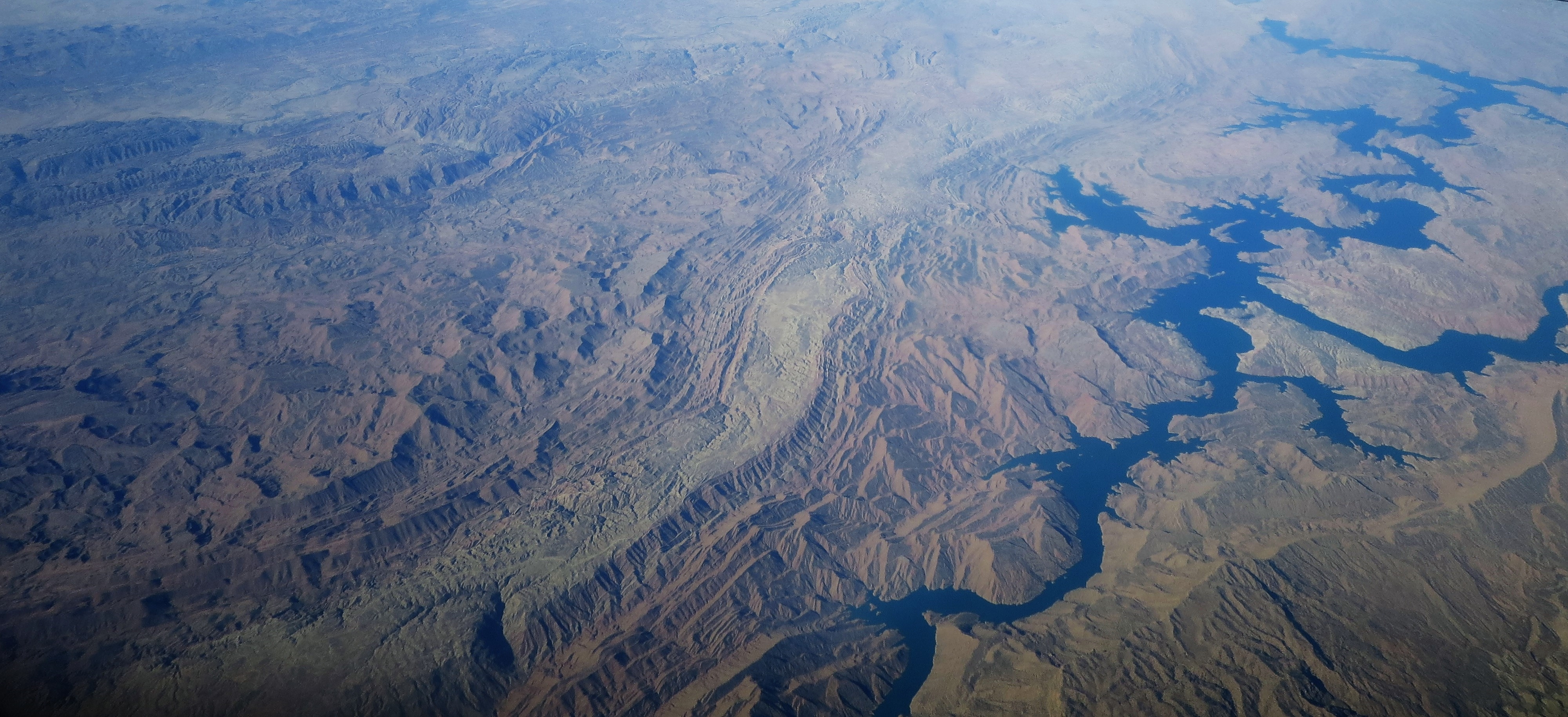
Dammed portion of Karun River near Masjed Soleyman

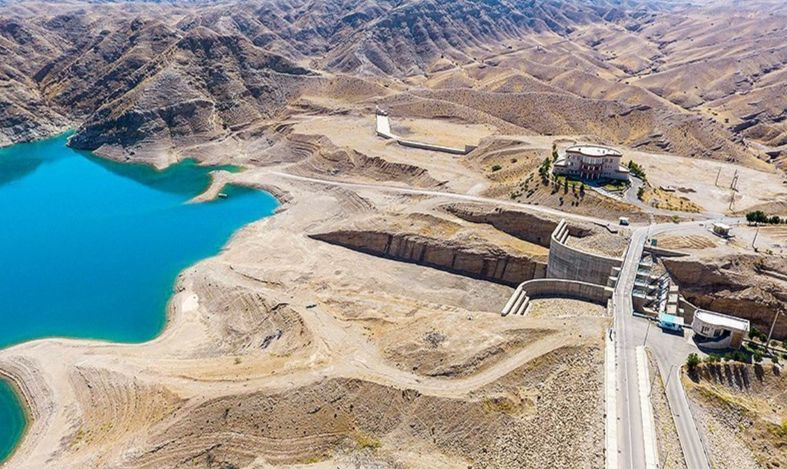
Jarreh Dam near Ramhormoz

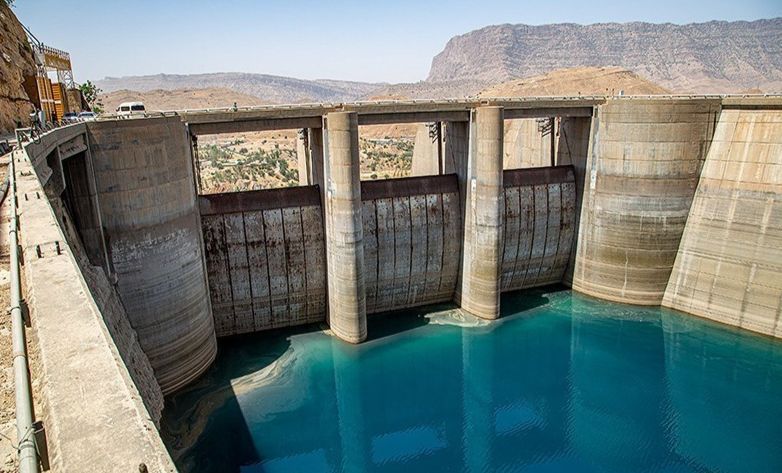
Shahid Abbaspour Dam

- Alavian Dam
- Alqadir Dam
- Amir Kabir Dam
- Ashavan Dam
- Aydughmush Dam
- Azad Dam
- Daryan Dam
- Dez Dam
- Doroodzan Dam
- Garan Dam
- Gavoshan Dam
- Givi Dam
- Ilam Dam
- Iran–Turkmenistan Friendship Dam
- Jegin Dam
- Jiroft dam
- Kalghan Dam
- Karkheh dam
- Karun-1 (Shahid Abbaspour) Dam
- Karun-2 (Masjed Soleyman) Dam
- Karun-3 Dam
- Karun-4 Dam
- Khoda Afarin Dam
- Kouhrang 1 Dam
- Kouhrang 2 Dam
- Lar Dam
- Latyan Dam
- Mahabad Dam
- Mamloo Dam
- Marun Dam
- Nader Shah Dam
- Panzadh Khordad Dam
- Rudbar Lorestan Dam
- Sahand Dam
- Sardasht Dam
- Sefidrud (Manjil) Dam
- Seimare Dam
- Shahid Rajaee (Soleyman Tangeh) Dam
- Shirvan Dam
- Siah Bishe Dams
- Silveh Dam
- Sivand Dam
- Sumbar Dam
- Taleqan Dam
- Talvar Dam
- Tarik Dam
- Upper Gotvand Dam
- Zarrine River (Bukan) Dam
- Zayandeh River Dam

=== Under construction ===
- Aras Watershed (Meghri) Dam
- Bakhtiari Dam
- Balvabin Dam
- Khersan-3 Dam
- Kouhrang 3 Dam
- Marash Dam
- Moshampa Dam

== Ancient dams ==
- Band-e Kaisar
- Boz Dam
- The Great Hagi Jaffar Dam
- Jaber Dam
- Jawid Dam
- Kebar Dam
- Kurit Dam
- Shahi Dam

== International projects ==
One of Iran's most important international projects will see the construction of a $200 million hydroelectric dam in Nicaragua, starting in 2011. Iran is currently engaged in dam construction in Tajikistan, Armenia and Azerbaijan, and consultations are under way with a number of other countries. Kenya, Sri Lanka, Bolivia and Mali are the potential target markets being considered for exporting the country's technical and engineering services. In 2010, Iran won a contract to build a dam in Afghanistan and the third contract to build a power plant station in Syria.

== See also ==
- Irrigation in Iran
- Industrial Development and Renovation Organization of Iran
- International rankings of Iran
- List of power stations in Iran
- Water supply and sanitation in Iran
- Water scarcity in Iran
