= Gavshan Dam =

Dam in Kurdistan, Iran

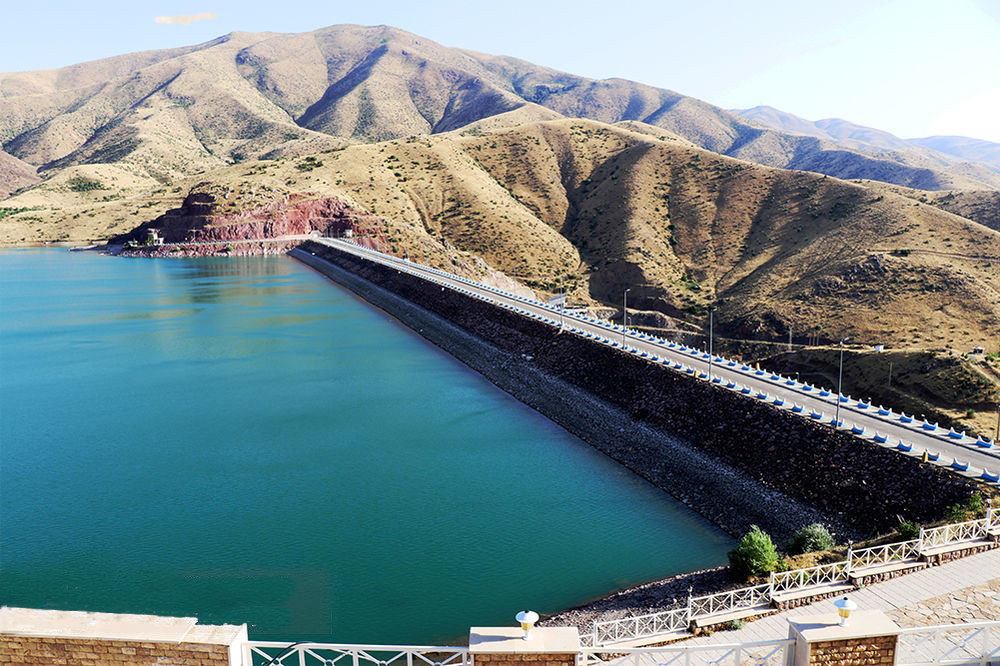
- Interactive map of Gavshan Dam
- Official name: سد گاوشان
- Country: Iran
- Location: kamyaran
- Status: Operational
- Construction began: 1992
- Opening date: 2004
- Owners: Iran Water and Power Resources Development Co

Dam and spillways
- Type of dam: Embankment, rock-fill
- Height: 123 m (404 ft)
- Length: 620 m (2,034 ft)
- Elevation at crest: 1,551 m (5,089 ft)
- Dam volume: 10,000,000 m^{3} (13,079,506 cu yd)
- Spillway type: Side Channel Spillway

Reservoir
- Creates: Gavshan Reservoir
- Total capacity: 550,000,000 m^{3} (445,892 acre⋅ft)

Power Station
- Installed capacity: 2 x 5.5 MW Francis-type

Gavshan Dam (Persian: سد گاوشان) is an embankment dam on the Gaveh River 40 km (25 mi) south of Sanandaj in Kurdistan province, Iran. It was created for the primary purpose of irrigation but also supports an 11 MW hydroelectric power station. Water from the dam's reservoir is transferred for irrigation in Kurdistan and Kermanshah provinces via 20 km (12 mi) Gavshan Water Conveyance Tunnel. About 189,000,000 m^{3} (153,225 acre⋅ft) can be transferred annually for the irrigation of 310 km^{2} (120 sq mi). Additionally, water from the reservoir is used to provide drinking water for the city of Kermanshah in the amount of 63,000,000 m^{3} (51,075 acre⋅ft) annually. Construction on the dam began in 1992 and was completed in 2004. It was inaugurated by Iran's President Mohammad Khatami on 13 February 2005.

== See also ==
- List of power stations in Iran
- Dams in Iran
