= Azad Dam =

Dam in Kordestan, Iran

- Location within Iran
- Interactive map of Azad Dam
- Country: Iran
- Location: Sanandaj
- Opening date: 2018

Dam and spillways
- Impounds: Gura River
- Height: 115 m (377 ft)
- Length: 595 m (1,952 ft)
- Width (crest): 15 m (49 ft)
- Dam volume: 8,500,000 m^{3} (11,117,580 cu yd)

Reservoir
- Total capacity: 260,000,000 m^{3} (210,000 acre⋅ft)

Power Station
- Commission date: 2018
- Turbines: 3 x 3.3 MW (4,400 hp) Francis-type, 3 x 166.3 MW (223,000 hp) reversible Francis
- Installed capacity: Conventional max. planned: 10 MW (13,000 hp); Pumped storage max. planned: 500 MW
- Annual generation: 95 GWh (340 TJ)

Azad Dam (Persian: سد آزاد) is an embankment dam on the Gura River, 40 km (25 mi) west of Sanandaj in Kordestan province, Iran. It is situated in Kurdistan Province and its construction is part of a water management plan for Kurdistan Province. It has an installed electricity generating capacity of 10 MW (13,000 hp) and future pumped storage power plant with a regenerating capacity of 500 MW (670,000 hp).

The pumped storage power plant is to be connected to the dam via a 1,600 metres (5,200 ft) tunnel of which 110 metres (360 ft) was built by June 2010. The dam with a length of 595 metres (1,952 ft) and a height of 115 metres (377 ft), has a maximum storage capacity of 260,000,000 m^{3} (210,000 acre⋅ft) of water. A 175 kilometres (109 mi) canal connecting the dam with towns of Qarveh and Dehlegan will annually supply over 0.25 cubic kilometres (200,000 acre⋅ft) of water for agricultural purposes to these towns. As the water table of these towns have gone down by over 18 metres (59 ft) due to the excessive use of underground water for crop cultivation, the construction of this dam will help to conserve the underground water sources of the area. One village had to be relocated due to construction of the dam and another new village has been built near the body of the dam. It is estimated that Azad dam will yearly produce approximately 95 GWh of electricity. The dam was operational in 2018.

== See also ==
- List of power stations in Iran
- Dams in Iran
