= Rudbar Lorestan Dam =

Dam in Lorestan, Iran

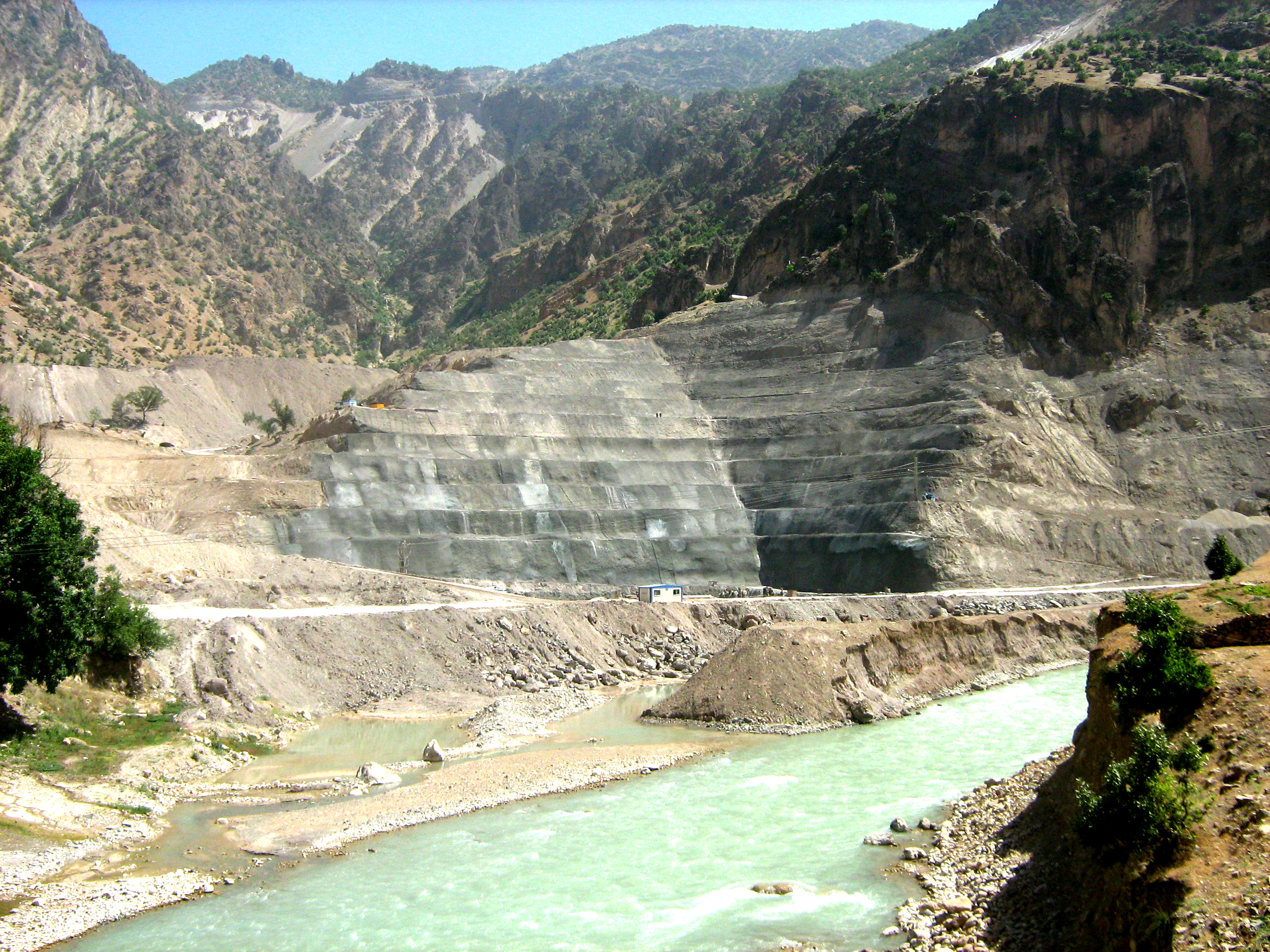

- Location within Iran
- Interactive map of Rudbar Lorestan Dam
- Country: Iran
- Purpose: Power
- Status: operational
- Construction began: 2003
- Opening date: 2016

Dam and spillways
- Type of dam: Gravity, roller-compacted concrete
- Impounds: Rudbar River
- Height (foundation): 155 m (509 ft)
- Height (thalweg): 158 m (518 ft)
- Length: 185 m (607 ft)
- Elevation at crest: 1,765 m (5,791 ft)
- Width (crest): 15 m (49 ft)
- Dam volume: 4,596,000 m^{3} (6,011,341 cu yd)
- Spillways: 2
- Spillway type: Tunnel with flip-buckets
- Spillway capacity: 3,342 m^{3}/s (118,022 cu ft/s)

Reservoir
- Total capacity: 228,000,000 m^{3} (184,843 acre⋅ft)
- Active capacity: 124,000,000 m^{3} (100,528 acre⋅ft)
- Surface area: 4.11 km^{2} (2 mi^{2})
- Maximum length: 20 km (12 mi)
- Maximum width: 20 m (66 ft)

Power Station
- Commission date: 2017
- Turbines: 2 x 225 MW Francis-type
- Installed capacity: 450 MW
- Annual generation: 986 GWh (est.)

Rudbar Lorestan Dam (Persian: سد رودبار لرستان) is a hydroelectric dam on the Rudbar River, a tributary of the Dez River, in Iran's Lorestan province with an installed electricity generating capability of 450 MW. It was scheduled to become operational in 2013. Finally, the dam was completed on 15 September 2016. The hydroelectric plant consisting of two 225-MW vertical Francis turbine-generator units has begun operating on 31 May 2017.

The Hydropower Plant project was undertaken by the Chinese Gezhouba Group as its first international project in Iran under a comprehensive management framework. Approximately 50% of the total project cost was attributed to electromechanical equipment and metal structures manufactured in China, while around 80% of the design adopted Chinese technical standards.

== Location ==
The plant is situated along the main stream of the Rudbar River in a geologically complex region of the Zagros mountain range. The area is characterized by high seismic activity and multiple geological fault zones.

== Construction ==
The project entered the implementation stage in March 2008 following initial design coordination meetings. Construction officially commenced in April 2011 under a contract period of 52 months.

In September 2016, the dam structure was completed and reservoir impoundment began. The first generating unit was connected to the grid on 18 March 2017, followed by the second unit on 25 May 2017, marking full completion of the project approximately three months ahead of schedule. In 2015, the project received Iran's "National Excellent Project Management Award".

In September 2016, more than 300 attendees—including Iranian Minister of Energy Hamid Chitchian and Liu Canxue, Assistant General Manager of China Gezhouba Group, as well as government officials and industry representatives from both sides—were present at the completion ceremony. In his remarks, Chitchian expressed his appreciation to Chinese enterprises for assisting Iran in constructing a project of such high standards.

== Technical specifications ==
The Rudbar project is a diversion-type hydropower station consisting of a concrete gravity dam, spillway, headrace tunnels, and a surface powerhouse.

The installed capacity is 450 MW, with two 225 MW Francis turbine units operating under a design head of 430.7 m. The project includes two pressure steel pipelines with a total length of approximately 4.6 km and a maximum diameter of 4.4 m, among the longest of their kind in hydropower applications.

The plant is equipped with Chinese-developed digital governors and excitation systems, achieving a frequency regulation accuracy of ±0.1 Hz. Gas-insulated switchgear (GIS) is installed to enable fully enclosed power transmission.

== Operation ==
The plant entered commercial operation in August 2017. Following commissioning, operation and maintenance were entrusted to China Gezhouba Group for an initial period of three years under a joint China–Iran operational model.

== Impact ==
During construction, the project created approximately 2,000 local jobs. The plant generates around 1 billion kWh annually and accounts for approximately 4% of Iran's total hydropower capacity. It is estimated to reduce carbon dioxide emissions by 626,000 tonnes per year, contributing to improved energy supply, reduced reliance on fossil fuels, and environmental protection.

== See also ==
- List of power stations in Iran
- Dams in Iran
- China–Iran relations
- Belt and Road Initiative
