= Mamloo Dam =

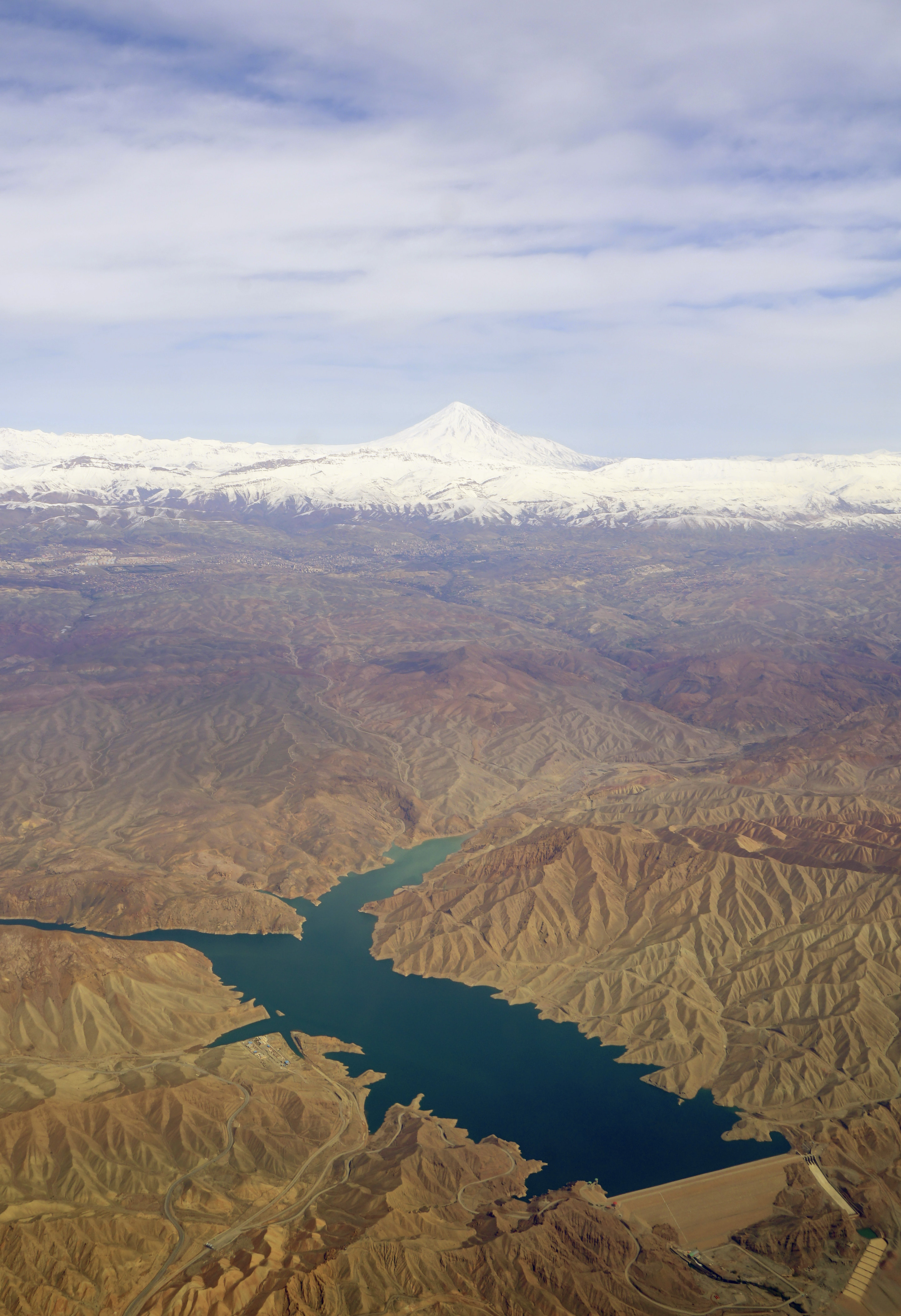
- A view of Mamloo dam and Mount Damavand

- Location within Iran
- Interactive map of Mamloo Dam
- Country: Iran
- Owner: Tehran Regional Water Authority

Dam and spillways
- Length: 807 m (2,648 ft)
- Width (crest): 10 m (33 ft)
- Width (base): 465 m (1,526 ft)

Reservoir
- Total capacity: 250,000,000 m^{3} (202,678 acre⋅ft)
- Active capacity: 222,000,000 m^{3} (179,978 acre⋅ft)
- Inactive capacity: 28,000,000 m^{3} (22,700 acre⋅ft)
- Website https://thrw.ir/st/83

Mamloo Dam (Persian: سد ماملو), is a dam in the Central Alborz mountain range of northern Iran near to the Mount Damavand.The reservoir created by the dam has a capacity of about 250 million cubic meters and It has been built to meet the needs of agricultural water in Varamin plain, but due to the drinking water supply in Tehran, a limited amount of stored water is supplied to the plain. One of the most important effects of the insufficient supply of surface water in Varamin plain is the reduction of groundwater aquifers and land subsidence

It is located 35 kilometres (22 mi) east of Tehran and 49 kilometres (30 mi) southeast of Mount Damavand.

== See also ==
- Dams in Iran
