= Sumbar Dam =

Dam in Iran

- Interactive map of Sumbar Dam
- Country: Iran
- Location: Gholaman, North Khorasan province
- Purpose: Flood control, municipal, irrigation water
- Status: Operational

Dam and spillways
- Type of dam: Embankment, rock-fill
- Height: 23 m (75 ft)
- Length: 900 m (3,000 ft)
- Elevation at crest: 1,342 m (4,403 ft)

Reservoir
- Total capacity: 16,200,000 m^{3} (13,100 acre⋅ft)

The Sumbar Dam (Persian: سد سومبار) is a rock-fill embankment dam just east of Gholaman in North Khorasan province, Iran. The primary purpose of the dam is flood control and water supply for irrigation and municipal uses.

== See also ==
- List of dams and reservoirs in Iran
