= Shahid Abbaspour Dam =

Shahid Abbaspour Dam (Karun-1 Dam)
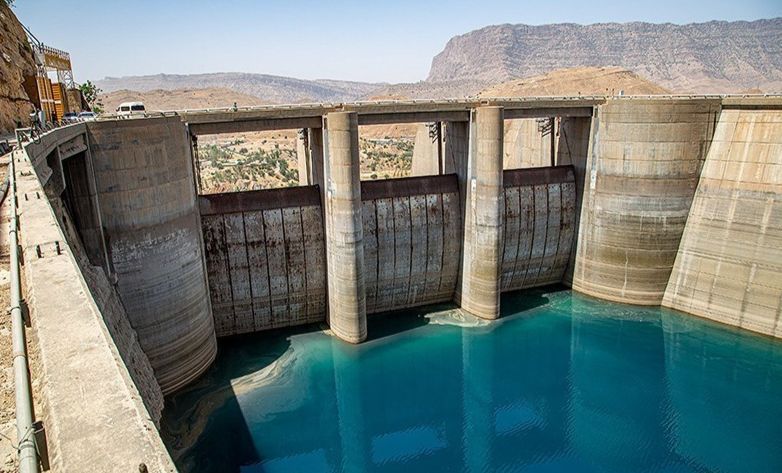
- Interactive map of Shahid Abbaspour Dam (Karun-1 Dam)
- Location: Khuzestan, Iran
- Status: Operational
- Opening date: 1976
- Owners: Water and Power Organization of Khuzestan
- Operator: IWPRDC

Dam and spillways
- Type of dam: Arch dam
- Impounds: Karun River
- Height: 200 m (660 ft)
- Length: 380 m (1,250 ft)

Reservoir
- Total capacity: 3.139 km^{3} (2,545,000 acre⋅ft)
- Surface area: 54.8 km^{2} (21.2 sq mi)

Power Station
- Commission date: 1976 - 2006
- Turbines: 8 × 250 MW (340,000 hp) Francis-type
- Installed capacity: 2,000 MW (2,700,000 hp)
- Website https://kwpa.ir/

The Shahid Abbaspour Dam (Persian: سد شهید عباسپور), formerly known as Great Reza Shah Kabir Dam (Persian: سد رضاشاه کبیر) before the 1979 Revolution, is a large arch dam providing hydroelectricity from the Karun River; it is located about 50 kilometres (31 mi) northeast of Masjed Soleiman, in the province of Khuzestan, Iran, and originally completed in 1976. The dam was the first of a series of dams planned for development on the Karun River.

The dam is a double-curvature concrete arch dam, 200 metres (660 ft) high from the foundation rock. Its crest width is 6 metres (20 ft). The arch dam design was chosen for the narrow, rocky gorge where it is located. The double-curvature arch design withstands the pressure created by the reservoir with a minimum of concrete, because the shape transmits the force of the reservoir downward and laterally, against the rock foundation; this has the effect of strengthening the dam concrete and its foundation by keeping it in compression.

The dam site houses two power stations, one built in 1976 and another built in 1995. Each contains four water turbines connected to electric generators of 250 megawatts (340,000 hp), for a combined generating capacity of 2,000 megawatts (2,700,000 hp). The dam's electrical output is connected to the national electrical grid, with most generation occurring during periods of peak demand for electricity.

== See also ==
- Dams in Iran
