= Sahand Dam =

Dam in East Azerbaijan, Iran

- Location within Iran
- Interactive map of Sahand Dam
- Country: Iran
- Owner: Regional Water Company of East Azarbaijan

Sahand Dam (Persian: سد سهند) is a dam southwest of Hashtrud, East Azerbaijan province, Iran. With a reservoir volume of 135 million cubic meters (4.8×10^{9} cu ft), it is considered one of the most important dams in East Azerbaijan province. In addition to supplying drinking and industrial water to Hashtrud city, this dam supplies agricultural water to about 7 thousand hectares of land in this region.

== See also ==
- Dams in Iran
