= Taleqan Dam =

Hydroelectric dam in Alborz province, Iran

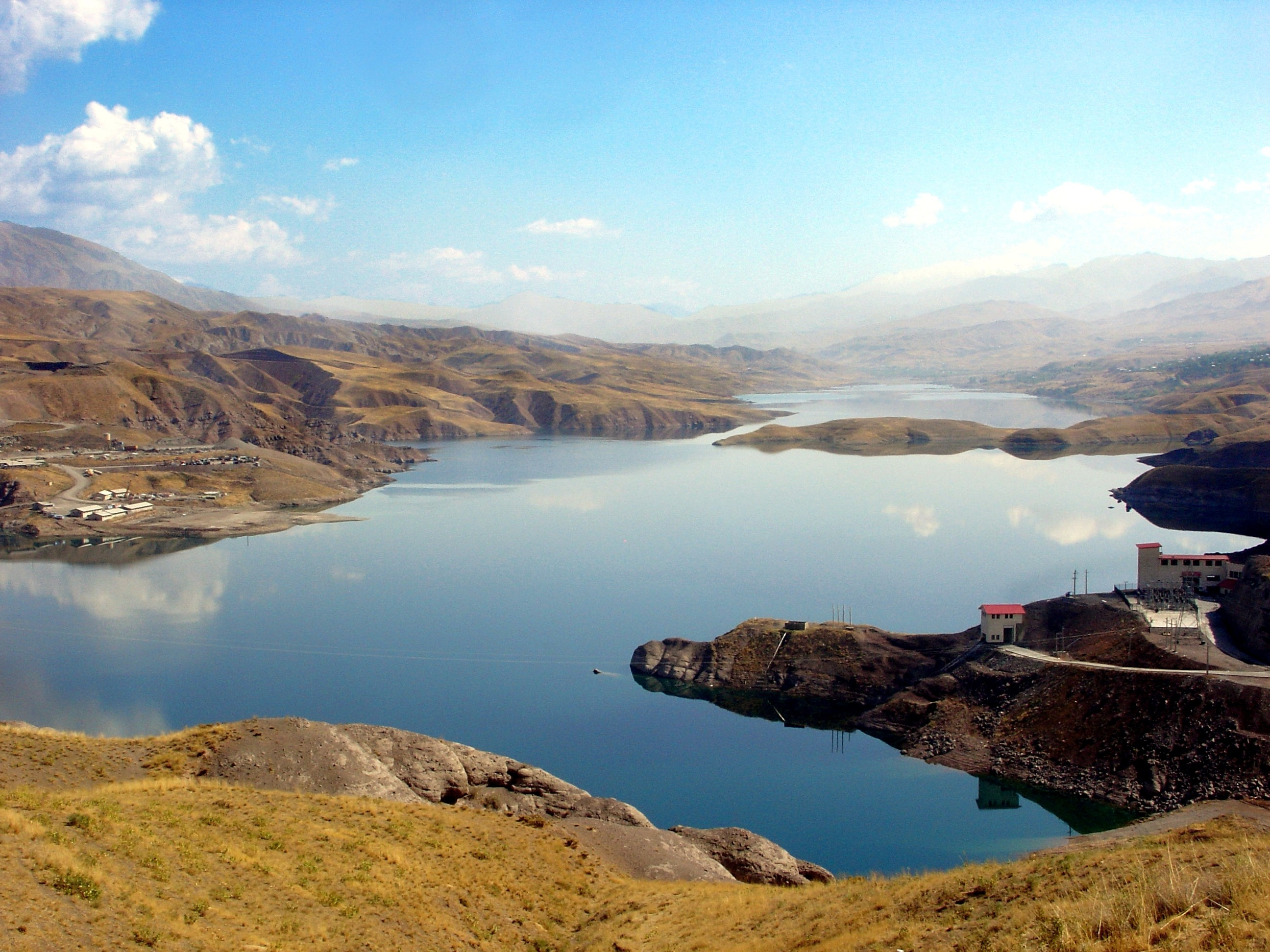
- Taleqan lake
- Interactive map of Taleqan Dam
- Country: Iran
- Location: Taleqan
- Status: Operational
- Construction began: 2002
- Opening date: 2006
- Owner: Regional Water Company of Tehran

Dam and spillways
- Impounds: Taleqan river
- Height: 109 m (358 ft)
- Length: 111 m (364 ft)
- Width (crest): 12 m (39 ft)
- Width (base): 638 m (2,093 ft)
- Spillway type: Side Channel Spillway
- Spillway capacity: 2,040 m^{3}/s (72,000 cu ft/s)
- Website https://thrw.ir/st/78

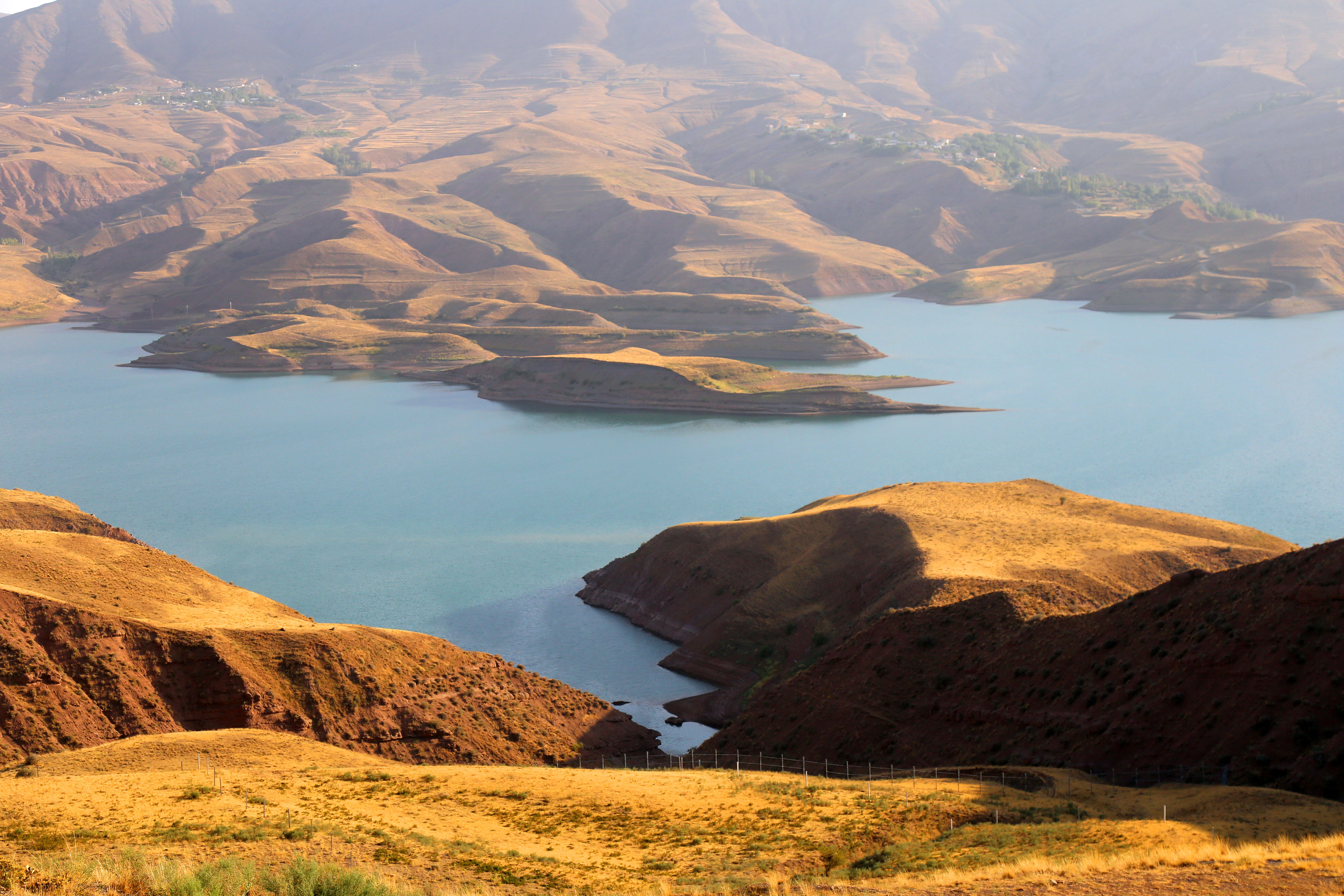
Taleqan Dam Lake

Taleqan Dam (Persian: سد طالقان), also Talaqan Dam, is a hydroelectric dam in Iran with an installed electricity generating capability of 18 MW. It is one of the five main water sources for the Tehran metropolitan. it is situated in Alborz Province. downstream of Alborz province and incorporates a pipe line to Hashtgerd.

It was constructed between 2002 and 2006 on the Shahrud and Taleghan Rivers creating the Taleghan reservoir. The dam can hold 420 million cubic meters of water.

== See also ==
- List of power stations in Iran
- List of dams and reservoirs in Iran

== Gallery ==
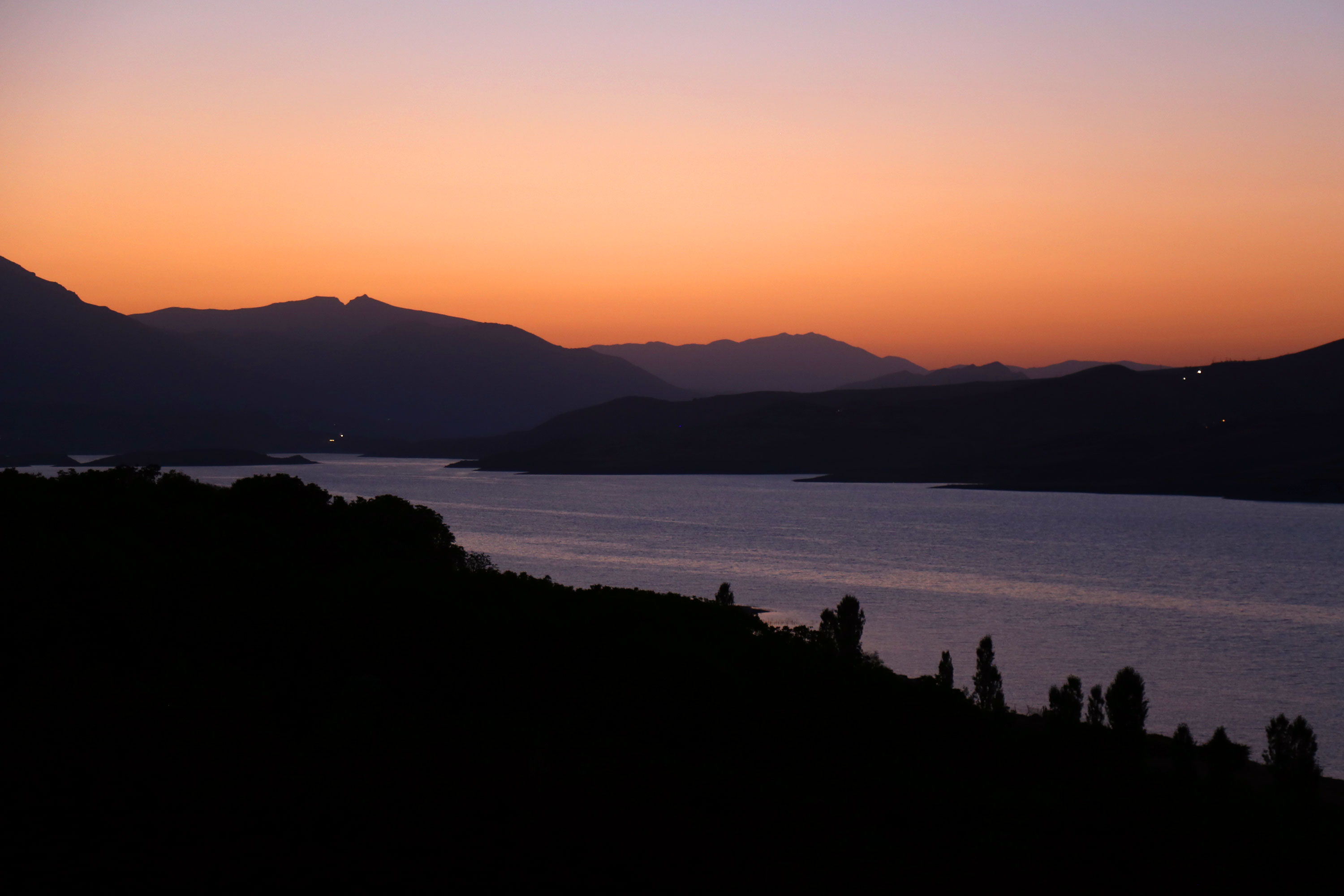
Taleqan Dam Lake

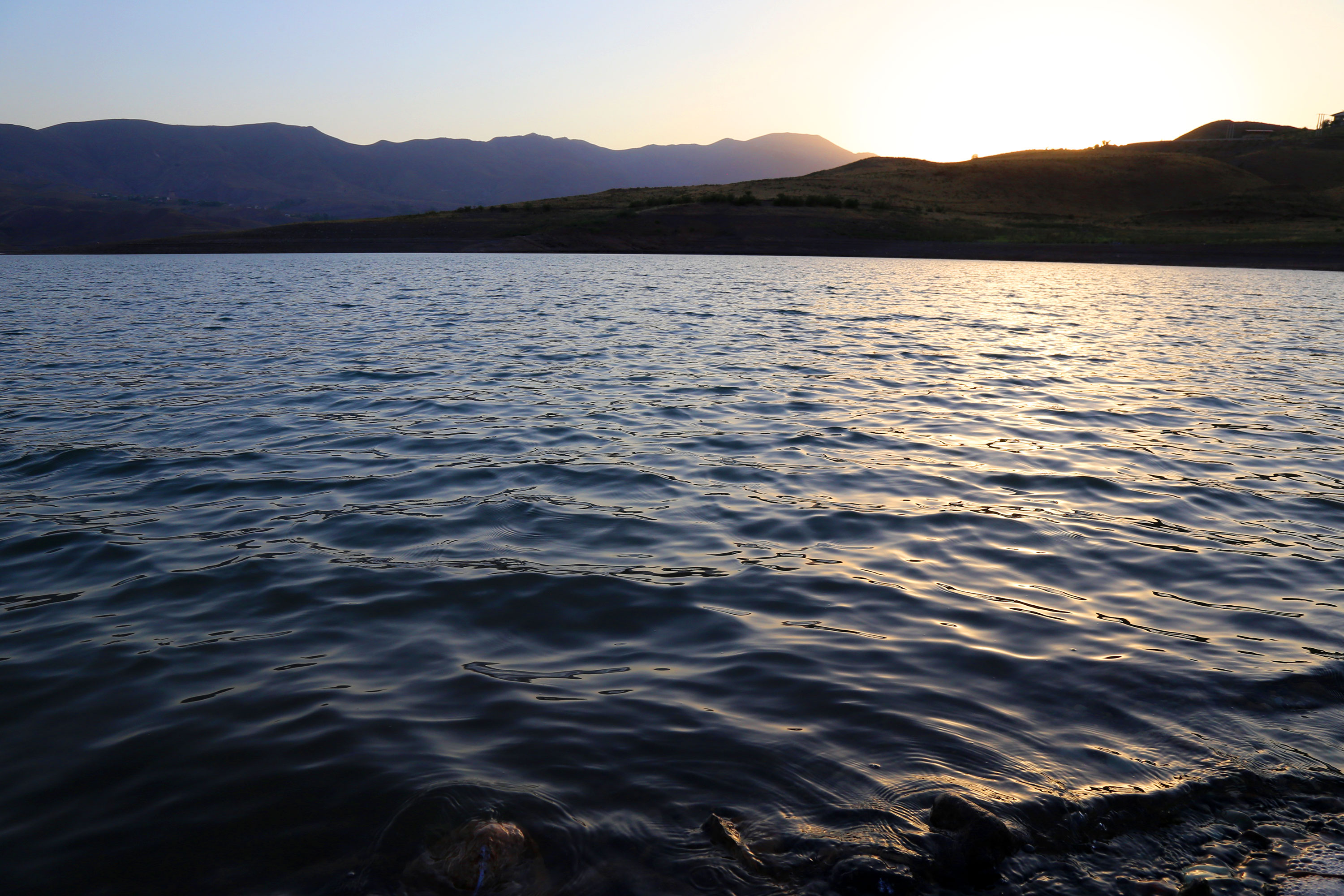
Taleqan Dam Lake

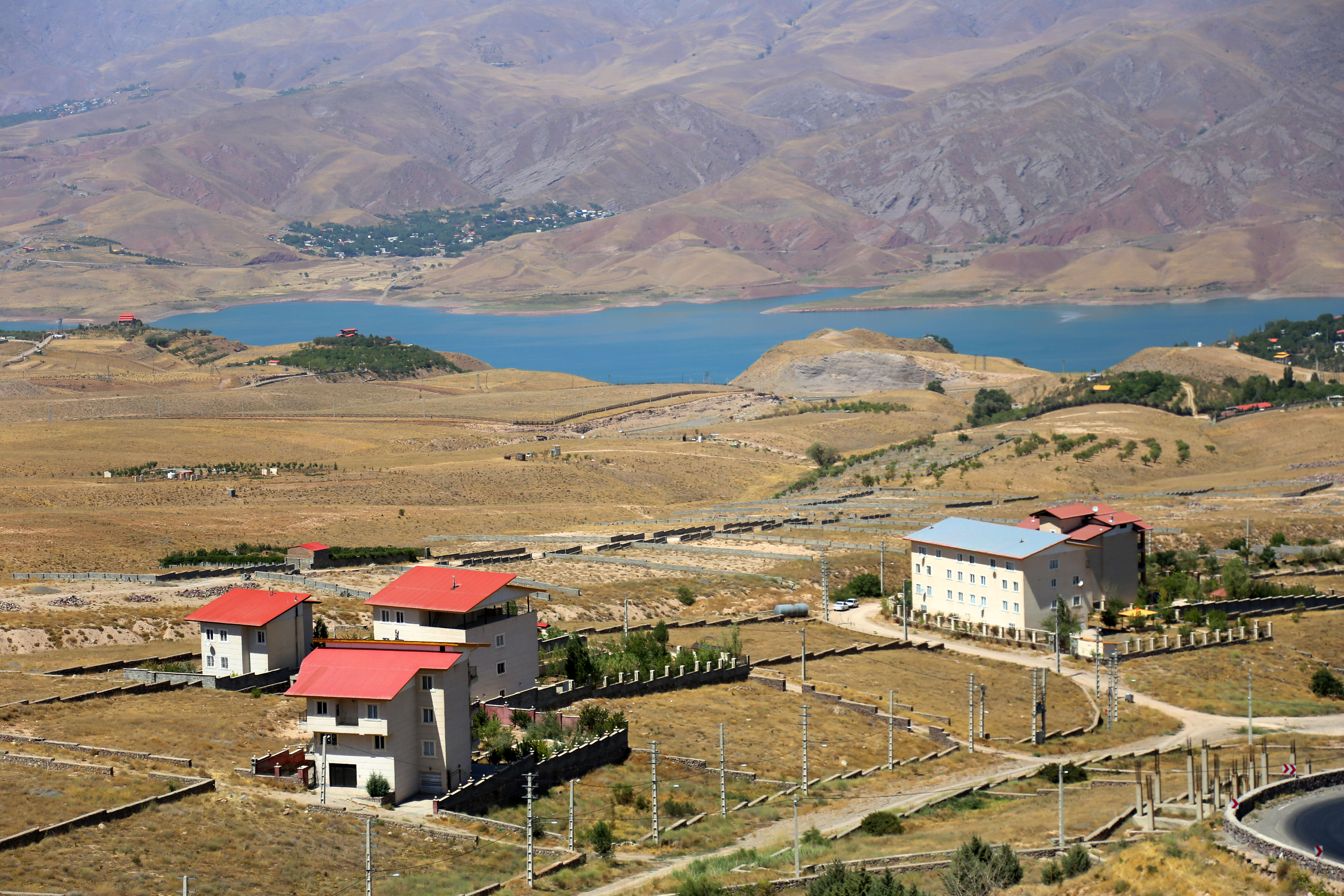
Taleqan Dam, Iran

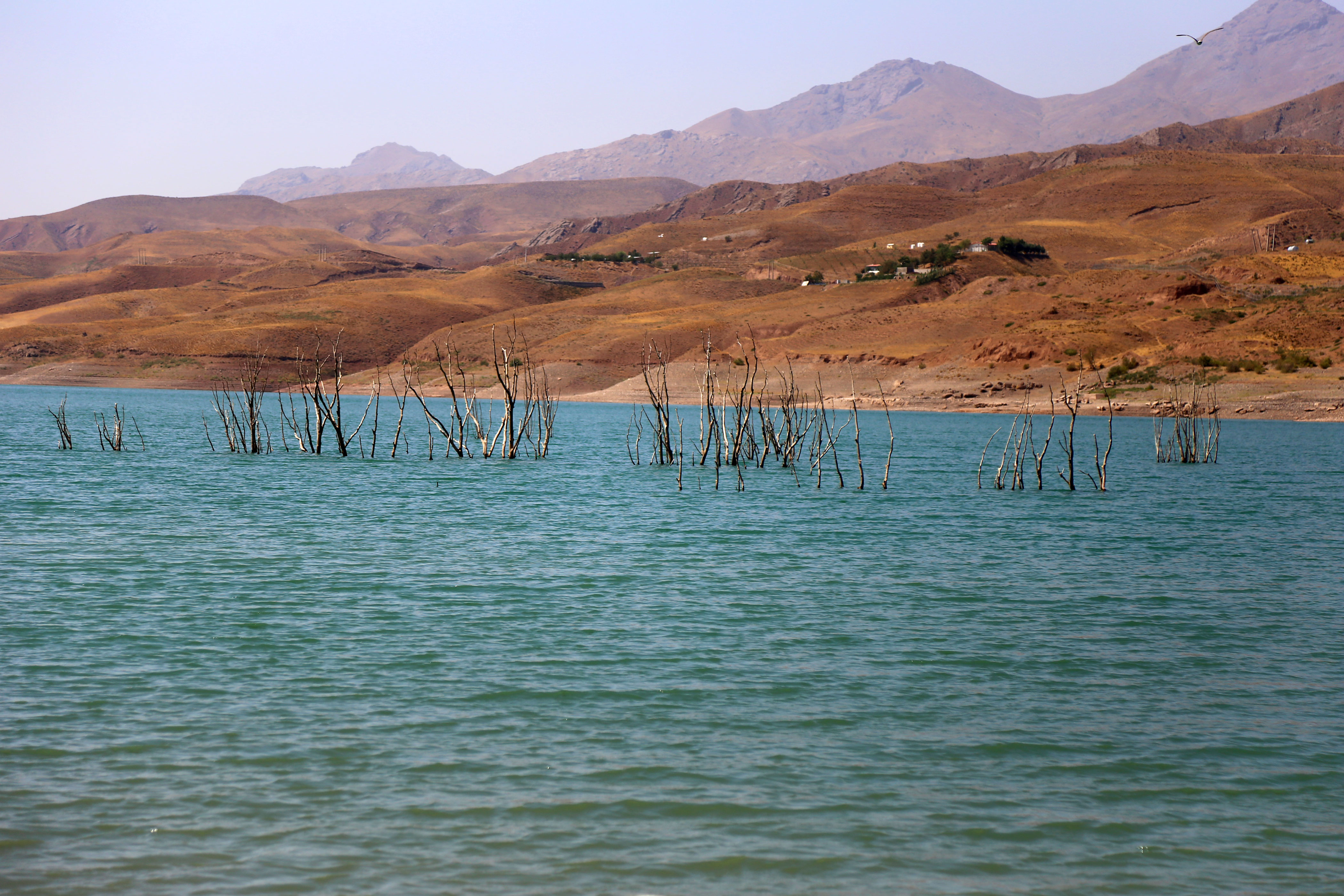
Taleqan Dam, Iran

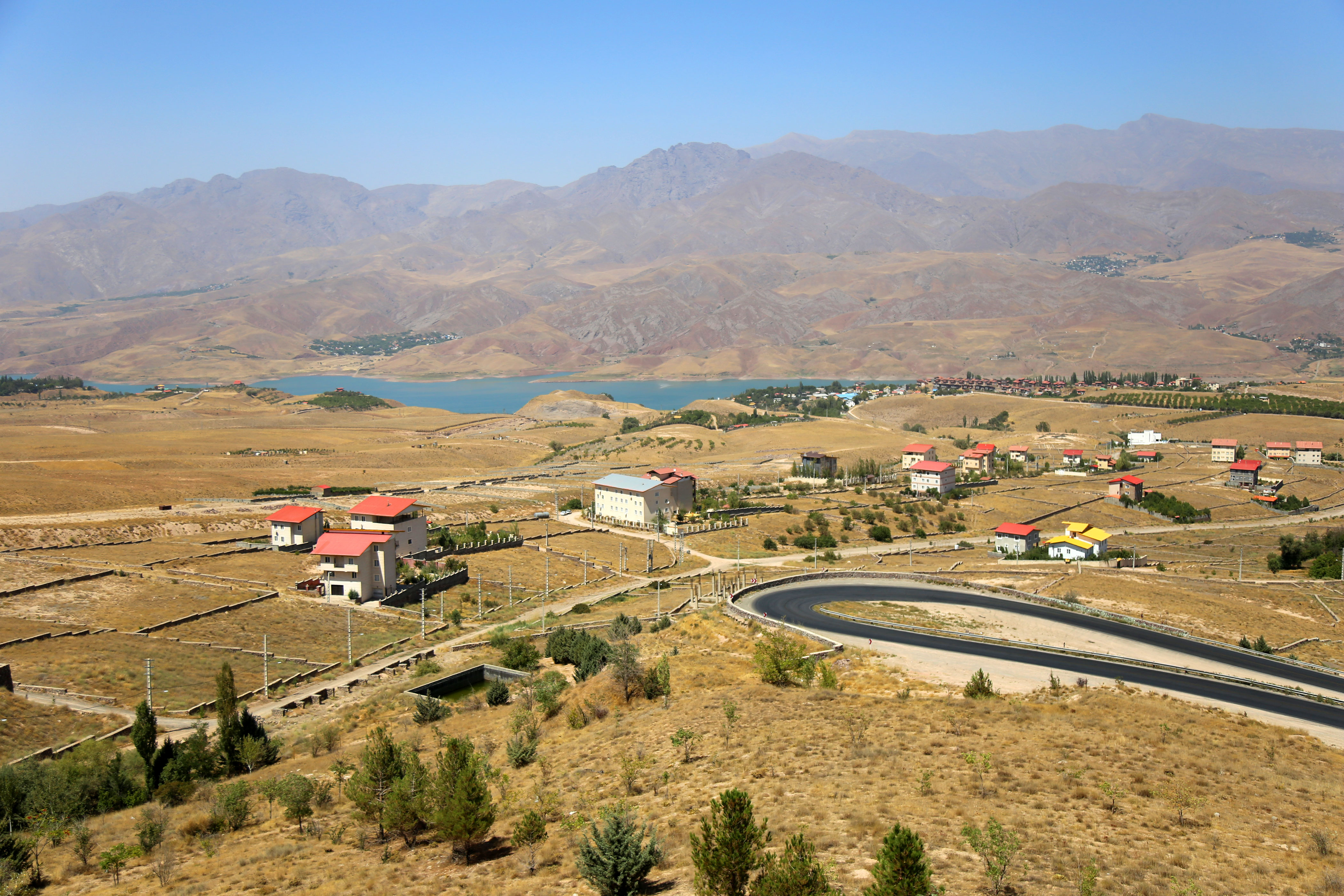
Taleqan Dam, Iran

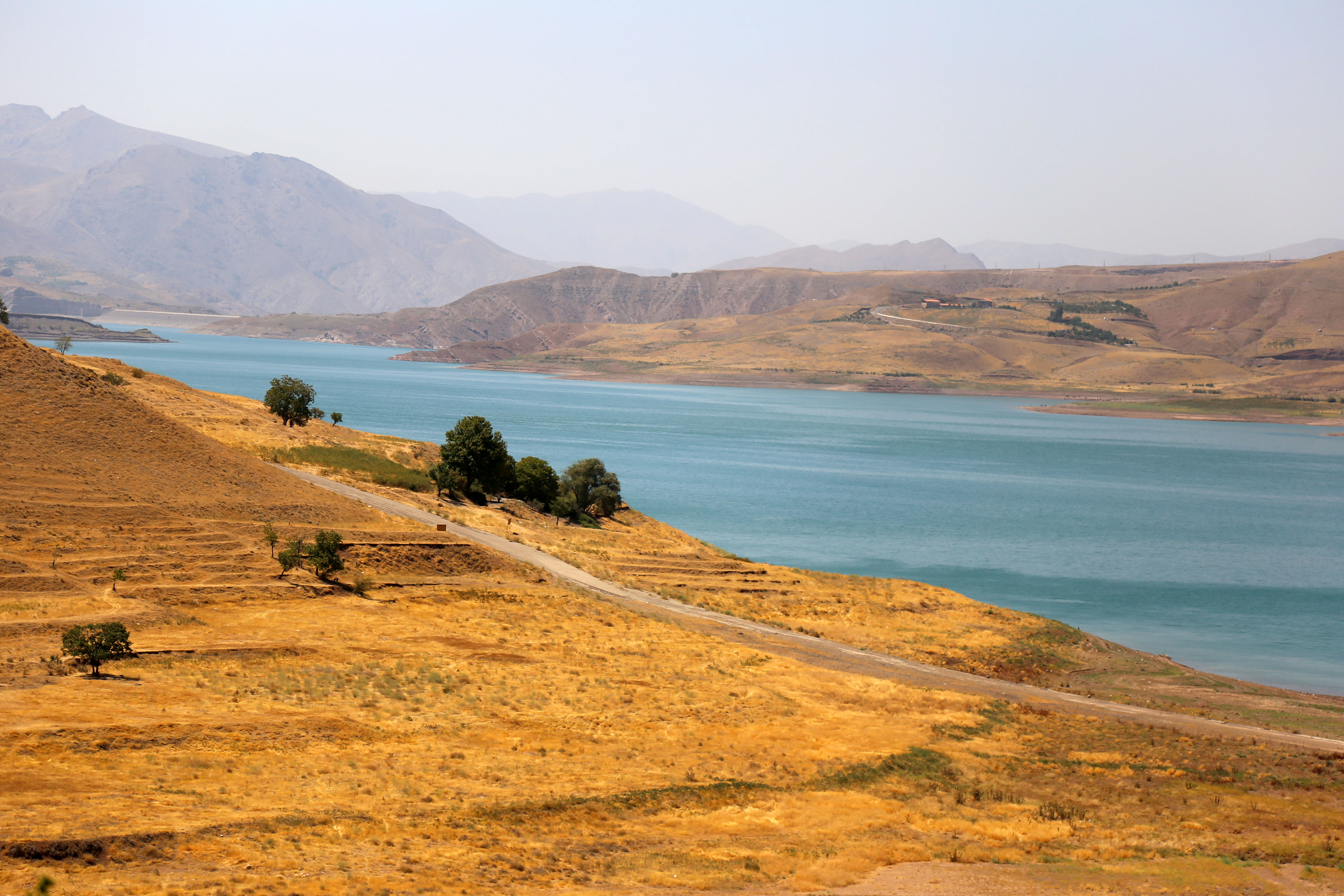
Taleqan Dam, Iran

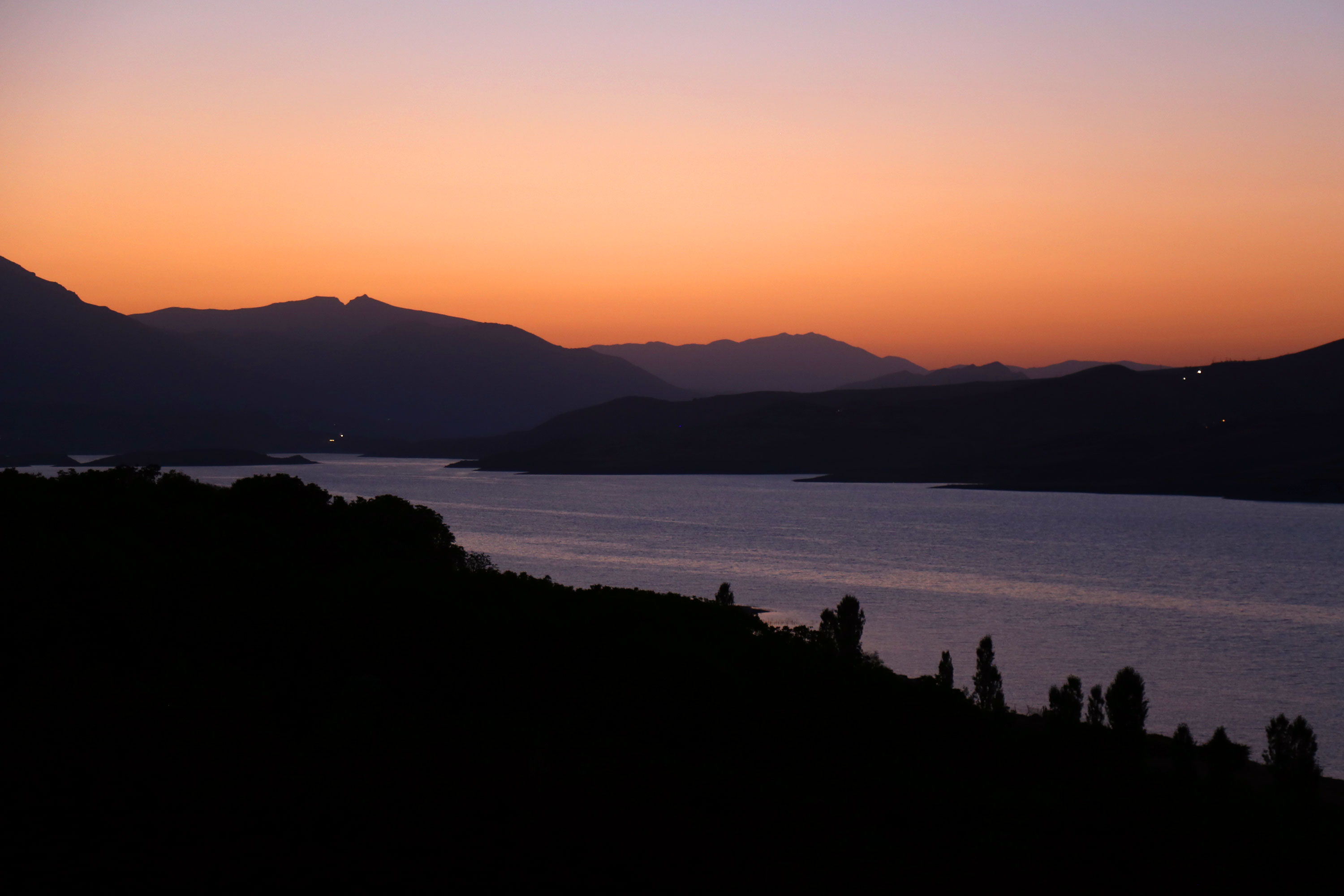
Taleqan Dam, Iran

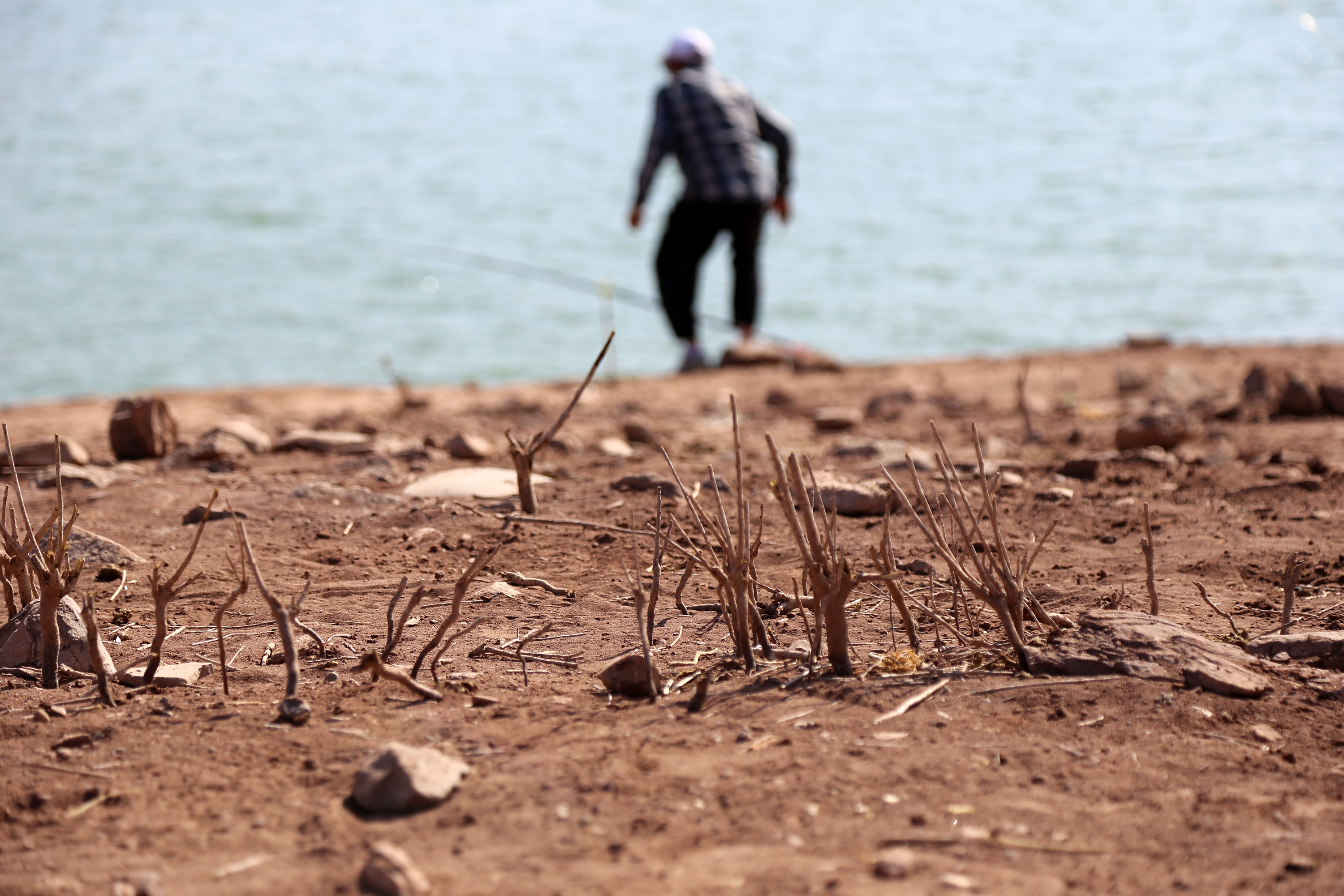
Taleqan Dam, Iran

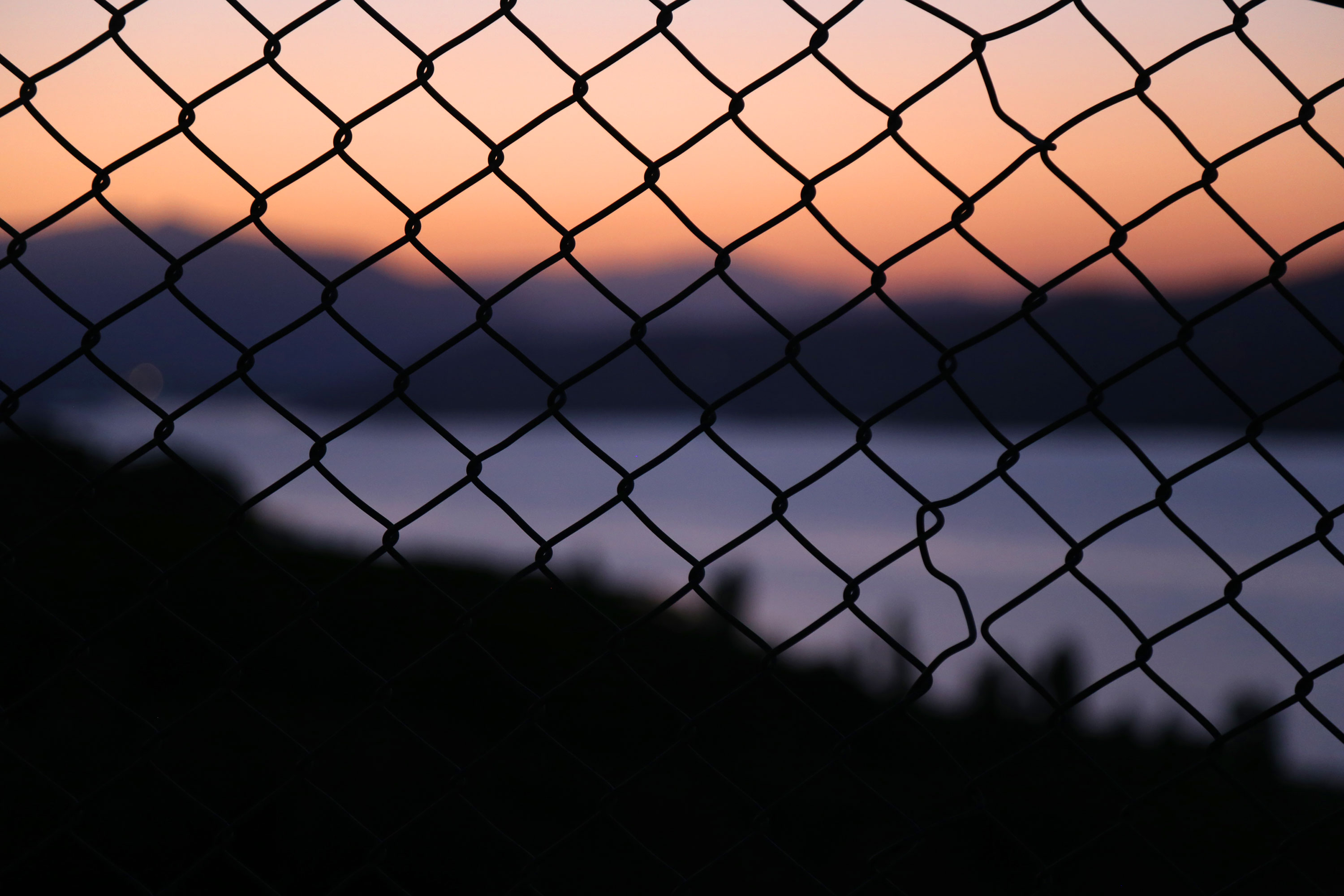
Taleqan Dam, Iran

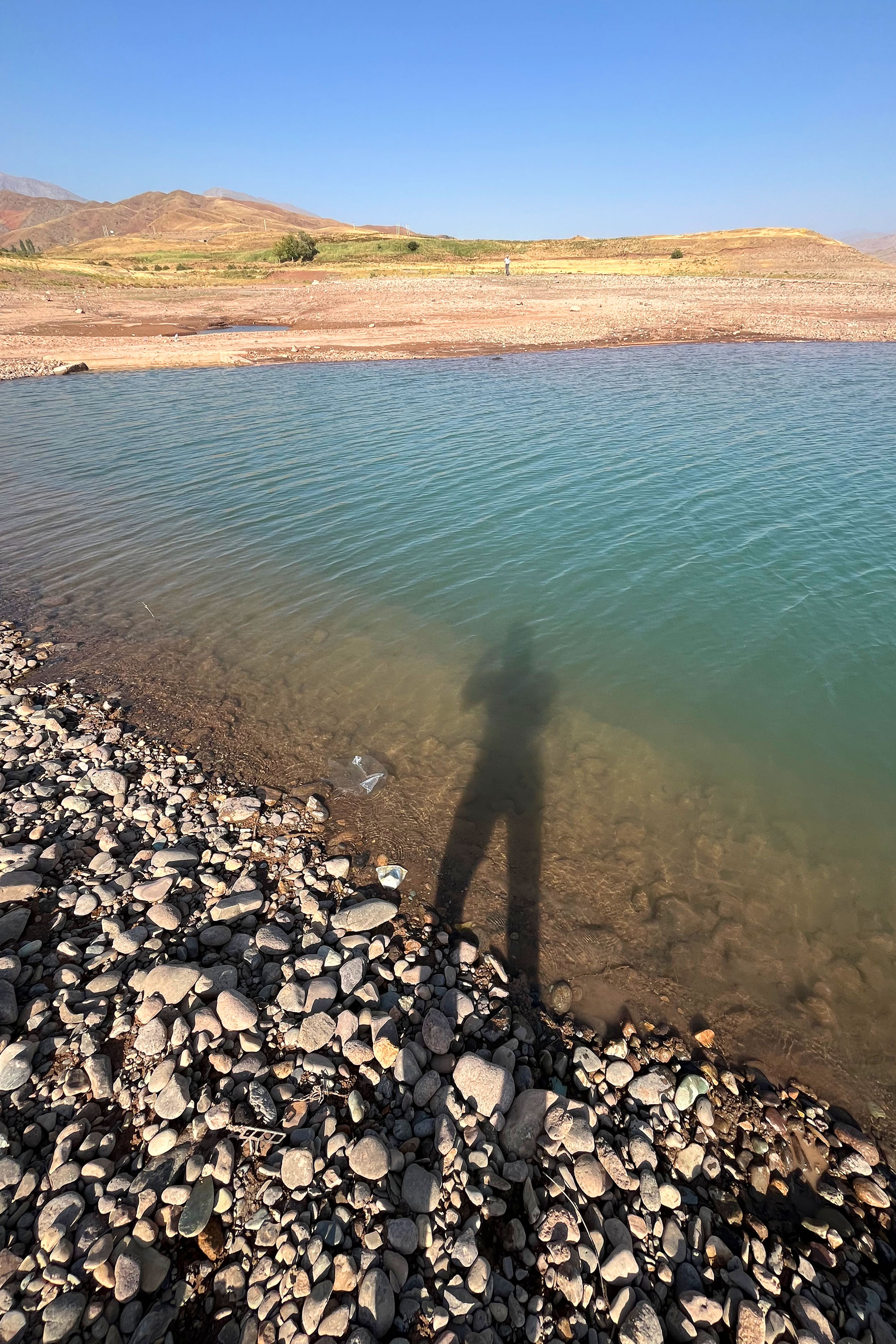
Taleqan Dam, Iran

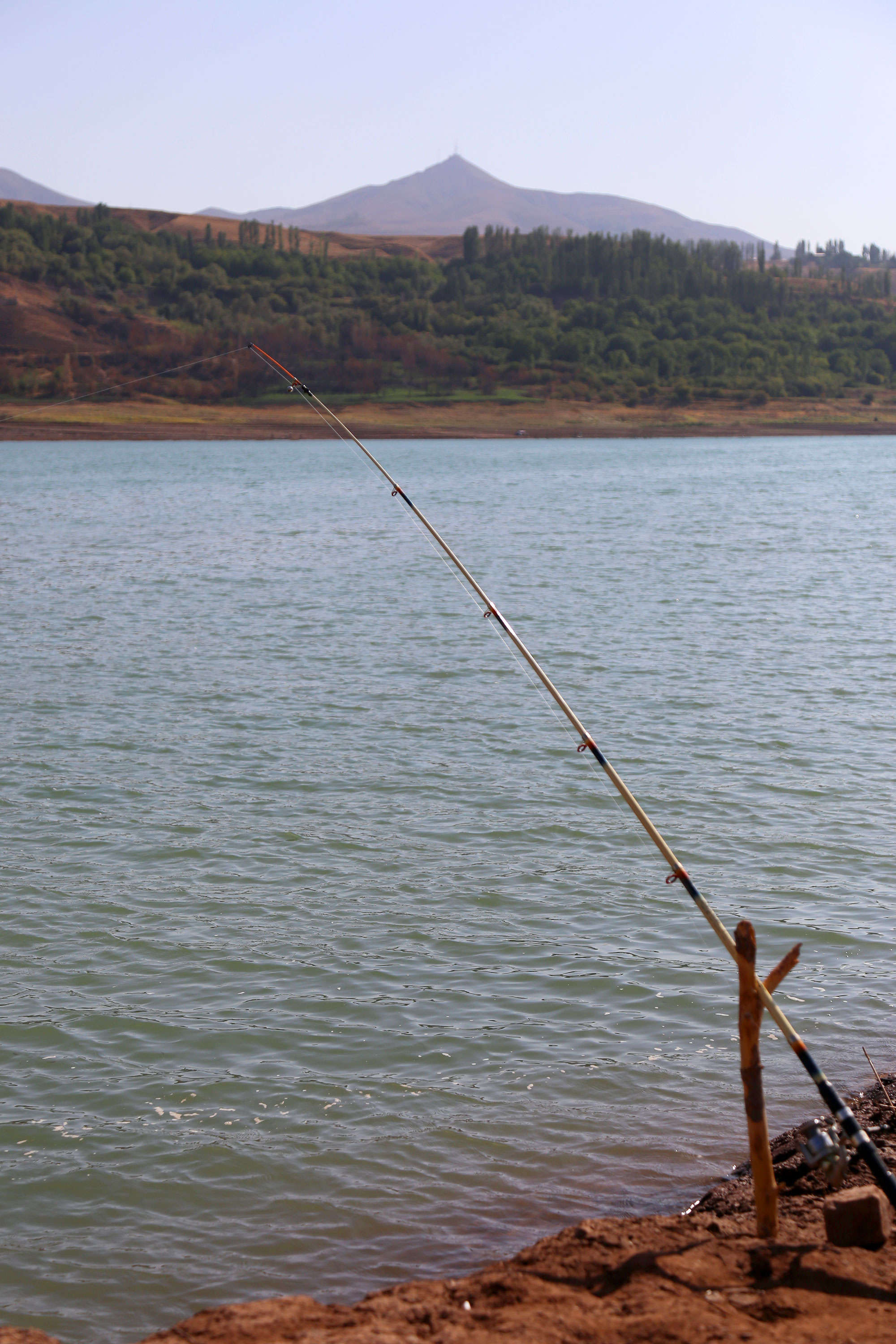
Taleqan Dam, Iran

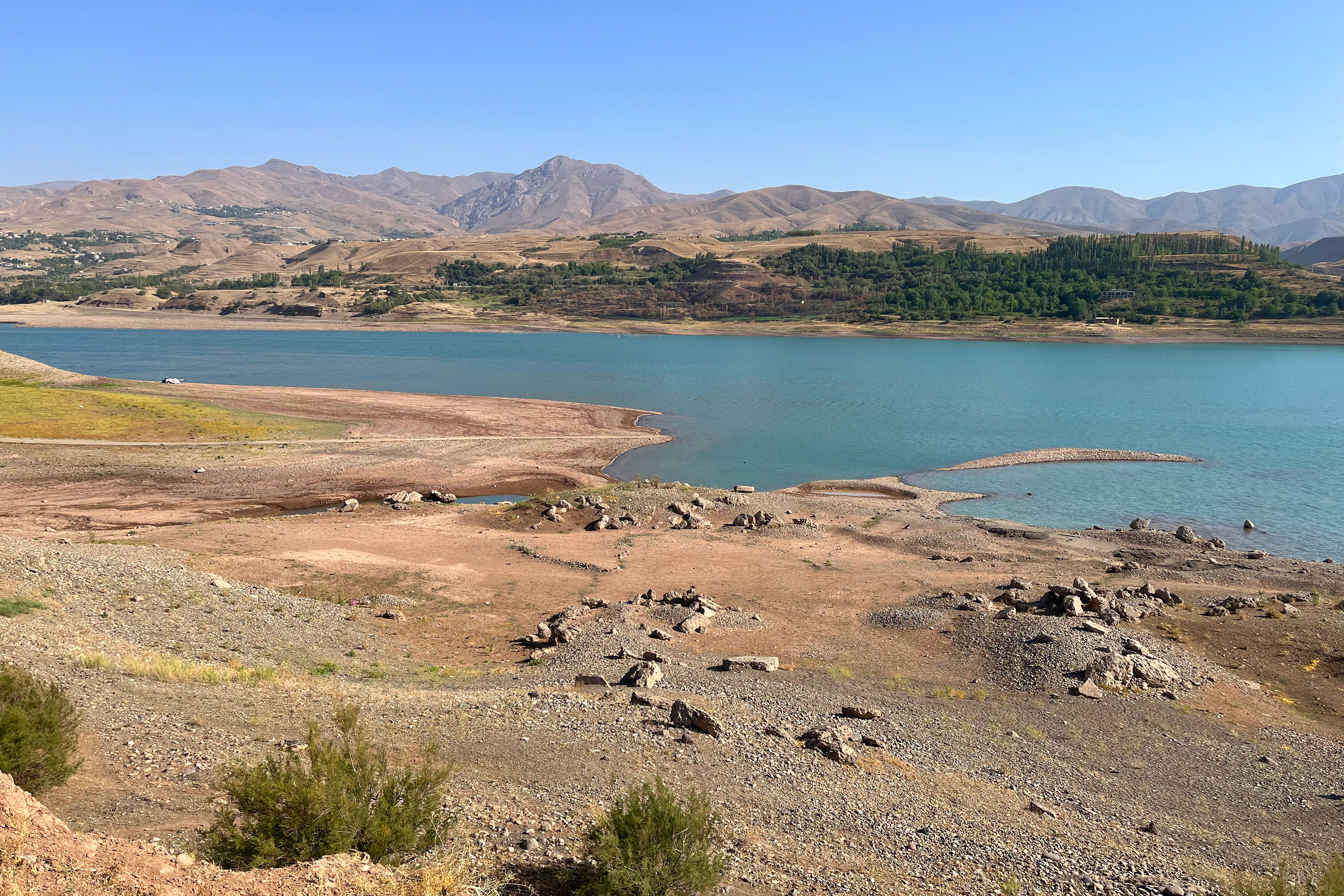
Taleqan Dam, Iran

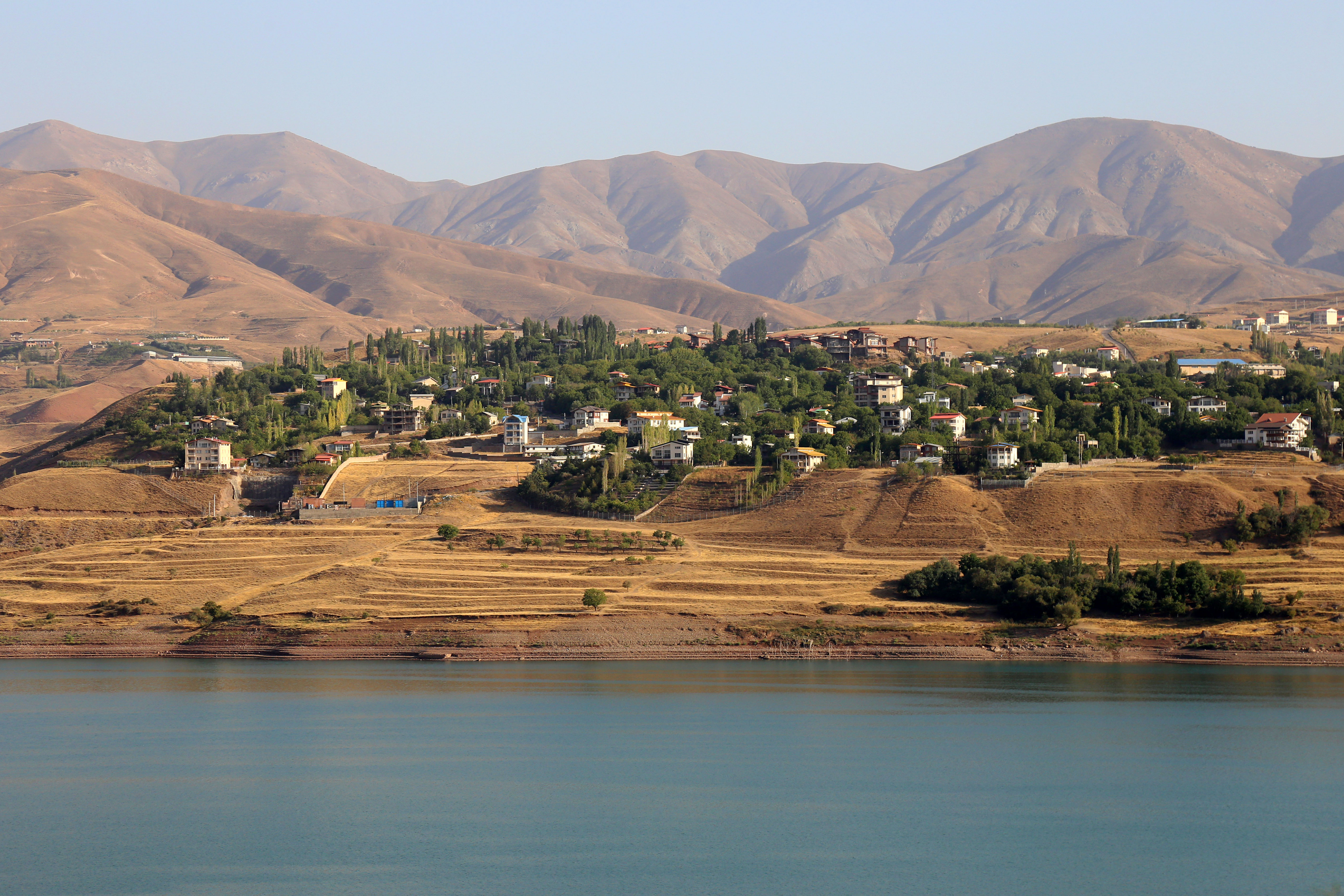
Taleqan Dam, Iran

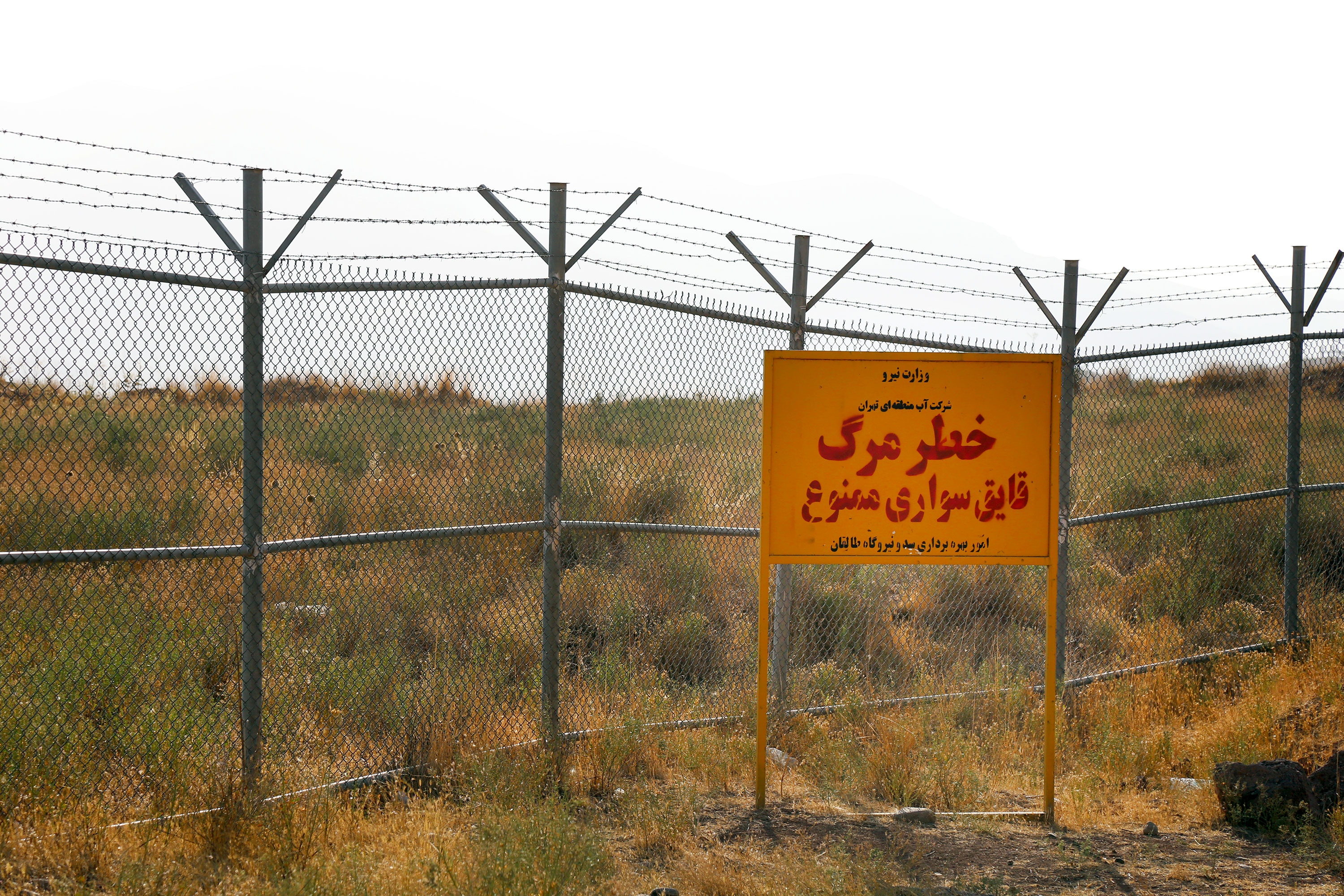
Taleqan Dam, Iran

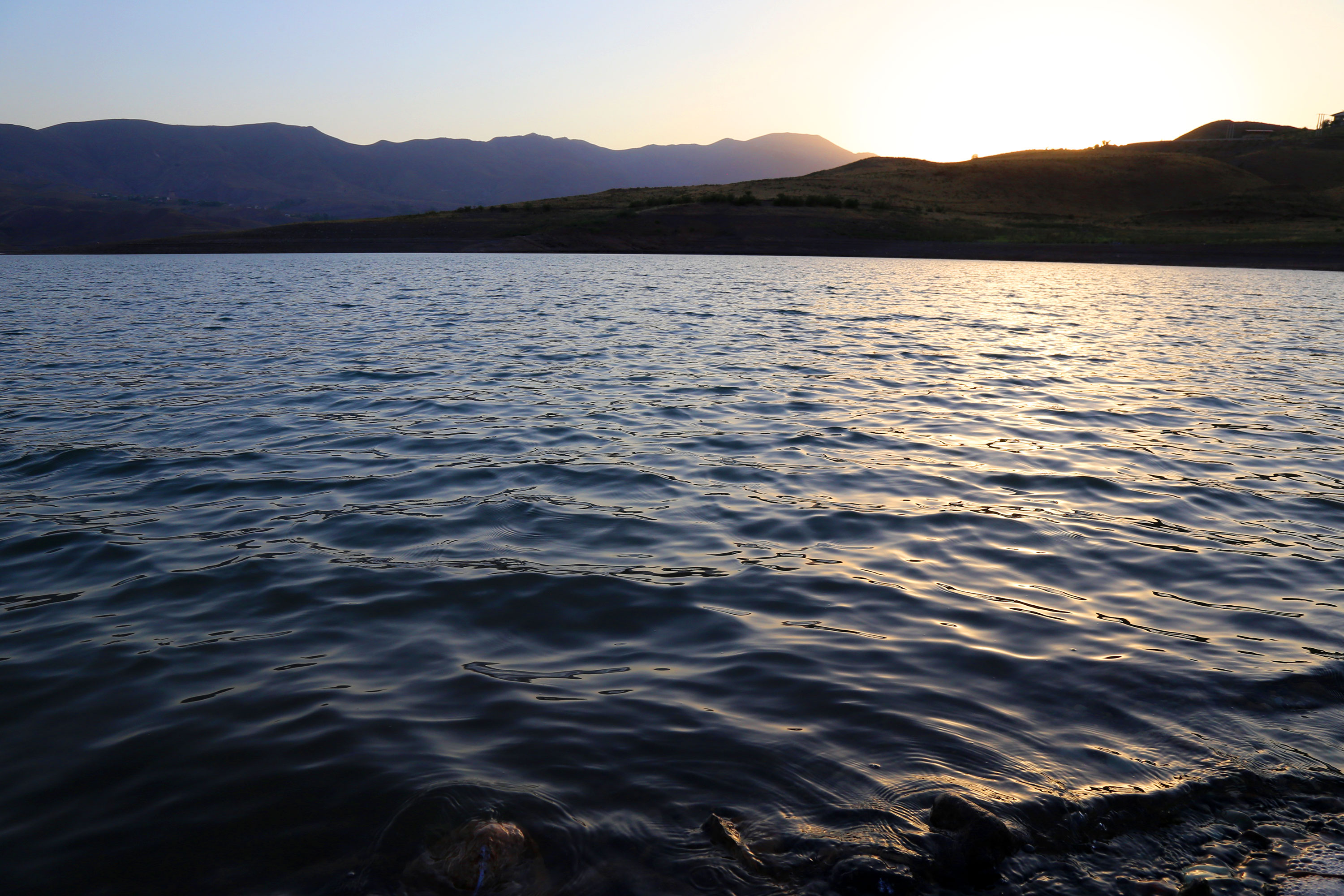
Taleqan Dam, Iran

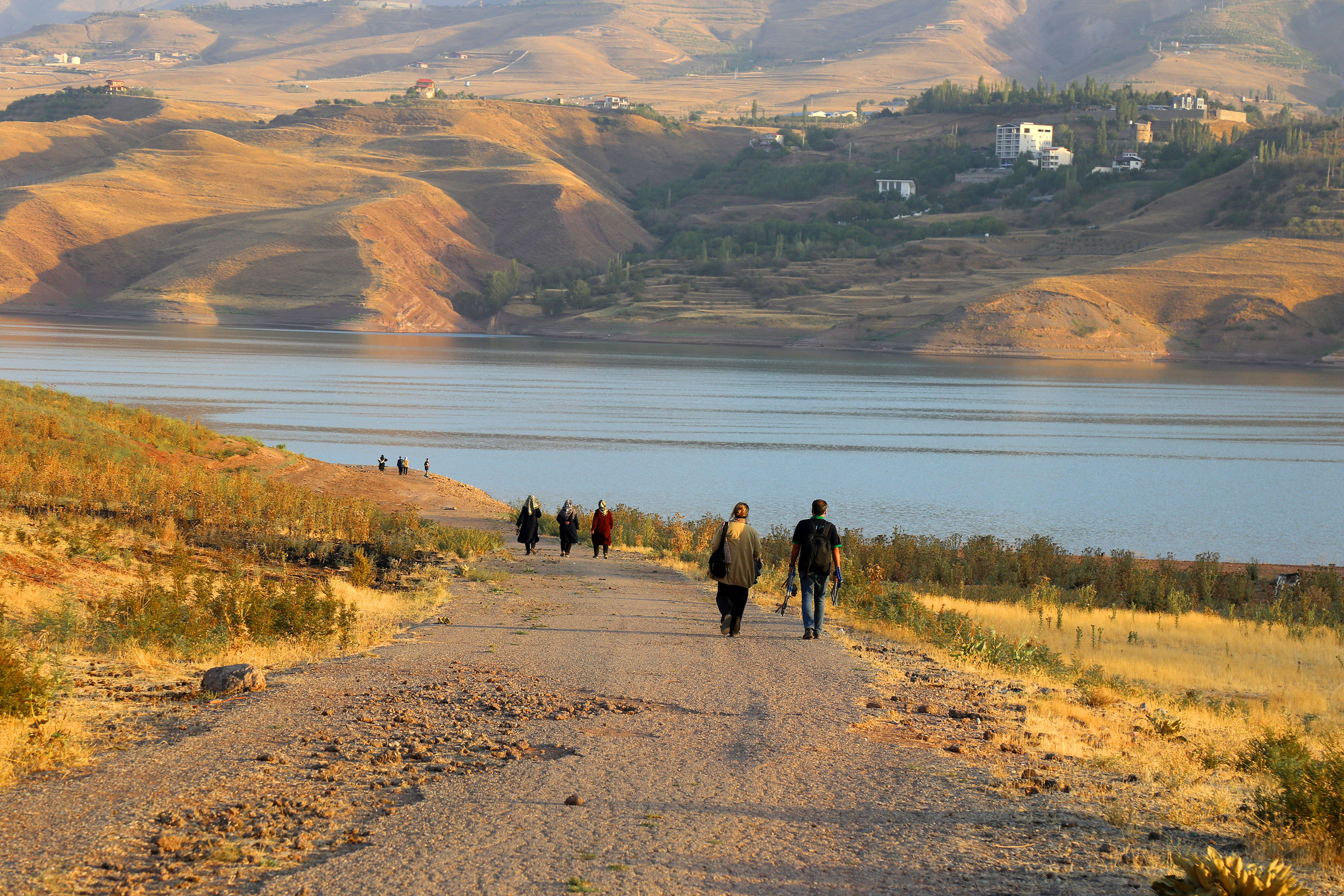
Taleqan Dam, Iran

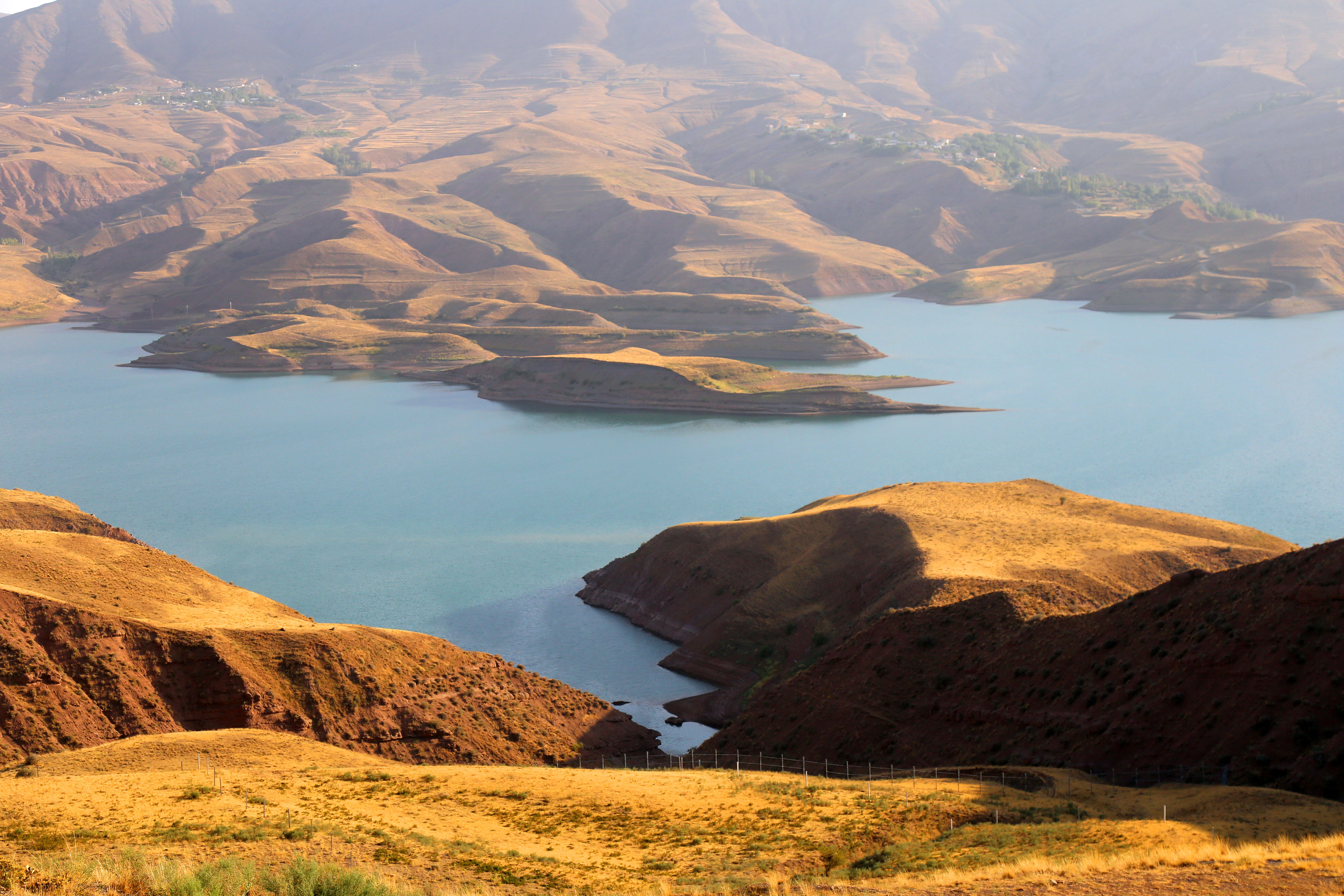
Taleqan Dam, Iran

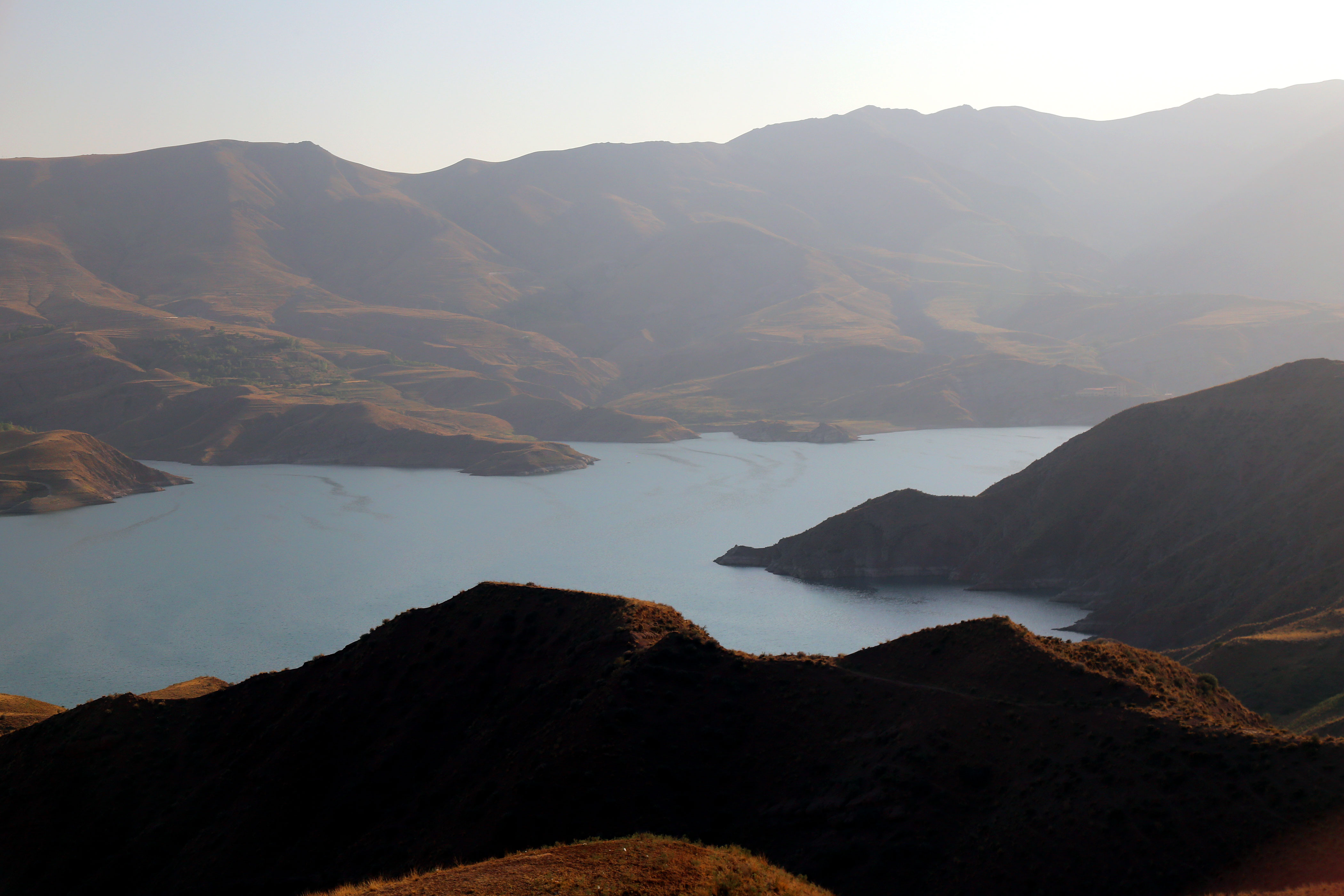
Taleqan Dam, Iran

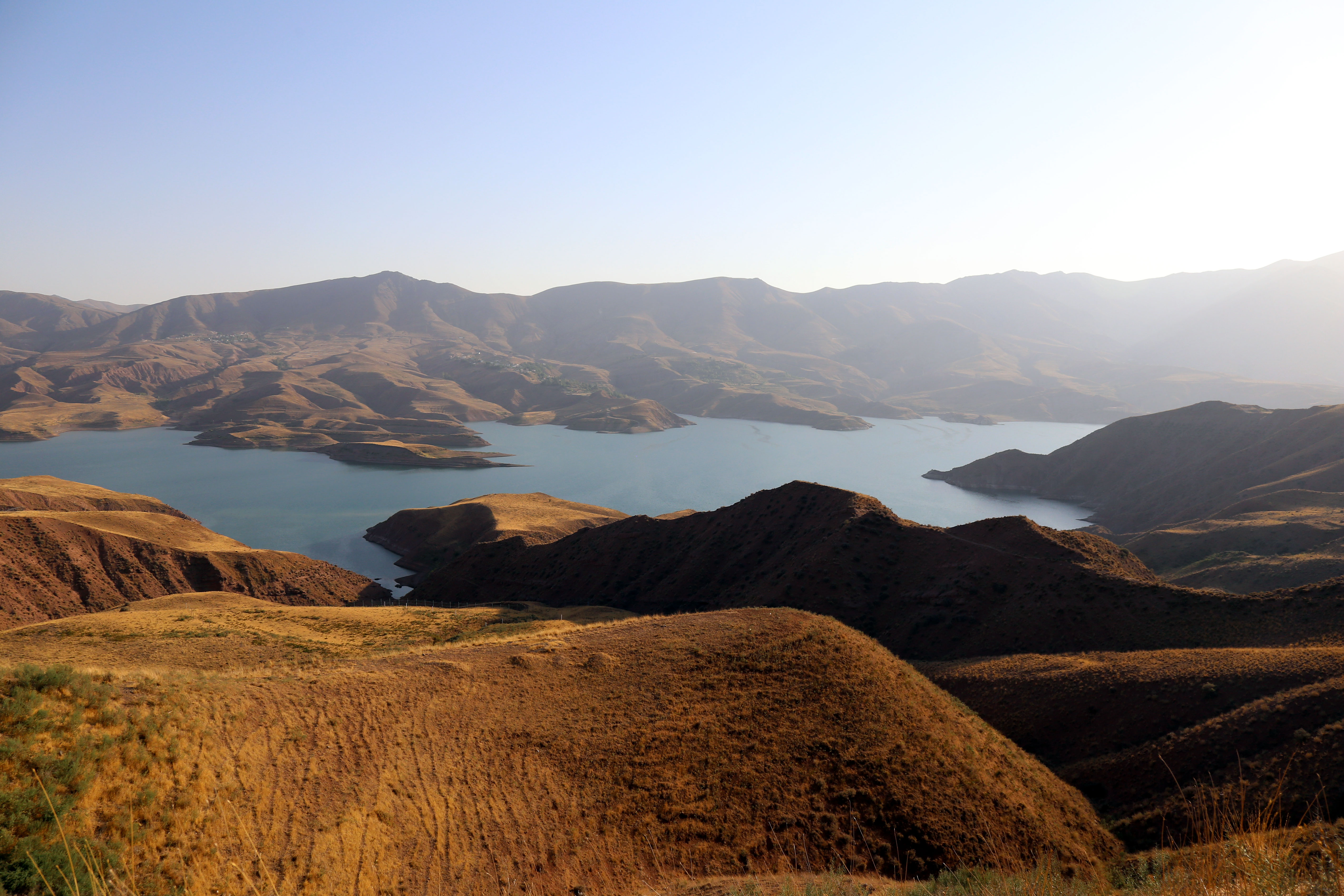
Taleqan Dam, Iran

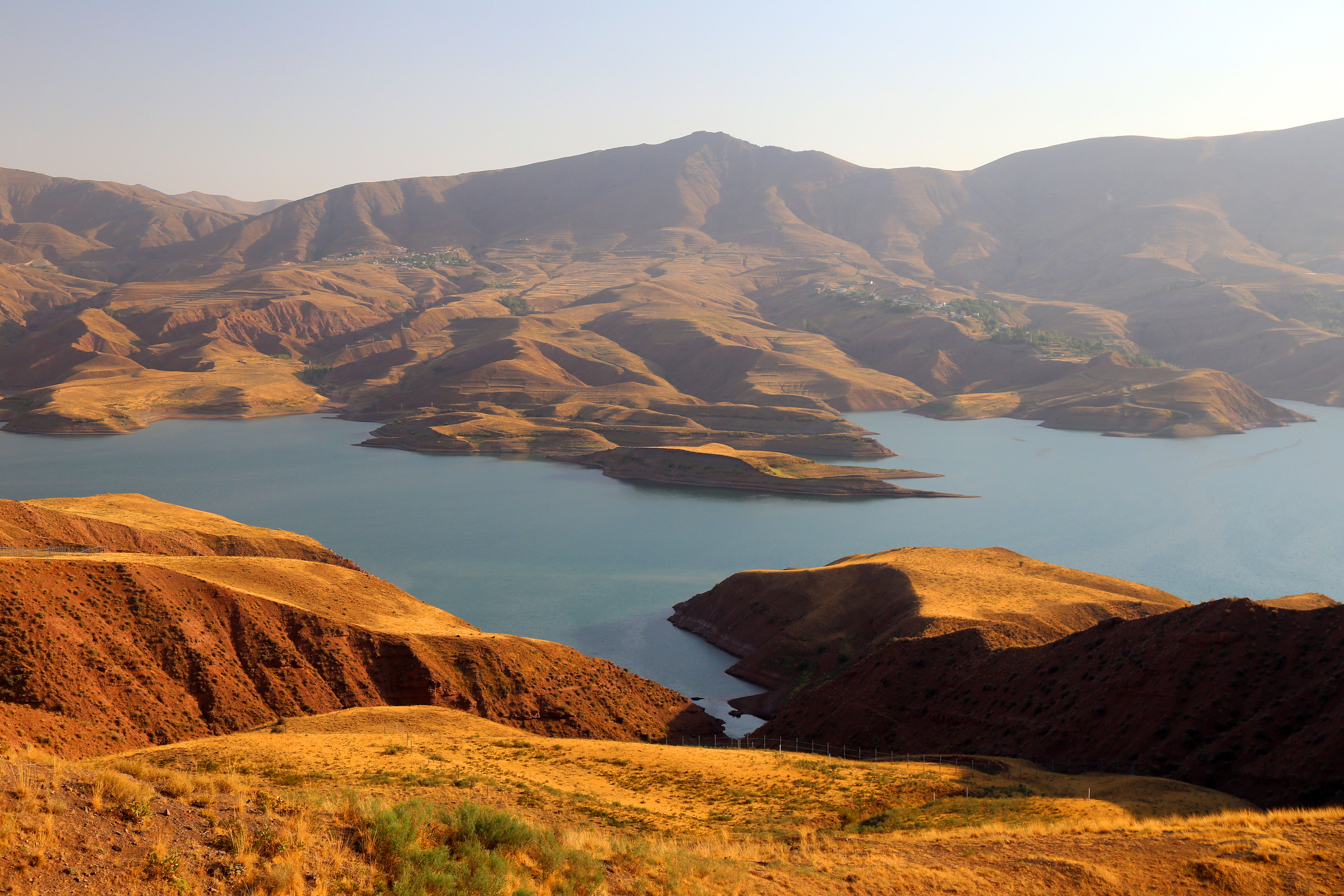
Taleqan Dam, Iran
