= Siah Bishe Pumped Storage Power Plant =

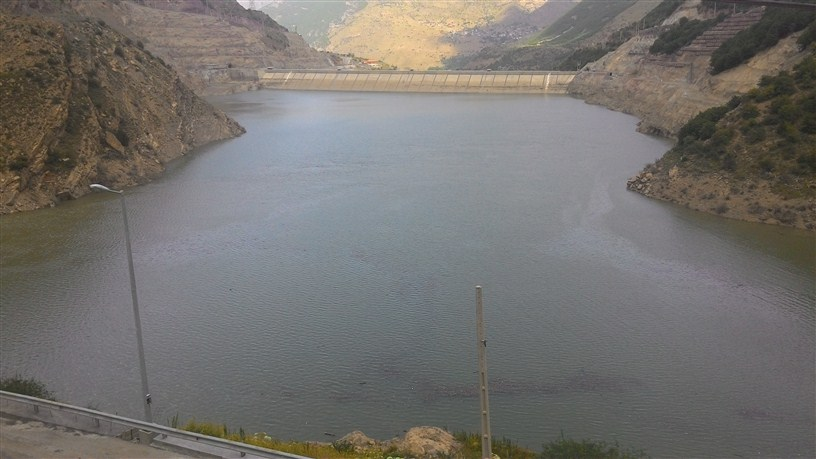
- Country: Iran
- Location: Chalus
- Status: Operational
- Construction began: 1985
- Opening date: 2013-2015
- Construction cost: $380 million (initial estimate)
- Owner(s): Iran Water & Power Resources Development Co.

Upper reservoir
- Creates: Siah Bishe Upper
- Total capacity: 4,344,220 m^{3} (3,522 acre⋅ft)

Lower reservoir
- Creates: Siah Bishe Lower
- Total capacity: 6,874,709 m^{3} (5,573 acre⋅ft)

Power Station
- Hydraulic head: Normal: 504 m (1,654 ft); Gross: 520 m (1,706 ft)
- Pump-generators: 4 x 260 MW (350,000 hp) MW reversible Francis pump-turbines
- Pumps: 4 x 235 MW (315,000 hp) MW reversible Francis pump-turbine (same as generating units)
- Installed capacity: 1,040 MW (1,390,000 hp)

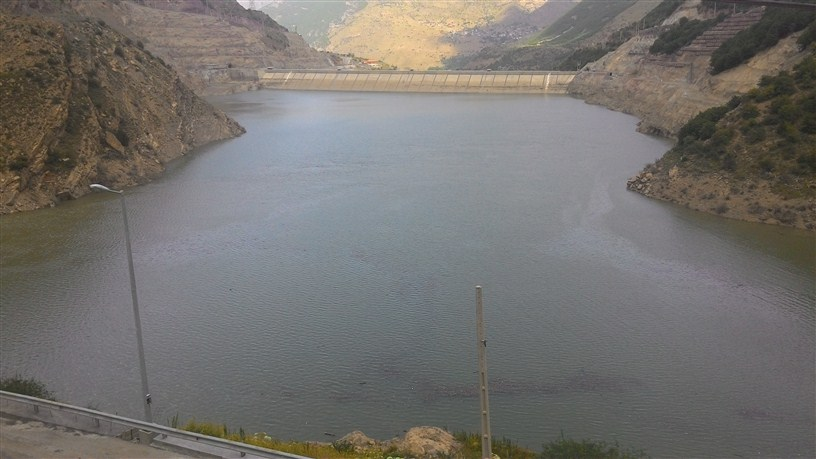
Dam of Siah Bishe Pumped Storage Power Plant

The Siah Bisheh Pumped Storage Power Plant (Persian: نیروگاه تلمبه ذخیره‌ای سیاه‌بیشه), also spelled Siyāhbisheh and Siah Bishe, is located in the Alborz Mountain range near the village of Siah Bisheh and 48 km (30 mi) south of Chalus in Mazandaran Province, Iran. The power plant uses the pumped-storage hydroelectric method to generate electricity during periods of high energy demand, making it a peaking power plant, intended to fulfill peak electricity demand in Tehran 60 km (37 mi) to the south. When complete it will have an installed generating capacity of 1,040 megawatts (1,390,000 hp) and a pumping capacity of 940 megawatts (1,260,000 hp). Planning for the project began in the 1970s and construction began in 1985. It was delayed from 1992 until 2001 and the first generator went online in May 2013. The remaining generators were commissioned by 1 September 2015. The power plant is the first pumped-storage type in Iran and will also use the country's first concrete-face rock-fill dam – two of them.

== Background ==
A site was first identified for the power plant in the 1970s when a study was carried out on the water resources of the Albors Mountains by the Belgian firm Traksionel. Several sites for dams were identified including Siah Bisheh as a potential place for a pumped-storage power plant. In 1975, a feasibility report on the Siah Bisheh project was submitted to the Ministry of Energy. The Albors Mountains study concluded in 1977 and geologic studies began in 1978 but were halted in 1979 due to the Iranian Revolution. In 1983, Lahmeyer International was contracted to create designs for Phase II (underground excavation) which were completed in 1985, the same year construction on the dam's diversion tunnels began. Further designs for Phase I (superstructures) were developed and construction continued until 1992 when a lack of funding halted the project once again. Construction would not commence again until 2001. In 2002 and 2003, contracts for the dams and power plant were awarded and construction continued. The project was 90 percent complete as of April 2012. Both the upper and lower reservoir were complete and had finished impounding in January 2013. The first of four generators was commissioned in May 2013 and the remaining were operational by 1 September 2015.

== Design and operation ==
The power plant operates using a lower and upper reservoir along with a power plant connected to both. Water is either pumped from the lower to the upper reservoir to serve as stored energy or released from the upper to the lower reservoir to generate electricity. Pumping occurs during low demand, cheap electricity, periods such as night and generating will occur during peak demand, expensive electricity, hours such as during the day. The pumping/generating process repeats as needed.

Both the upper and lower reservoirs are created by concrete-face rock-fill dams on the Chalus River which has an average inflow of 67.1 cubic metres per second (2,370 cu ft/s). The upper dam is 82.5 metres (271 ft) tall and 436 m (1,430 ft) long. It contains 1,550,000 cubic metres (2,030,000 cu yd) of fill (structural volume) and is 12 metres (39 ft) wide at its crest and 280 m (919 ft) wide at its base. Its reservoir has a storage capacity of 4,344,220 cubic metres (3,521.92 acre⋅ft) (of which 3,500,000 m^{3} (2,837 acre⋅ft) is active or usable) and a surface area of 141 square kilometres (54 sq mi). The lower reservoir dam is the bigger of the two and is 102 m (335 ft) tall and 332 metres (1,089 ft) long. It contains 2,300,000 cubic metres (3,000,000 cu yd) of fill and is 12 m (39 ft) wide at its crest and 360 metres (1,180 ft) wide at its base. Its reservoir has a storage capacity of 6,874,709 m^{3} (5,573 acre⋅ft) (of which 3,600,000 cubic metres (2,900 acre⋅ft) is active or usable) and a surface area of 141 km^{2} (54 sq mi). Each of the dams are equipped with a chute staircase spillway. The upper dam's has a maximum discharge capacity of 203 m^{3}/s (7,169 cu ft/s) and the lower: 198.25 cubic metres per second (7,001 cu ft/s). The normal elevation for the upper reservoir is 2,406.5 m (7,895 ft) and the lower 1,905.4 metres (6,251 ft) which affords a gross maximum hydraulic head of 520 m (1,706 ft) and normal of 504 metres (1,654 ft).

Connecting the upper reservoir to the power station is an intake which feeds water into two 5.7 metres (19 ft) diameter head-race tunnels. Their length from the intake to two surge tanks (used to prevent water hammer) is 2,225 metres (7,300 ft) (left tunnel) and 2,185 metres (7,169 ft) (right tunnel). From the surge tanks the tunnels each turn into a 680 metres (2,230 ft) long penstocks which delivers water to the power station which is located underground near the lower reservoir. At the power station, each penstock bifurcates into two penstocks to supply the four Francis turbine pump-generators with water. The pump-generators have a generating capacity of 260 MW and pumping capacity of 235 MW. The generators can each discharge up to 65 cubic metres per second (2,300 cu ft/s) of water and the power is converted by transformers to 400 kV. After water is discharged by the generators, it proceeds down one of two tail-race tunnels (197 metres (646 ft) and 159 metres (522 ft) in length) before being discharged into the lower reservoir. When pumping is required, the pump-generators reverse into pumps and send water back to the upper reservoir through the same water conduits. Each generator can pump up to 50 m^{3}/s (1,766 cu ft/s) of water.

AF-Consult Switzerland Ltd acted as Owner's Engineer (Lead Consultant) during the design and supervision. Tractebel Engineering GmbH (Lahmeyer International) acted as Detailed Engineering Designer (EPC Engineer) for tunnels, shafts, manifolds, caverns and electro-mechanical equipment.

== See also ==
- List of pumped-storage hydroelectric power stations
- List of power stations in Iran
- Dams in Iran
