= Eyvashan Dam =

- Interactive map of Eyvashan Dam
- Official name: سد ایوشان
- Country: Iran
- Location: Khorramabad, Lorestan province
- Purpose: Water supply
- Status: Operational
- Opening date: 2015

Dam and spillways
- Type of dam: Embankment, rock-fill
- Impounds: Horood River
- Height: 71 m (233 ft)
- Length: 676 m (2,218 ft)

Reservoir
- Total capacity: 51,750,000 m^{3} (41,950 acre⋅ft)

The Eyvashan Dam (Persian: سد ایوشان), also spelled Ashavan, is a rock-fill embankment dam on the Horood River about 40 kilometres (25 mi) east of Khorramabad in Lorestan province, Iran. It was inaugurated in February 2015.

== See also ==
- Dams in Iran
