= Shahrak-e Shahidar Jai, Bagh-e Malek =

Shahrak-e Shahidar Jai شهرك شهيدرجايي
- Village
- Location within Iran
- Coordinates: 31°27′07″N 50°01′57″E
- Country: Iran
- Province: Khuzestan
- County: Bagh-e Malek
- Bakhsh: Central
- Rural District: Haparu

Population (2006)
  - Total: 352
- Time zone: UTC+3:30 (IRST)
  - Summer (DST): UTC+4:30 (IRDT)

Shahrak-e Shahidar Jai (Persian: شهرك شهيدرجايي, also Romanized as Shahrak-e Shahīdar Jā’ī) is a village in Haparu Rural District, in the Central District of Bagh-e Malek County, Khuzestan Province, Iran. At the 2006 census, its population was 352, in 67 families.
