= Barzoo Dam =

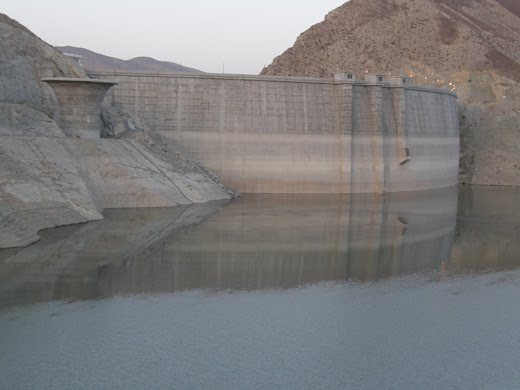
- Interactive map of Barzoo Dam
- Official name: Barzoo Dam
- Location: Shirvan, Iran
- Construction began: January 1994
- Opening date: December 2001

Dam and spillways
- Type of dam: Double arch concrete
- Impounds: river قلجق
- Height: 63 m (207 ft)
- Height (foundation): 83 m (272 ft)
- Length: 325 m (1,066 ft)
- Width (crest): 6 m (20 ft)
- Dam volume: 92,000,000 m^{3} (120,000,000 cu yd)

Reservoir
- Surface area: 54.8 km^{2} (21.2 sq mi)

Barzoo Dam (Persian: سد بارزو), also Shirvan Dam, is located 40 km north of Shirvan city in North Khorasan province, northeastern Iran and is 600 km east of Tehran, the capital of Iran. Shirvan Dam is located at an altitude of 1413 meters above sea level.

This dam was built in 1994 with the aim of making Shirvan and its suburbs irrigated. In 2002, in order to store water caused by seasonal floods and to provide part of drinking water and agriculture, the land was put into construction operation. Therefore, this dam was built on Qalchaq river. Its storage capacity is 92 million cubic meters with a stable safety level of 8.5 million cubic meters and is the fourth dam in North Khorasan province.

Shirvan city, as the second most populous city of North Khorasan, supplies its required water through this dam. The city has 14 water storage sources. In some cases, due to climatic reasons, the volume of the river water and water storage of the dam decreases and causes water shortage or drought, which in this case the problem of drinking water is always provided by the existing underground storage capacity. In some seasonal conditions, river water and dam reserves increase with water, which causes floods and muddy water. Due to this situation, the governor of Shirvan stated in a speech:

According to the weather forecast of the region, droughts are on the rise, which will definitely cause concerns and problems.

That is why the protection of water resources is a public duty today, and we must have proper planning so that we do not face a water shortage crisis.

The land around this dam is mostly hilly, but on the east side of it, is mountainous, therefore the dam is in a valley. Near the dam, a very small population of people live there, so its land distribution is one person per square kilometer. The smallest community in the area belongs to a man named Nazar Mohammad, who lives 13 km north of the dam. The areas around the dam are mainly grasslands and pastures.

== Climate ==
The climatic conditions in this region are cold and dry. average temperature of the year is 13 degrees Celsius. The warmest month is July with an average temperature of 28 degrees Celsius and the coldest month of the year is January with minus 6 degrees Celsius. The average annual rainfall is 446 mm, and the wettest month is March with 101 mm of rainfall. The driest month is September, with 3 mm of rainfall.
