= Deh Khosrow =

Deh Khosrow ده خسرو
- Village
- Location within Iran
- Coordinates: 33°34′02″N 47°40′54″E
- Country: Iran
- Province: Lorestan
- County: Kuhdasht
- Bakhsh: Central
- Rural District: Kuhdasht-e Jonubi

Population (2006)
  - Total: 104
- Time zone: UTC+3:30 (IRST)
  - Summer (DST): UTC+4:30 (IRDT)

Deh Khosrow (Persian: ده خسرو; also known as Dāvūd Rashīd-e Khosrow, Dāvūd Rash, Dāvūd Rashīd, and Shahīd Rajā’ī) is a village in Kuhdasht-e Jonubi Rural District, in the Central District of Kuhdasht County, Lorestan Province, Iran. At the 2006 census, its population was 104, in 22 families.
