= Eskaleh-ye Shahid Rajai =

Eskaleh-ye Shahid Rajai اسكله شهيدرجائي
- Village
- Country: Iran
- Province: Hormozgan
- County: Bandar Abbas
- Bakhsh: Central
- Rural District: Gachin

Population (2006)
  - Total: 42
- Time zone: UTC+3:30 (IRST)
  - Summer (DST): UTC+4:30 (IRDT)

Eskaleh-ye Shahid Rajai (Persian: اسكله شهيدرجائي, also Romanized as Esḵaleh-ye Shahīd Rajā‘ī) is a village in Gachin Rural District, in the Central District of Bandar Abbas County, Hormozgan Province, Iran. At the 2006 census, its population was 42, in 19 families.
