= Shahid Rajaee Dam =

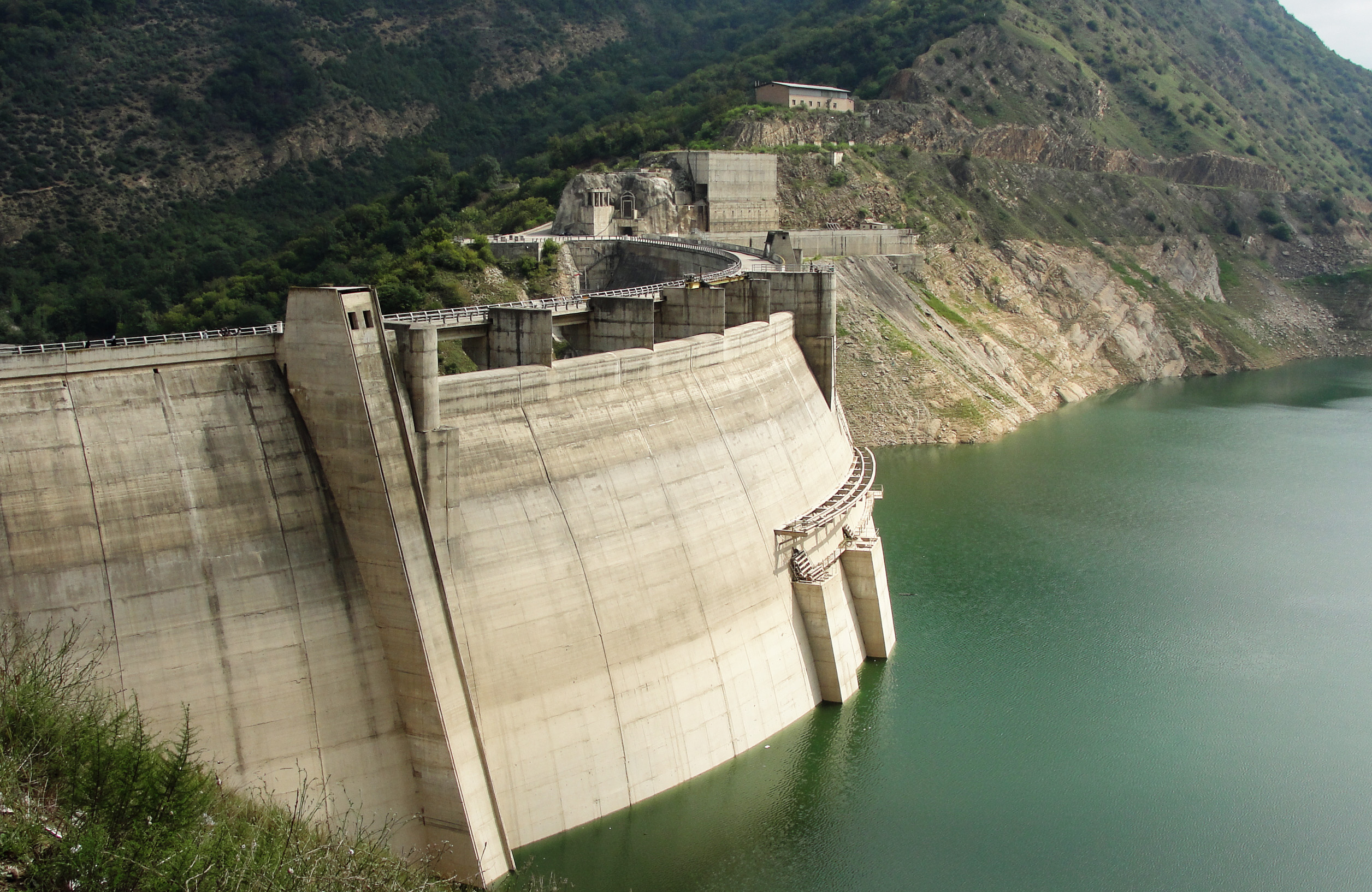
- The upstream face of the dam
- Interactive map of Shahid Rajaee Dam
- Country: Iran
- Location: Sari, Mazandaran Province
- Purpose: Power, water supply, flood control
- Status: Operational
- Construction began: 1987
- Opening date: 1997

Dam and spillways
- Type of dam: Arch, variable-radius
- Impounds: Tajan River
- Height (foundation): 138 m (453 ft)
- Length: 430 m (1,411 ft)
- Width (crest): 7 m (23 ft)
- Width (base): 27 m (89 ft)

Reservoir
- Total capacity: 160,000,000 m^{3} (129,714 acre⋅ft)
- Surface area: 520 ha (2 mi^{2})
- Maximum length: 8.5 km (5 mi)

Power Station
- Operator: Mazandaran Regional Water Authority
- Commission date: 2007
- Hydraulic head: 91 m (299 ft)
- Turbines: 3 x 4.5 MW Francis-type
- Installed capacity: 13.5 MW

Shahid Rajaee Dam, also known as the Soleyman Tangeh Dam, is an arch dam on the Tajan River, located about 38 km (24 mi) south of Sari in Mazandaran Province, Iran. The dam was built for hydroelectric power production, flood control and to provide water for industrial and agricultural use. Construction on the dam began in 1987 and it was complete in 1997. In 2000 the power plant portion of the project was given to Iran Water & Power Resources Development Co. from the Mazandaran Regional Water Authority. An earthquake halted the project in 2002 but the power plant was completed in 2007.

It is named after ex-prime minister and president of Iran, Mohammad-Ali Rajai who was killed in a terrorist attack.

== See also ==
- List of power stations in Iran
- List of tallest dams in the world
- Port of Shahid Rajaee
- Dams in Iran
