= Shahrak-e Shahid Rejai, Fasa =

Shahrak-e Shahid Rejai شهرك شهيد رجايي
- Village
- Country: Iran
- Province: Fars
- County: darab
- Bakhsh: Central
- Rural District: Absalan

Area
  - Total: 8 km^{2} (3.1 sq mi)

Population (2001)
  - Total: 370
  - Density: 46/km^{2} (120/sq mi)
- Time zone: UTC+3:30 (IRST)
  - Summer (DST): UTC+4:30 (IRDT)

Shahrak-e Shahid Rejai (Persian: شهرك شهيد رجايي, also Romanized as Shahrak-e Shahīd Rejā’ī) is a village in Jangal Rural District, in the Central District of Fasa County, Fars province, Iran. At the 2006 census, its population was 182, in 50 families.
