= Shahrak-e Shahid Rajai, Ramhormoz =

Shahrak-e Shahid Rajai شهرك شهيدرجايي
- Village
- Location within Iran
- Coordinates: 31°06′46″N 49°53′41″E
- Country: Iran
- Province: Khuzestan
- County: Ramhormoz
- Bakhsh: Central
- Rural District: Abolfares

Population (2006)
  - Total: 117
- Time zone: UTC+3:30 (IRST)
  - Summer (DST): UTC+4:30 (IRDT)

Shahrak-e Shahid Rajai (Persian: شهرك شهيدرجايي, also Romanized as Shahrak-e Shahīd Rajā’ī; also known as Shahrak-e Rajā’ī and Shahrak-e Shahīd Rajā’ī-ye Mīr Sālārī) is a village in Abolfares Rural District, in the Central District of Ramhormoz County, Khuzestan Province, Iran. At the 2006 census, its population was 117, in 22 families.
