= Shahrak-e Shahid Rajai, Hormozgan =

Shahrak-e Shahid Rajai شهرك شهيد رجائي
- Village
- Country: Iran
- Province: Hormozgan
- County: Bandar Abbas
- Bakhsh: Central
- Rural District: Gachin

Population (2006)
  - Total: 966
- Time zone: UTC+3:30 (IRST)
  - Summer (DST): UTC+4:30 (IRDT)

Shahrak-e Shahid Rajai (Persian: شهرك شهيد رجائي, also Romanized as Shahrak-e Shahīd Rajā’ī) is a village in Gachin Rural District, in the Central District of Bandar Abbas County, Hormozgan Province, Iran. At the 2006 census, its population was 966, in 245 families.
