= Borzu =

Borzu or Berzu or Barzu (Persian: برزو) may refer to:

== Places in Iran ==
- Barzu, North Khorasan
- Borzu, Karrab, Sabzevar County, Razavi Khorasan Province
- Borzu, Qasabeh-ye Gharbi, Sabzevar County, Razavi Khorasan Province
- Berzu, Zaveh, Razavi Khorasan Province

== See also ==
- Borzu Nama, a Persian epic poem and the main character Borzu
- Deh-e Borzu (disambiguation)
