= Sadid =

Sadid or Sedid (Arabic: سديد)(Persian: سديد) may refer to:

- Sedid, Razavi Khorasan
- Sadid, South Khorasan
- Sadid Industrial Group, Iranian industrial conglomerate
- Sadid Hossain, Bangladeshi cricketer
- Sadid al-Din al-Kazaruni (fl. 14th century), Persian physician
- Sadid Mibzal, Sylheti Artist
