= Sar Pushideh =

Sar Pushideh or Sarpushideh (Persian: سرپوشيده) may refer to:

- Sar Pushideh, Bagh-e Malek
- Sar Pushideh, Izeh

== See also ==
- Robat-e Sar Pushideh
