= Barzu =

Barzu may refer to:

- Bârz, a river in Romania
- Bârzu, a Romanian name for Podilsk in Ukraine
- Barzu, North Khorasan, a village in Iran

== See also ==
- Borzu (disambiguation)
