= Wind power in Iran =

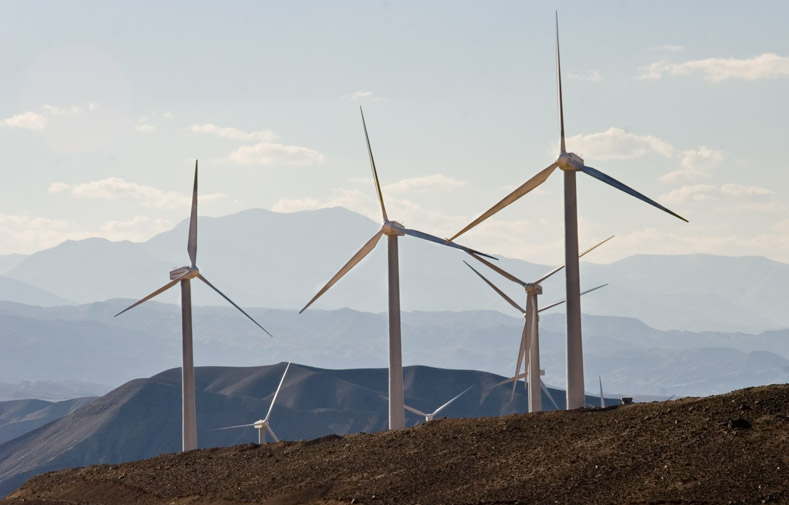
As a further drive toward diversification of energy sources, Iran has also established wind farms in several areas, this one near Manjeel.

The energy system of Iran relies primarily on fossil fuels. However, the country has made steps to decrease its dependency on fossil fuels by investing in wind power. Iran's installed wind power capacity grew from 25 MW in 2004 to 32 MW in 2005 and 45 MW in 2006. By 2009, total wind power capacity reached 130 MW. This was a result of the development of larger wind farms in coastal and windy areas of Iran, such as Manjeel (Gilan province) and Binaloud (Razavi Khorasan Province). In 2021, Iran's total capacity of onshore wind power grew by 0.6%.

By 2021, the total installed wind power capacity in Iran was 310 MW. In March 2023, 'Mil Nader' 50-MW wind farm became operation in Sistan and Baluchestan province.

== History ==
Energy infrastructure of Iran was mainly based on fossil fuels. However, by investing in wind electricity, the country has taken measures to reduce its reliance on fossil fuels. With the help from Sadid Industrial Group (Iranian manufacturing company) and investments as well as resources from Indian (Sulzon Energy) and German (Siemens) wind turbine companies, Iran has been able to build a strong and stable wind sector.

To boost up the wind energy production, the Renewable Energy Organization of Iran (SUNA) based its new feed-in tariff policy on the German equivalent, assured government electricity sales for 20 years, and implemented a 15% tax cut for businesses using domestic components.

According to the Iranian minister of powder, before the revolution, foreign states provided the infrastructure for the electricity sector in Iran, and Iranian technicians were only permitted to replace the transformer oil. Today, however, the Iranian electricity sector has almost entirely attained self-sufficiency.

== Largest wind farms ==
Project	Capacity (MW)	Province
Binalood	61.2	Razavi Khorasan
Siahpoosh	48.18	Gilan
Mil Nader	50	Sistan and Baluchestan province
Manjil	28.37	Gilan
Aqkand	20	East Azerbaijan province
Takistan	55	Qazvin

== See also ==
- Manjil and Rudbar Wind Farm
- Binalood wind farm
- Iran–Armenia Wind Farm
- Energy of Iran
- List of power stations in Iran
- International Persian Group - IPG
- Renewable energy in Iran
- Renewable energy by country

== Bibliography ==
1. F., F., N., S., S., S., & M.A., R. (2015). Assessment of wind energy potential and economics in the north-western Iranian cities of Tabriz and Ardabil. Renewable and Sustainable Energy Reviews, v45, 87-99.
2. Fatemeh Rahimzadeh Affiliation: Atmospheric Science and Meteorological Research Center (ASMERC), T. I., & Affiliation:, A. M. (2011). Wind speed variability over Iran and its impact on wind power potential: a case study for Esfehan Province. Meteorological Applications, v18 n2, 198-210.
3. Gholamhassan Najafi Affiliation: Tarbiat Modares University, P. B.-1., & Barat Ghobadian Affiliation: Tarbiat Modares University, P. B.-1. (2015). LLK1694-wind energy resources and development in Iran. Renewable and Sustainable Energy Reviews, v15 n6, 2719-2728.
4. Julien Mercille Affiliation: School of Geography, P. a., & Alun Jones Affiliation: School of Geography, P. a. (2009). Practicing Radical Geopolitics: Logics of Power and the Iranian Nuclear “Crisis”. Annals of the Association of American Geographers, v99 n5, 856-862.
5. Kasra Mohammadi Affiliation: Department of Mechanical and Industrial Engineering, U. o., Ali Mostafaeipour Affiliation: Industrial Engineering Department, Y. U., & Affiliat, A. S. (2009). Application and economic viability of wind turbine installation in Lutak, Iran. Environmental Earth Sciences, v75 n3, 1-16.
6. Sayed Moslem Mousavi Affiliation: Sharif University of Technology, I., & Morteza Bagheri Ghanbarabadi Affiliation: Sharif University of Technology, I. (2015). The competitiveness of wind power compared to existing methods of electricity generation in Iran. Energy Policy, v42 (201203), 651-656.
7. Wyn Q Bowen Affiliation: Defence Studies Department, K. C., & London, J. K. (2004). The Iranian Nuclear Challenge. International Affairs, v80 n2, 257-276.
