= Kalateh-ye Hajji Barat =

Kalateh-ye Hajji Barat كلاته حاجي برات
- Village
- Location within Iran
- Coordinates: 36°16′57″N 57°45′33″E
- Country: Iran
- Province: Razavi Khorasan
- County: Sabzevar
- Bakhsh: Central
- Rural District: Qasabeh-ye Sharqi

Population (2006)
  - Total: 12
- Time zone: UTC+3:30 (IRST)
  - Summer (DST): UTC+4:30 (IRDT)

Kalateh-ye Hajji Barat (Persian: كلاته حاجي برات, also Romanized as Kalāteh-ye Ḩājjī Barāt) is a village in Qasabeh-ye Sharqi Rural District, in the Central District of Sabzevar County, Razavi Khorasan Province, Iran. At the 2006 census, its population was 12, in 4 families.
