= Beynaq =

Beynaq or Beynoq or Binaq (Persian: بينق) may refer to:

- Binaq, East Azerbaijan
- Beynaq, Razavi Khorasan
