= Karrab =

Karrab or Karab or Korrab or Korab (Persian: كراب) may refer to:

- Korrab, East Azerbaijan
- Karrab, Razavi Khorasan
- Karrab Rural District, in Razavi Khorasan Province
