= Sang-e Sefid, Sabzevar =

Village in Razavi Khorasan province, Iran

Sang-e Sefid Persian: سنگ سفيد
- Village
- Location within Iran
- Coordinates: 36°19′10″N 57°41′48″E
- Country: Iran
- Province: Razavi Khorasan
- County: Sabzevar
- District: Central
- Rural District: Qasabeh-ye Sharqi

Population (2016)
  - Total: 531
- Time zone: UTC+3:30 (IRST)

Sang-e Sefid (Persian: سنگ سفيد) (Note: Also romanized as Sang Sefid, Sang-e Sefīd, and Sang-i-Sefīd) is a village in Qasabeh-ye Sharqi Rural District of the Central District in Sabzevar County, Razavi Khorasan province, Iran.

== Demographics ==
=== Population ===
At the time of the 2006 National Census, the village's population was 390 in 129 households. The following census in 2011 counted 483 people in 186 households. The 2016 census measured the population of the village as 531 people in 194 households.
