= Kaskan =

Village in Razavi Khorasan province, Iran

Kaskan Persian: کسکن
- Village
- Location within Iran
- Coordinates: 36°16′31″N 57°33′11″E
- Country: Iran
- Province: Razavi Khorasan
- County: Sabzevar
- District: Central
- Rural District: Qasabeh-ye Gharbi

Population (2016)
  - Total: 426
- Time zone: UTC+3:30 (IRST)

Kaskan (Persian: کسکن) is a village in Qasabeh-ye Gharbi Rural District of the Central District in Sabzevar County, Razavi Khorasan province, Iran.

== Demographics ==
=== Population ===
At the time of the 2006 National Census, the village's population was 619 in 200 households. The following census in 2011 counted 575 people in 198 households. The 2016 census measured the population of the village as 426 people in 175 households.
