= Delqand =

Village in Razavi Khorasan province, Iran

Delqand Persian: دلقند
- Village
- Location within Iran
- Coordinates: 36°11′35″N 57°44′48″E
- Country: Iran
- Province: Razavi Khorasan
- County: Sabzevar
- District: Central
- Rural District: Qasabeh-ye Sharqi

Population (2016)
  - Total: 316
- Time zone: UTC+3:30 (IRST)

Delqand (Persian: دلقند) is a village in Qasabeh-ye Sharqi Rural District of the Central District in Sabzevar County, Razavi Khorasan province, Iran.

== Demographics ==
=== Population ===
At the time of the 2006 National Census, the village's population was 346 in 99 households. The following census in 2011 counted 354 people in 113 households. The 2016 census measured the population of the village as 316 people in 105 households.
