= Hashemabad, Sabzevar =

Village in Razavi Khorasan province, Iran

Hashemabad Persian: هاشم اباد
- Village
- Location within Iran
- Coordinates: 36°09′59″N 57°58′29″E
- Country: Iran
- Province: Razavi Khorasan
- County: Sabzevar
- District: Central
- Rural District: Robat

Population (2016)
  - Total: 544
- Time zone: UTC+3:30 (IRST)

Hashemabad (Persian: هاشم اباد) (Note: Also romanized as Hāshemābād) is a village in Robat Rural District of the Central District in Sabzevar County, Razavi Khorasan province, Iran.

== Demographics ==
=== Population ===
At the time of the 2006 National Census, the village's population was 525 in 161 households. The following census in 2011 counted 519 people in 184 households. The 2016 census measured the population of the village as 544 people in 186 households.
