= Nazlabad =

Village in Razavi Khorasan province, Iran

Nazlabad Persian: نزل اباد
- Village
- Location within Iran
- Coordinates: 36°11′28″N 57°49′06″E
- Country: Iran
- Province: Razavi Khorasan
- County: Sabzevar
- District: Central
- Rural District: Robat

Population (2016)
  - Total: 344
- Time zone: UTC+3:30 (IRST)

Nazlabad (Persian: نزل اباد) (Note: Also romanized as Nazlābād) is a village in Robat Rural District of the Central District in Sabzevar County, Razavi Khorasan province, Iran.

== Demographics ==
=== Population ===
At the time of the 2006 National Census, the village's population was 458 in 153 households. The following census in 2011 counted 376 people in 141 households. The 2016 census measured the population of the village as 344 people in 144 households.
