= Aliabad-e Shur, Sabzevar =

Village in Razavi Khorasan province, Iran

Aliabad-e Shur Persian: علي ابادشور
- Village
- Location within Iran
- Coordinates: 36°06′10″N 57°46′52″E
- Country: Iran
- Province: Razavi Khorasan
- County: Sabzevar
- District: Central
- Rural District: Qasabeh-ye Sharqi

Population (2016)
  - Total: 468
- Time zone: UTC+3:30 (IRST)

Aliabad-e Shur (Persian: علي ابادشور) (Note: Also romanized as ‘Alīābād-e Shūr) is a village in Qasabeh-ye Sharqi Rural District of the Central District in Sabzevar County, Razavi Khorasan province, Iran.

== Demographics ==
=== Population ===
At the time of the 2006 National Census, the village's population was 506 in 154 households. The following census in 2011 counted 475 people in 158 households. The 2016 census measured the population of the village as 468 people in 160 households.
