= Estir =

Village in Razavi Khorasan province, Iran

Estir Persian: استير
- Village
- Location within Iran
- Coordinates: 36°12′49″N 57°30′00″E
- Country: Iran
- Province: Razavi Khorasan
- County: Sabzevar
- District: Central
- Rural District: Qasabeh-ye Gharbi

Population (2016)
  - Total: 632
- Time zone: UTC+3:30 (IRST)

Estir (Persian: استير) (Note: Also romanized as Estīr; also known as Sūder) is a village in Qasabeh-ye Gharbi Rural District of the Central District in Sabzevar County, Razavi Khorasan province, Iran.

== Etymology ==
Estir was a Jewish village that had been named after Esther, the Jewish queen of the Persian king Xerxes I.

== Demographics ==
=== Population ===
At the time of the 2006 National Census, the village's population was 781 in 258 households. The following census in 2011 counted 757 people in 252 households. The 2016 census measured the population of the village as 632 people in 228 households.
