= Dowlatabad, Sabzevar =

Village in Razavi Khorasan province, Iran

Dowlatabad Persian: دولت اباد
- Village
- Location within Iran
- Coordinates: 36°08′05″N 57°43′54″E
- Country: Iran
- Province: Razavi Khorasan
- County: Sabzevar
- District: Central
- Rural District: Qasabeh-ye Sharqi

Population (2016)
  - Total: 1,217
- Time zone: UTC+3:30 (IRST)

Dowlatabad (Persian: دولت اباد) (Note: Also romanized as Dowlatābād; also known as Daulatābād) is a village in Qasabeh-ye Sharqi Rural District of the Central District in Sabzevar County, Razavi Khorasan province, Iran.

== Demographics ==
=== Population ===
At the time of the 2006 National Census, the village's population was 1,220 in 324 households. The following census in 2011 counted 1,134 people in 341 households. The 2016 census measured the population of the village as 1,217 people in 373 households.
