= Salehabad-e Bozorg =

Village in Razavi Khorasan province, Iran

Salehabad-e Bozorg Persian: صالح ابادبزرگ
- Village
- Location within Iran
- Coordinates: 36°09′21″N 58°00′24″E
- Country: Iran
- Province: Razavi Khorasan
- County: Sabzevar
- District: Central
- Rural District: Robat

Population (2016)
  - Total: 300
- Time zone: UTC+3:30 (IRST)

Salehabad-e Bozorg (Persian: صالح ابادبزرگ) (Note: Also romanized as Şāleḩābād-e Bozorg) is a village in Robat Rural District of the Central District in Sabzevar County, Razavi Khorasan province, Iran.

== Demographics ==
=== Population ===
At the time of the 2006 National Census, the village's population was 343 in 95 households. The following census in 2011 counted 304 people in 91 households. The 2016 census measured the population of the village as 300 people in 96 households.
