= Qaz =

Village in Razavi Khorasan province, Iran

Qaz Persian: قز
- Village
- Location within Iran
- Coordinates: 36°21′24″N 57°37′33″E
- Country: Iran
- Province: Razavi Khorasan
- County: Sabzevar
- District: Central
- Rural District: Karrab

Population (2016)
  - Total: 195
- Time zone: UTC+3:30 (IRST)

Qaz (Persian: قز) is a village in Karrab Rural District of the Central District in Sabzevar County, Razavi Khorasan province, Iran.

== Demographics ==
=== Population ===
At the time of the 2006 National Census, the village's population was 377 in 126 households. The following census in 2011 counted 268 people in 102 households. The 2016 census measured the population of the village as 195 people in 93 households.
