= Now Deh-e Sorsoreh =

Village in Razavi Khorasan province, Iran

Now Deh-e Sorsoreh Persian: نوده صرصره
- Village
- Location within Iran
- Coordinates: 36°19′24″N 57°25′52″E
- Country: Iran
- Province: Razavi Khorasan
- County: Sabzevar
- District: Central
- Rural District: Karrab

Population (2016)
  - Total: 154
- Time zone: UTC+3:30 (IRST)

Now Deh-e Sorsoreh (Persian: نوده صرصره) (Note: Also romanized as Now Deh-e Sar Sareh and Now Deh-e Şorşoreh; also known as Naudeh and Now Deh) is a village in Karrab Rural District of the Central District in Sabzevar County, Razavi Khorasan province, Iran.

== Demographics ==
=== Population ===
At the time of the 2006 National Census, the village's population was 59 in 22 households. The following census in 2011 counted 10 people in four households. The 2016 census measured the population of the village as 154 people in 56 households.
