= Jollain =

Jollain may refer to:

- Jollain (engravers), a family of French engravers
- Nicolas-René Jollain (1732–1804), a French painter

== See also ==
- Jollain-Merlin, a district in Brunehaut, France
- Jolleyn, a village in Robat, Iran
