= Sang-e Kelidar =

Village in Razavi Khorasan province, Iran

Sang-e Kelidar Persian: سنگ كليدر
- Village
- Location within Iran
- Coordinates: 36°09′23″N 58°15′08″E
- Country: Iran
- Province: Razavi Khorasan
- County: Sabzevar
- District: Central
- Rural District: Robat

Population (2016)
  - Total: 302
- Time zone: UTC+3:30 (IRST)

Sang-e Kelidar (Persian: سنگ كليدر) (Note: Also romanized as Sang-e Kalidar, Sang-e Kalīdar, and Sang-e Kelīdar; also known as Dehneh Ārbāb (دهنه ارباب)) is a village in Robat Rural District of the Central District in Sabzevar County, Razavi Khorasan province, Iran.

== Demographics ==
=== Population ===
At the time of the 2006 National Census, the village's population was 479 in 140 households. The following census in 2011 counted 448 people in 136 households. The 2016 census measured the population of the village as 302 people in 104 households.
