= Azad Manjir =

Village in Razavi Khorasan province, Iran

Azad Manjir Persian: ازادمنجير
- Village
- Location within Iran
- Coordinates: 36°11′47″N 57°47′51″E
- Country: Iran
- Province: Razavi Khorasan
- County: Sabzevar
- District: Central
- Rural District: Robat

Population (2016)
  - Total: 328
- Time zone: UTC+3:30 (IRST)

Azad Manjir (Persian: ازادمنجير) (Note: Also romanized as Āzād Manjīr; also known as Āzār Matjīr) is a village in Robat Rural District of the Central District in Sabzevar County, Razavi Khorasan province, Iran.

== Demographics ==
=== Population ===
At the time of the 2006 National Census, the village's population was 422 in 133 households. The following census in 2011 counted 395 people in 125 households. The 2016 census measured the population of the village as 328 people in 122 households.
