= Najmabad, Sabzevar =

Village in Razavi Khorasan province, Iran

Najmabad Persian: نجم اباد
- Village
- Location within Iran
- Coordinates: 36°15′47″N 57°58′48″E
- Country: Iran
- Province: Razavi Khorasan
- County: Sabzevar
- District: Central
- Rural District: Robat

Population (2016)
  - Total: 532
- Time zone: UTC+3:30 (IRST)

Najmabad (Persian: نجم اباد) (Note: Also romanized as Najmābād) is a village in Robat Rural District of the Central District in Sabzevar County, Razavi Khorasan province, Iran.

== Demographics ==
=== Population ===
At the time of the 2006 National Census, the village's population was 290 in 70 households. The following census in 2011 counted 414 people in 107 households. The 2016 census measured the population of the village as 532 people in 146 households.
