= Delbar, Iran =

Village in Razavi Khorasan province, Iran

Delbar Persian: دلبر
- Village
- Location within Iran
- Coordinates: 36°21′29″N 57°28′12″E
- Country: Iran
- Province: Razavi Khorasan
- County: Sabzevar
- District: Central
- Rural District: Karrab

Population (2016)
  - Total: 89
- Time zone: UTC+3:30 (IRST)

Delbar (Persian: دلبر) is a village in Karrab Rural District of the Central District in Sabzevar County, Razavi Khorasan province, Iran.

== Demographics ==
=== Population ===
At the time of the 2006 National Census, the village's population was 194 in 75 households. The following census in 2011 counted 230 people in 82 households. The 2016 census measured the population of the village as 89 people in 46 households.
