= Afchang =

Village in Razavi Khorasan province, Iran

Afchang Persian: افچنگ
- Village
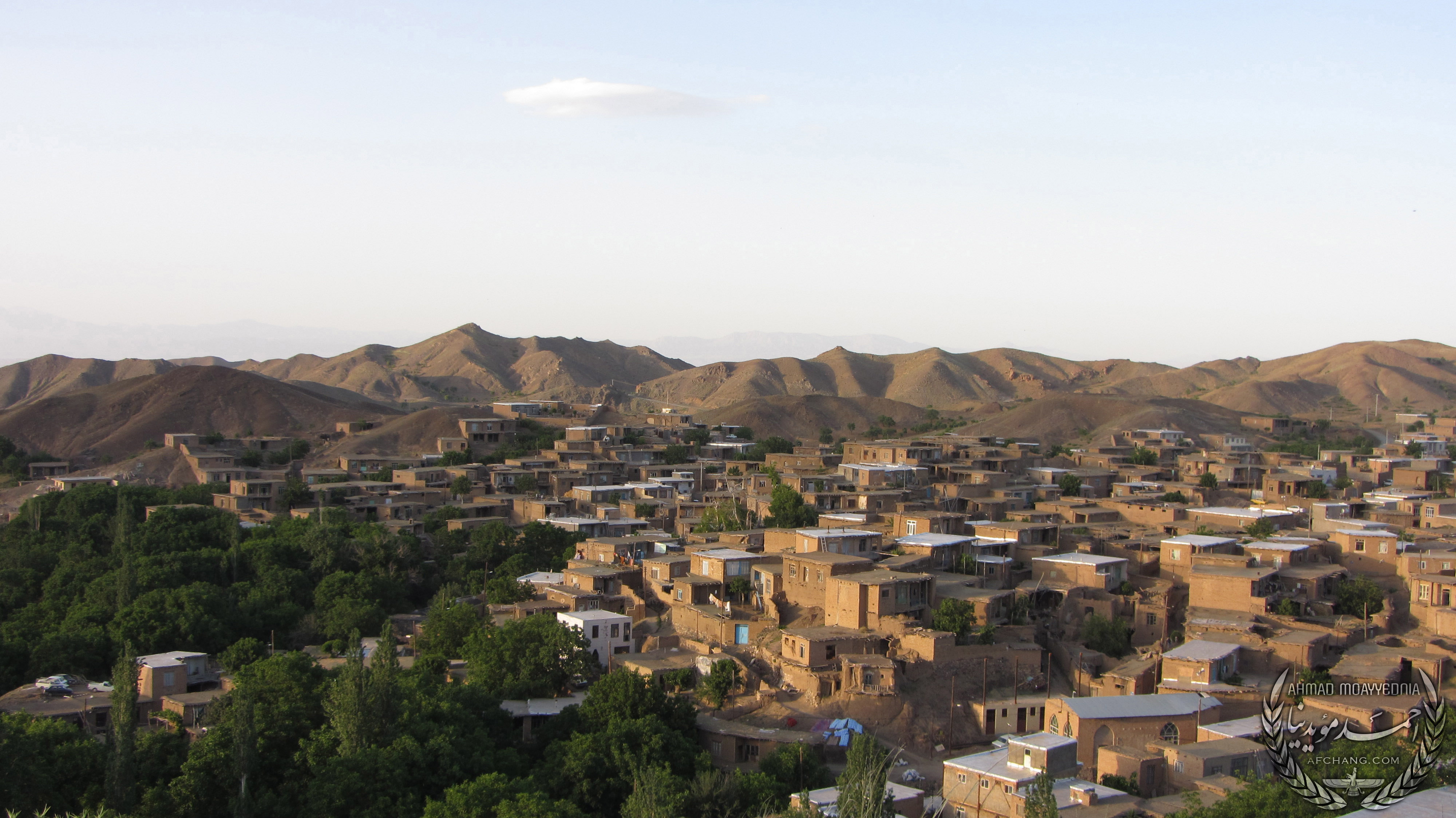
- The village of Afchang

- Location within Iran
- Coordinates: 36°24′28″N 57°38′21″E
- Country: Iran
- Province: Razavi Khorasan
- County: Sabzevar
- District: Central
- Rural District: Karrab

Population (2016)
  - Total: 842
- Time zone: UTC+3:30 (IRST)

Afchang (Persian: افچنگ) is a village in Karrab Rural District of the Central District in Sabzevar County, Razavi Khorasan province, Iran.

== Demographics ==
=== Population ===
At the time of the 2006 National Census, the village's population was 1,598 in 441 households. The following census in 2011 counted 1,134 people in 406 households. The 2016 census measured the population of the village as 842 people in 335 households, the most populous in its rural district.
