= Belashabad =

Village in Razavi Khorasan province, Iran

Belashabad Persian: بلاش اباد
- Village
- Location within Iran
- Coordinates: 36°22′02″N 57°32′17″E
- Country: Iran
- Province: Razavi Khorasan
- County: Sabzevar
- District: Central
- Rural District: Karrab

Population (2016)
  - Total: 202
- Time zone: UTC+3:30 (IRST)

Belashabad (Persian: بلاش اباد) (Note: Also romanized as Belāshābād; also known as Bāleshābād and Malāshābād) is a village in, and the capital of, Karrab Rural District in the Central District of Sabzevar County, Razavi Khorasan province, Iran.

== Demographics ==
=== Population ===
At the time of the 2006 National Census, the village's population was 258 in 115 households. The following census in 2011 counted 202 people in 97 households. The 2016 census measured the population of the village as 202 people in 109 households.
