= Kohneh Ab =

Village in Razavi Khorasan province, Iran

Kohneh Ab Persian: كهنه اب
- Village
- Location within Iran
- Coordinates: 36°13′19″N 57°38′53″E
- Country: Iran
- Province: Razavi Khorasan
- County: Sabzevar
- District: Central
- Rural District: Qasabeh-ye Gharbi

Population (2016)
  - Total: 1,447
- Time zone: UTC+3:30 (IRST)

Kohneh Ab (Persian: كهنه اب) (Note: Also romanized as Kohneh Āb) is a village in Qasabeh-ye Gharbi Rural District of the Central District in Sabzevar County, Razavi Khorasan province, Iran.

== Demographics ==
=== Population ===
At the time of the 2006 National Census, the village's population was 199 in 53 households. The following census in 2011 counted 962 people in 297 households. The 2016 census measured the population of the village as 1,447 people in 418 households.
