= Raz Qand =

Village in Razavi Khorasan province, Iran

Raz Qand Persian: رازقند
- Village
- Location within Iran
- Coordinates: 36°19′02″N 57°42′38″E
- Country: Iran
- Province: Razavi Khorasan
- County: Sabzevar
- District: Central
- Rural District: Qasabeh-ye Sharqi

Population (2016)
  - Total: 218
- Time zone: UTC+3:30 (IRST)

Raz Qand (Persian: رازقند) (Note: Also romanized as Rāz Qand) is a village in Qasabeh-ye Sharqi Rural District of the Central District in Sabzevar County, Razavi Khorasan province, Iran.

== Demographics ==
=== Population ===
At the time of the 2006 National Census, the village's population was 268 in 90 households. The following census in 2011 counted 228 people in 91 households. The 2016 census measured the population of the village as 218 people in 90 households.
