= Abaresh =

Village in Razavi Khorasan province, Iran

Abaresh Persian: ابارش
- Village
- Location within Iran
- Coordinates: 36°12′59″N 57°37′03″E
- Country: Iran
- Province: Razavi Khorasan
- County: Sabzevar
- District: Central
- Rural District: Qasabeh-ye Gharbi

Population (2016)
  - Total: 1,497
- Time zone: UTC+3:30 (IRST)

Abaresh (Persian: ابارش) (Note: Also romanized as Abāresh) is a village in Qasabeh-ye Gharbi Rural District of the Central District in Sabzevar County, Razavi Khorasan province, Iran.

== Demographics ==
=== Population ===
At the time of the 2006 National Census, the village's population was 1,104 in 313 households. The following census in 2011 counted 1,396 people in 430 households. The 2016 census measured the population of the village as 1,497 people in 425 households, the most populous in its rural district.
