= Shareh, Razavi Khorasan =

Village in Razavi Khorasan province, Iran

Shareh Persian: شاره
- Village
- Location within Iran
- Coordinates: 36°22′54″N 57°25′11″E
- Country: Iran
- Province: Razavi Khorasan
- County: Sabzevar
- District: Central
- Rural District: Karrab

Population (2016)
  - Total: 74
- Time zone: UTC+3:30 (IRST)

Shareh (Persian: شاره) (Note: Also romanized as Shārah and Shāreh) is a village in Karrab Rural District of the Central District in Sabzevar County, Razavi Khorasan province, Iran.

== Demographics ==
=== Population ===
At the time of the 2006 National Census, the village's population was 216 in 81 households. The following census in 2011 counted 105 people in 47 households. The 2016 census measured the population of the village as 74 people in 38 households.
