= Binalood Wind Farm =

Wind farm in Iran

Binalood wind farm
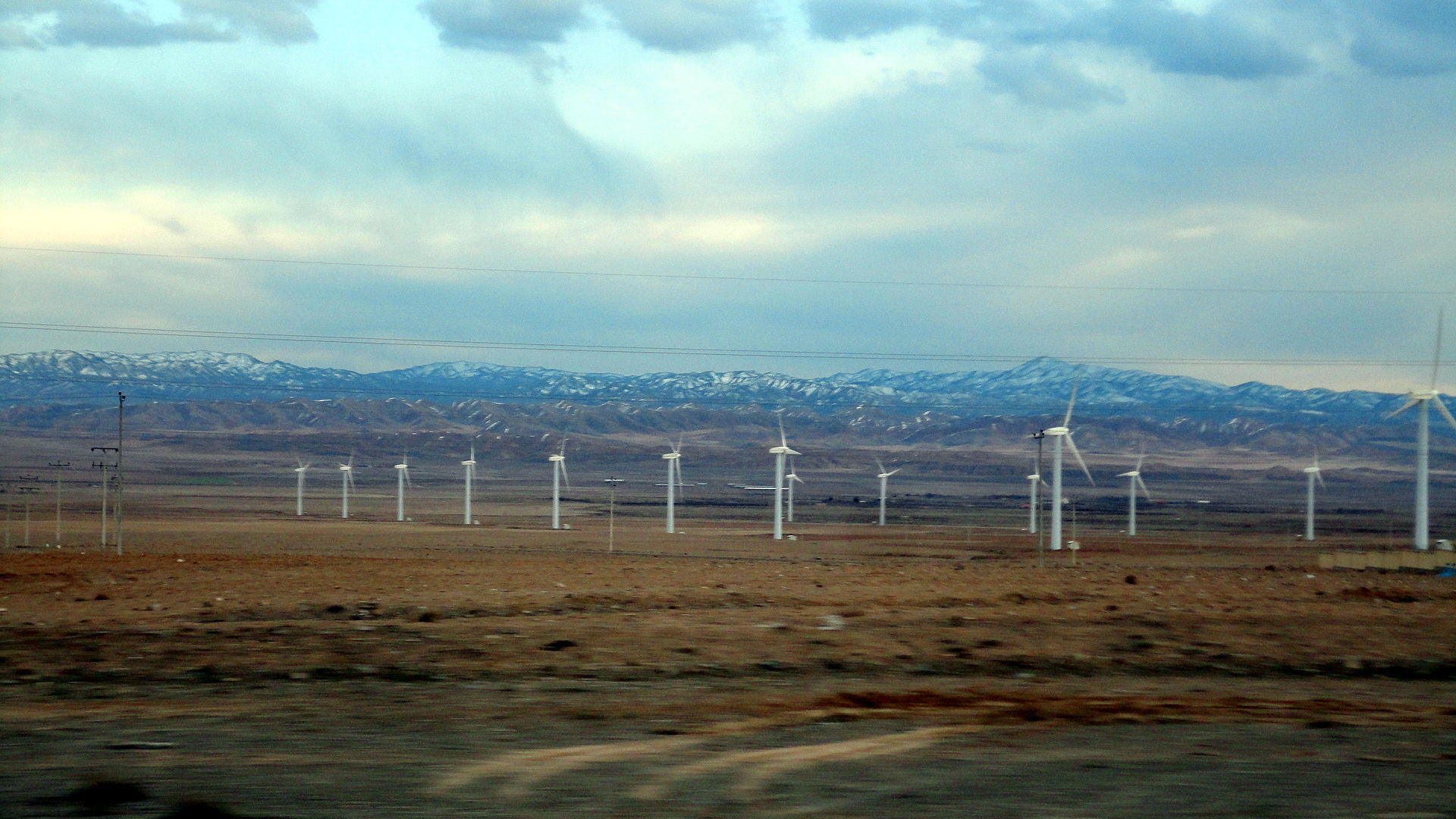
- Official name: نیروگاه بادی بینالود
- Country: Iran
- Location: Nishapur, Razavi Khorasan Province
- Coordinates: 35°59′31″N 59°23′18″E
- Status: Active
- Commission date: 2008

Wind farm
- Type: Onshore

Power generation
- Units operational: 43 X 0.66 MW
- Nameplate capacity: 28.2 MW; Planned: 61.2 MW

External links
- Website: https://binaloodwf.com/?lang=en

Binalood wind farm is a wind farm situated in Razavi Khorasan Province of Iran near the city of Nishapur. It currently uses 43 turbines with a generating capacity of 660 kW to produce 28.2 MW of electricity using wind power. The area of the farm is over 700 hectares (1,700 acres). The project was initiated in 2002 and the farm came online in 2008. The plant was built by Renewable energy organization of Iran. The plant is currently being expanded by adding 50 more turbines, each with a capacity of 660 kW, increasing its total capacity to 61.2 MW.

== See also ==
- Wind power in Iran
- Manjil and Rudbar Wind Farm
- Iran–Armenia Wind Farm
- List of power stations in Iran
