= Manjil and Rudbar Wind Farm =

Wind farm in Gilan, Iran

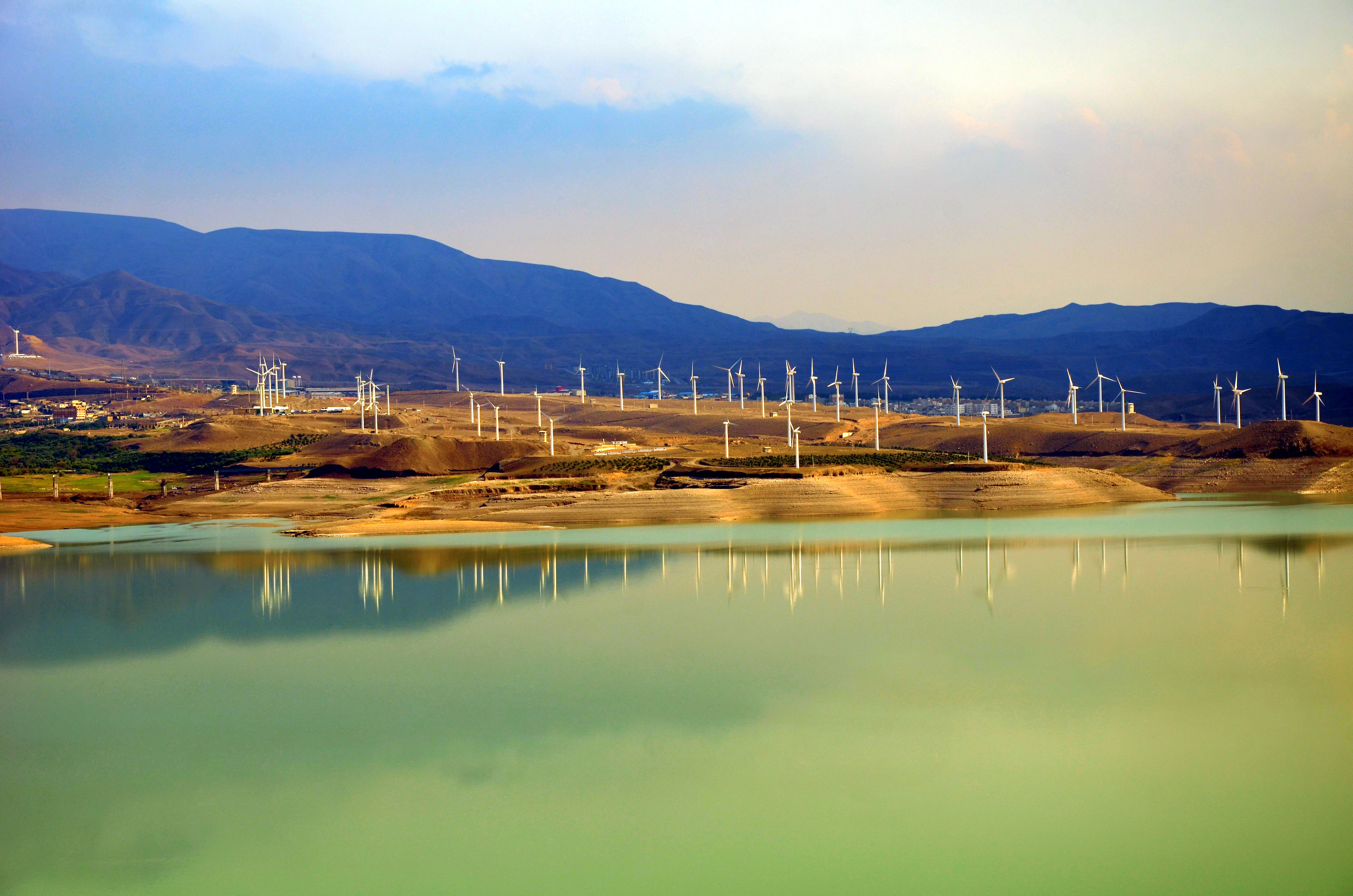
- A view of Manjil wind farm
- Country: Iran
- Location: Gilan
- Coordinates: 36°44′04″N 49°23′39″E
- Status: Operational
- Commission date: 2009

Wind farm
- Type: Onshore
- Rated wind speed: 8.5m/s
- Site elevation: 300m

Power generation
- Units operational: 171
- Make and model: NEG Micon; Vestas; Machine Sazi Arak (manufacturer)
- Nameplate capacity: 87.34 MW
- Capacity factor: 0.45

External links
- Commons: Related media on Commons

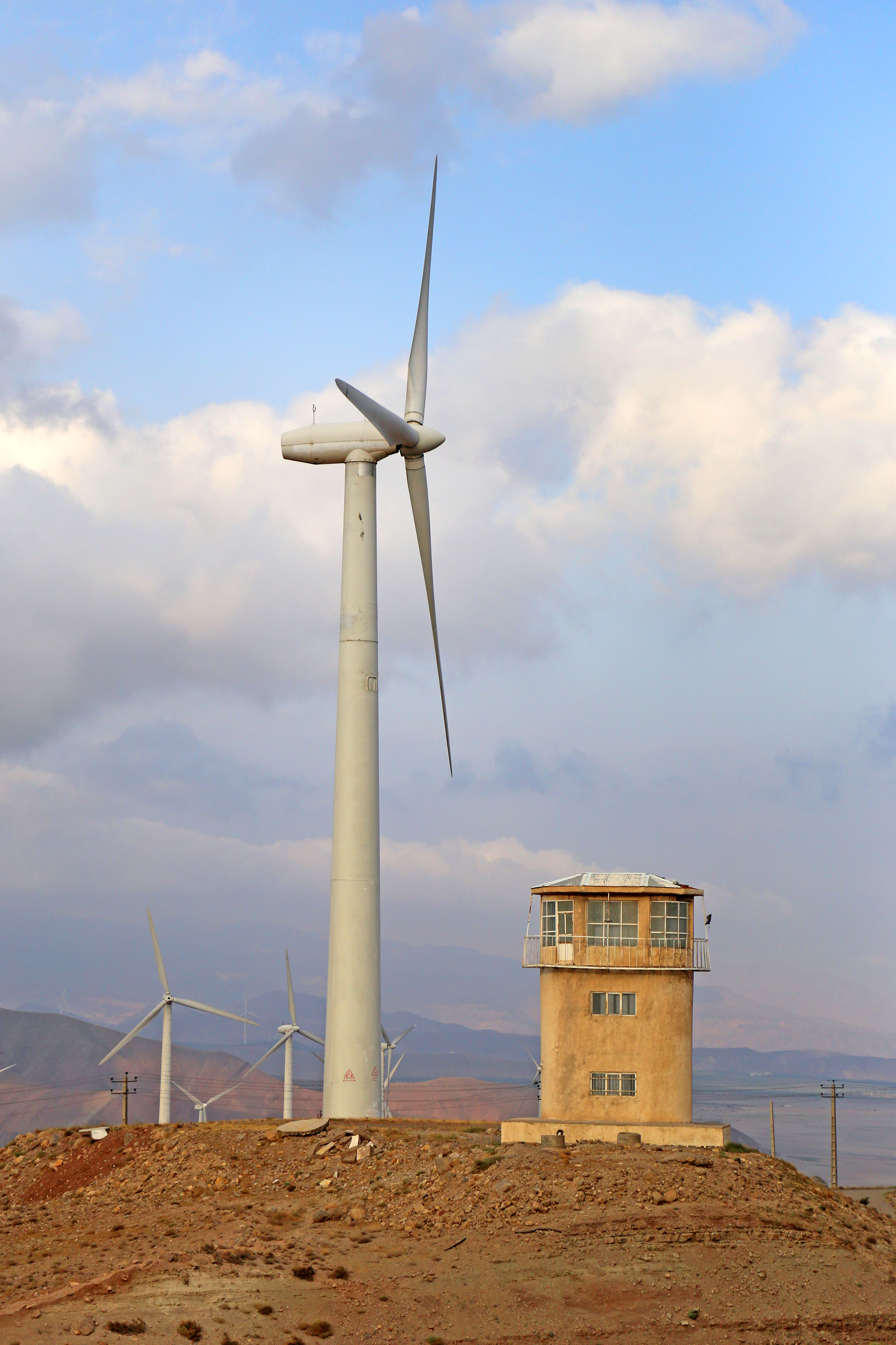
Manjil Wind Turbines

Manjil, Harzvil, Siahpoush and Rudbar Wind Farms are wind farms located in Gilan, Iran. In 1995 the Iranian governors decided to use renewable energies in Iran and started to develop wind farms in Manjil area. They start with installing a Nord Tank NTK-500/37 wind turbine. They added other products of Nordtank such as NTK-300/35 and NTK-550/42. The developer was Iran Renewable energies organization (SUNA) as representative of TAVANIR, and they chose Saba-Niroo as Iranian manufacturer to produce wind turbines in Iran. Saba-Niroo signed a joint venture agreement with Vestas to produce V47-660/45 in Iran. Moshanir power engineering consultants were the consultants of the project. Finally, the project finished in February 2015. Due to the privatization policy, TAVANIR established Manjil green power Generation company and transferred all of his ownership on the mentioned power plant to this company. The company transferred to Omid Taban Hour Energy Management company on February 22, 2018. The total installed wind turbines in this project are as below:

- Roudbar wind farm 4 units WTG with total capacity 2.15 MW
- Harzevil wind farm 25 units WTG with total capacity 13.5 MW
- Manjil wind farm 52 units WTG with total capacity 28.37 MW
- Siahpoosh wind farm 69 units WTG with total capacity 48.18 MW

These farms include 150 units with total capacity of 92.2 MW.

== See also ==
- Wind power in Iran
- Binalood wind farm
- Iran–Armenia Wind Farm
- List of power stations in Iran

== Gallery ==
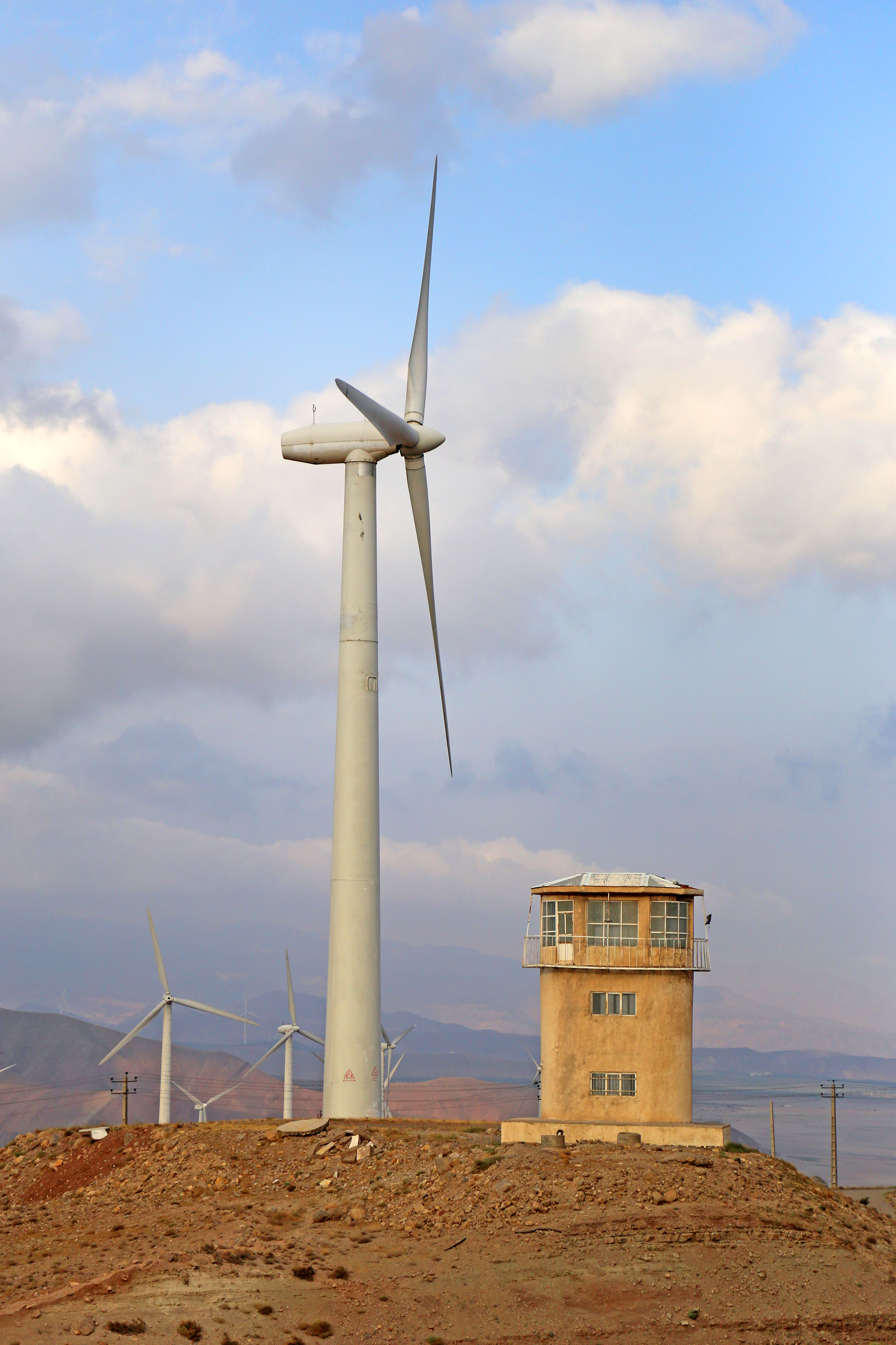
Manjil Wind Turbines

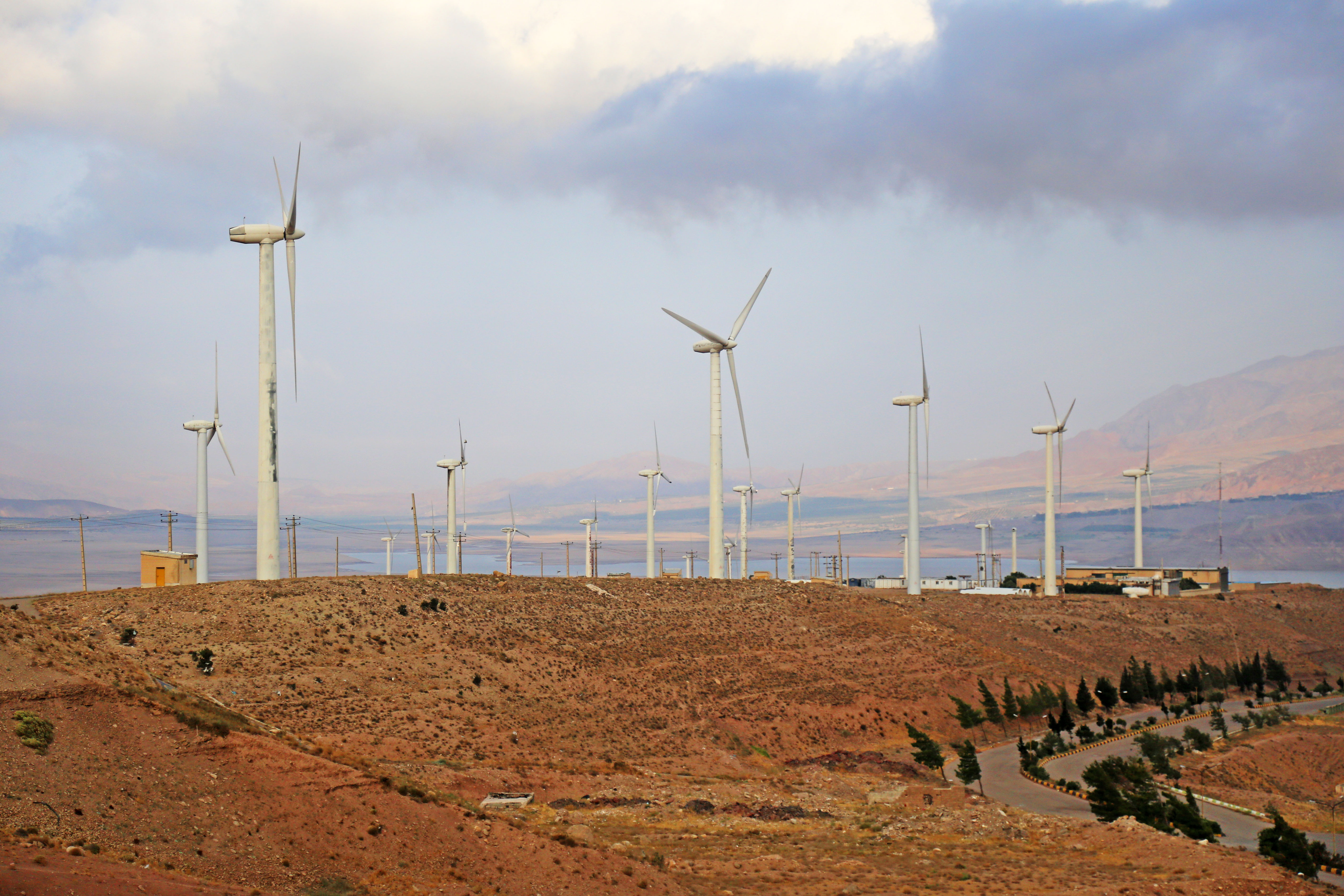
Manjil Wind Turbines

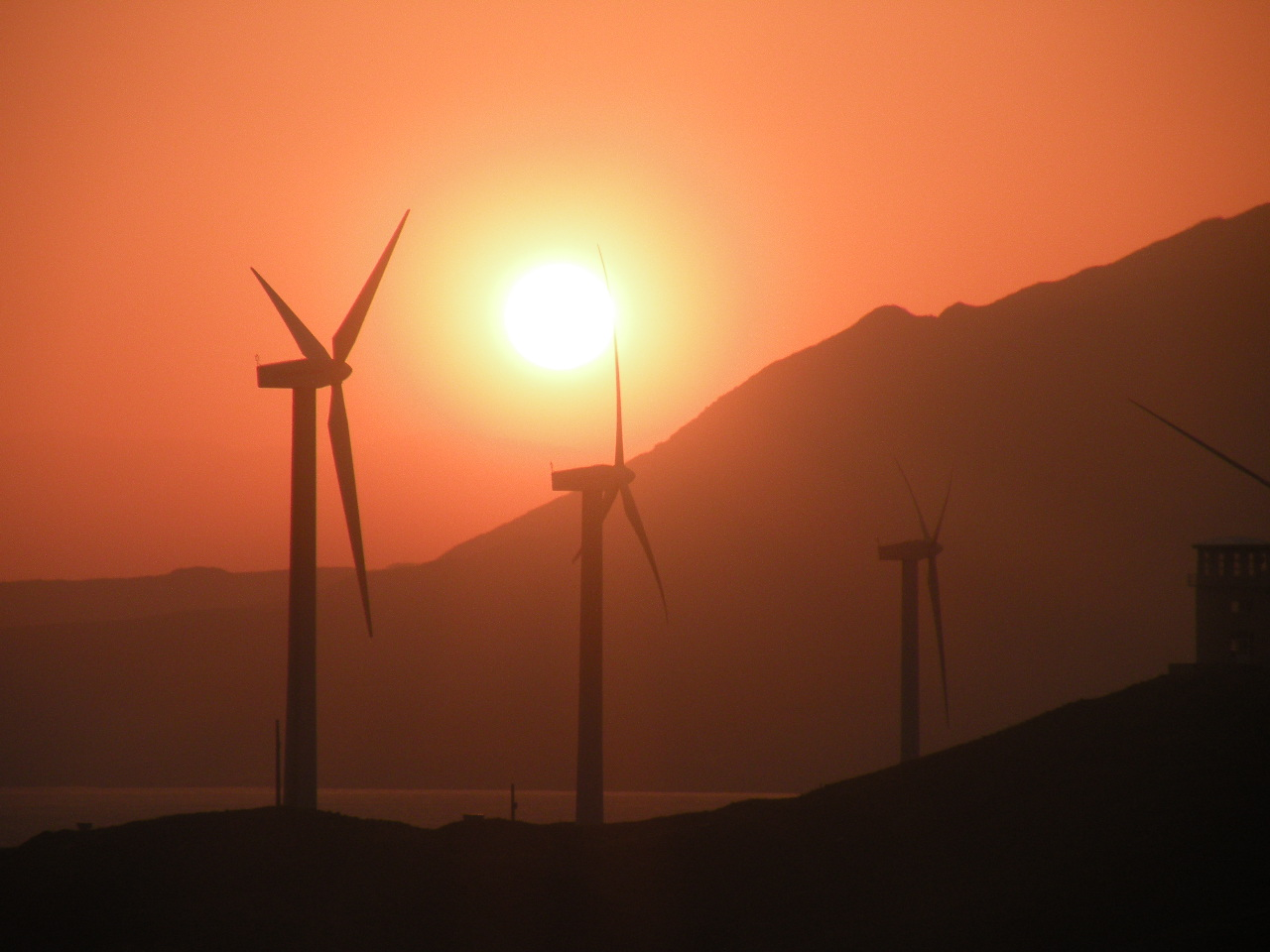

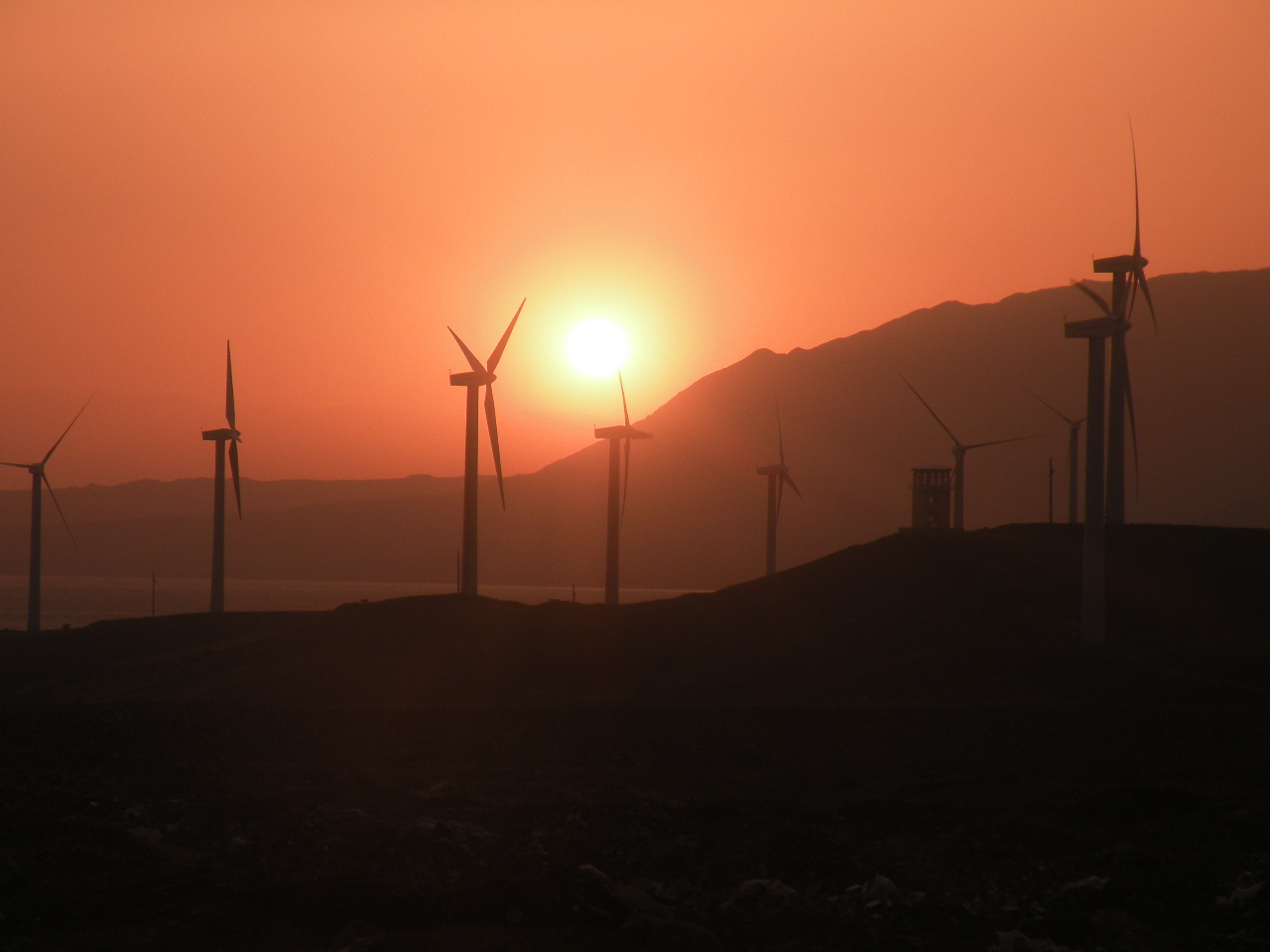

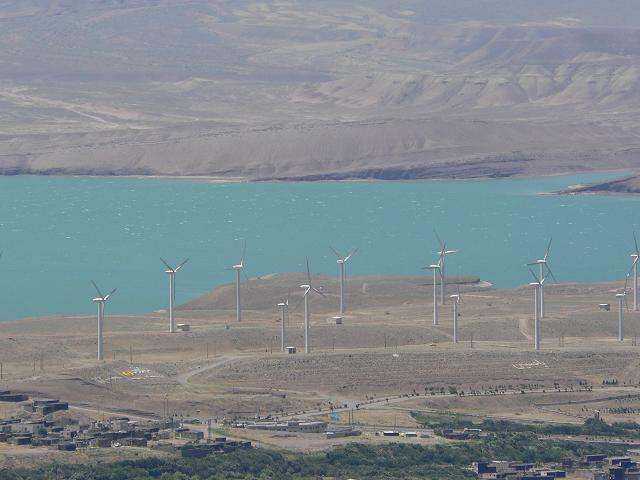

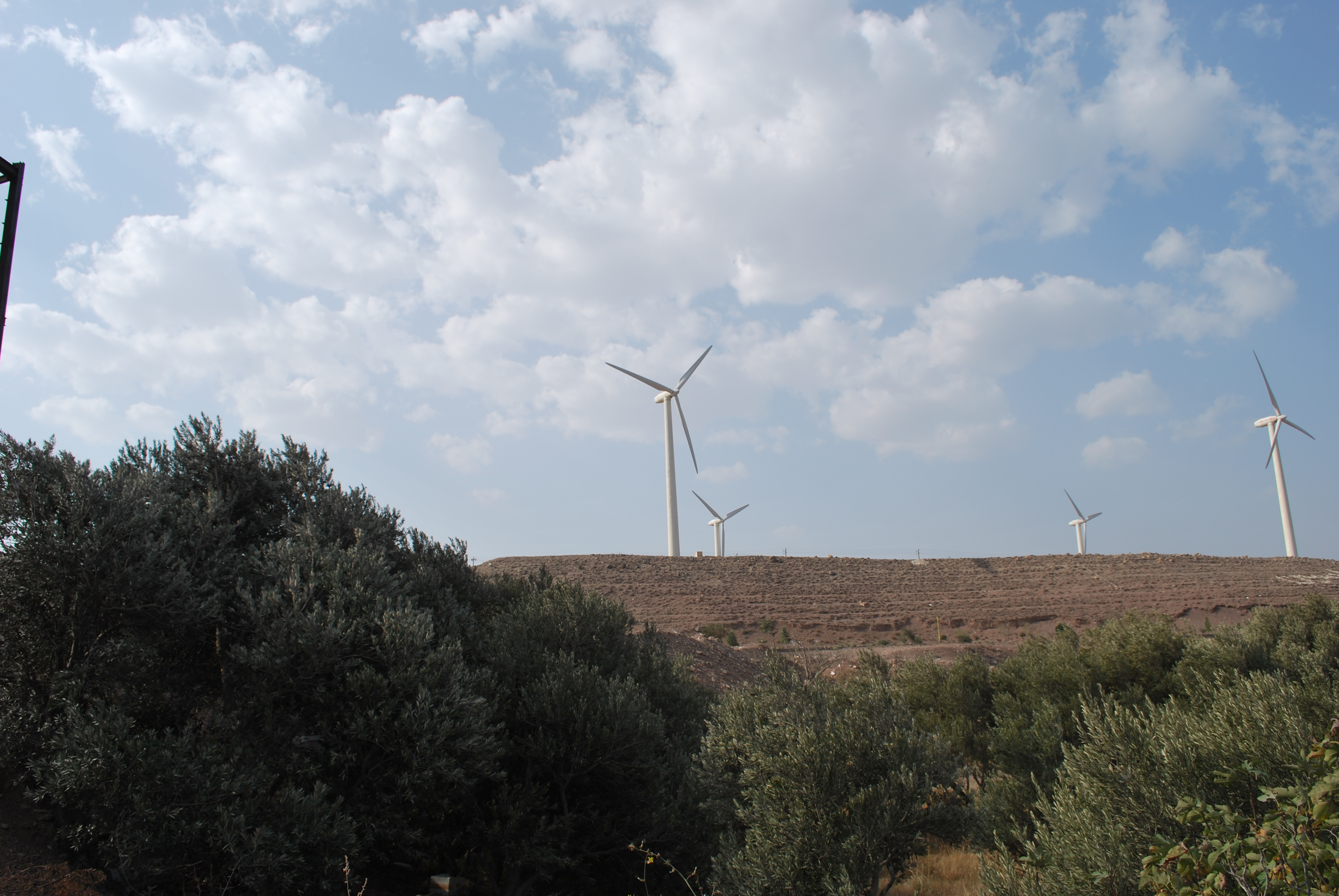

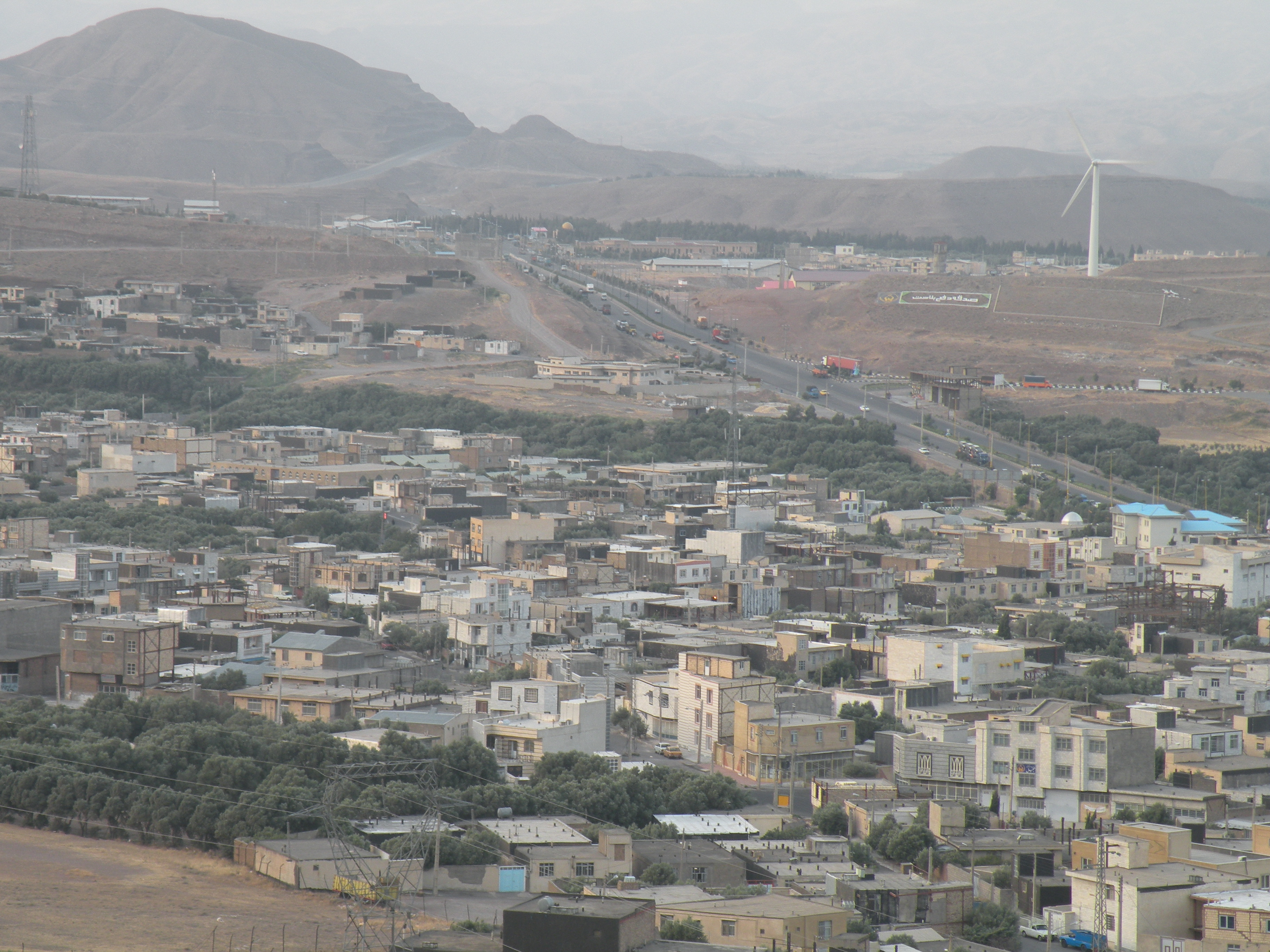

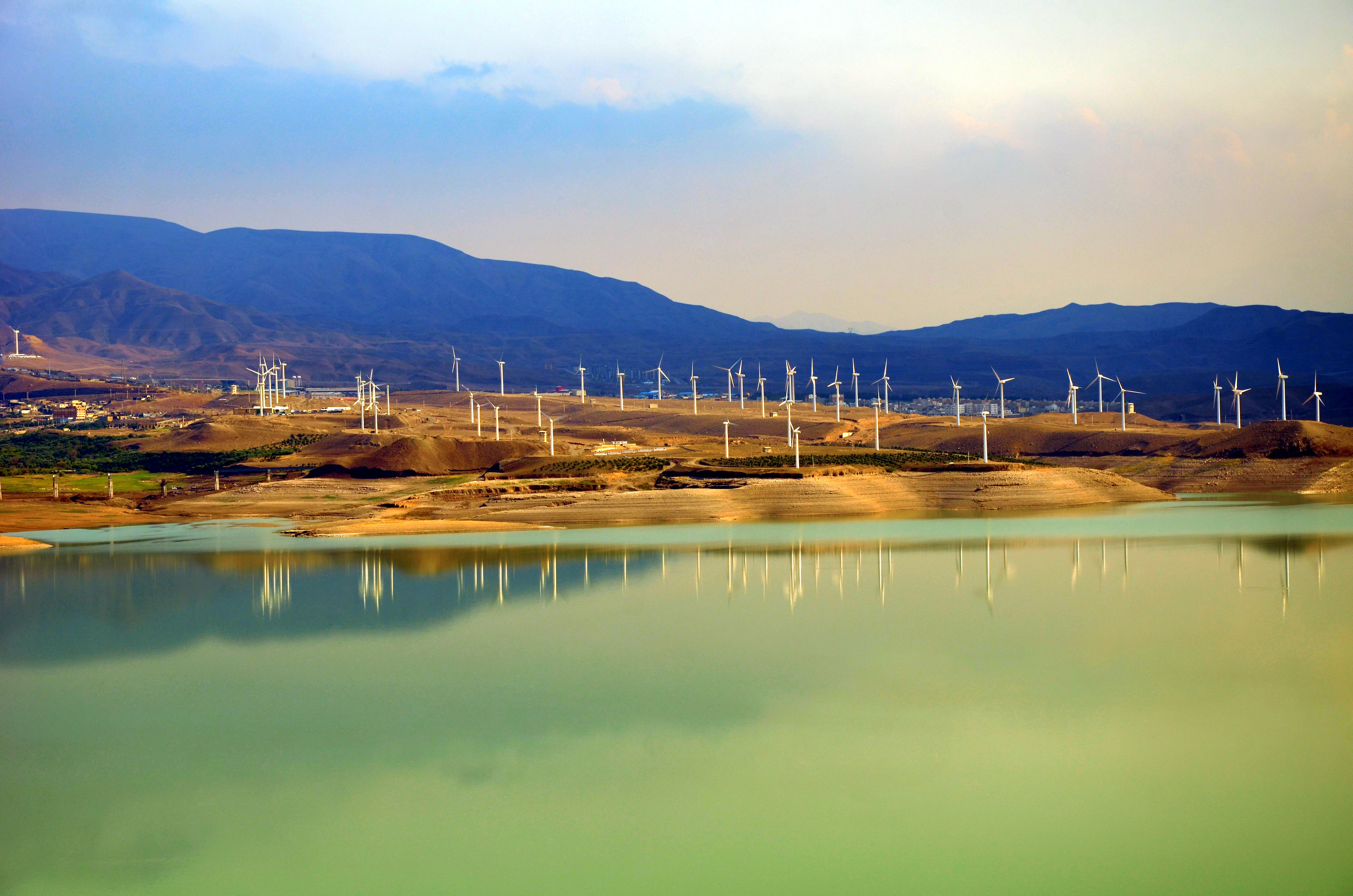

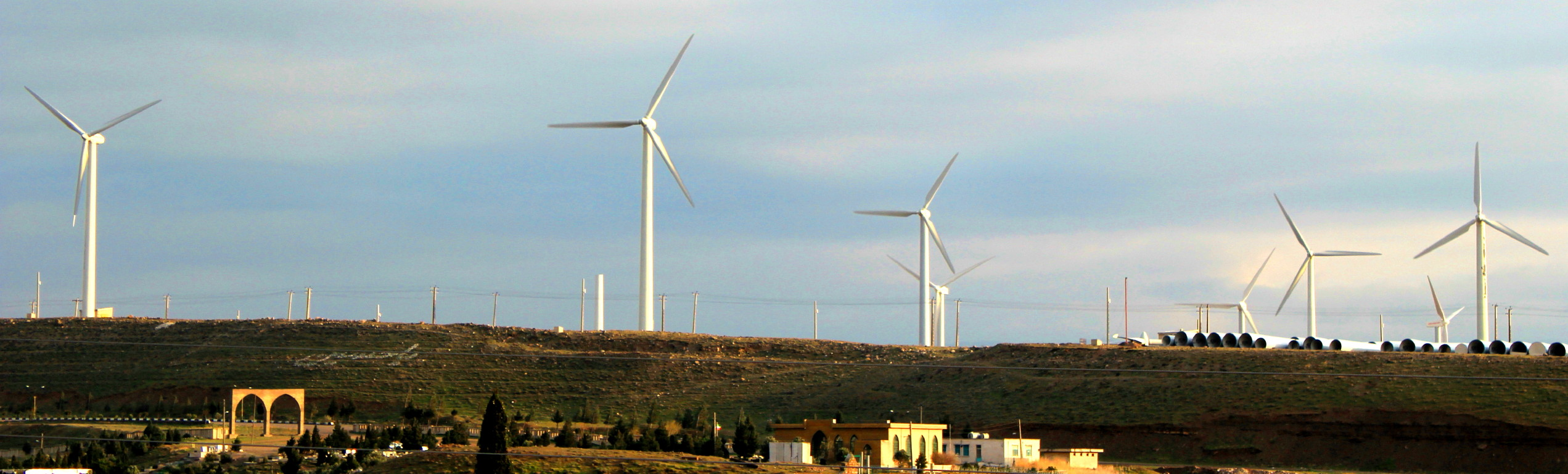
