= Baghjar =

Village in Razavi Khorasan province, Iran

Baghjar Persian: باغجر
- Village
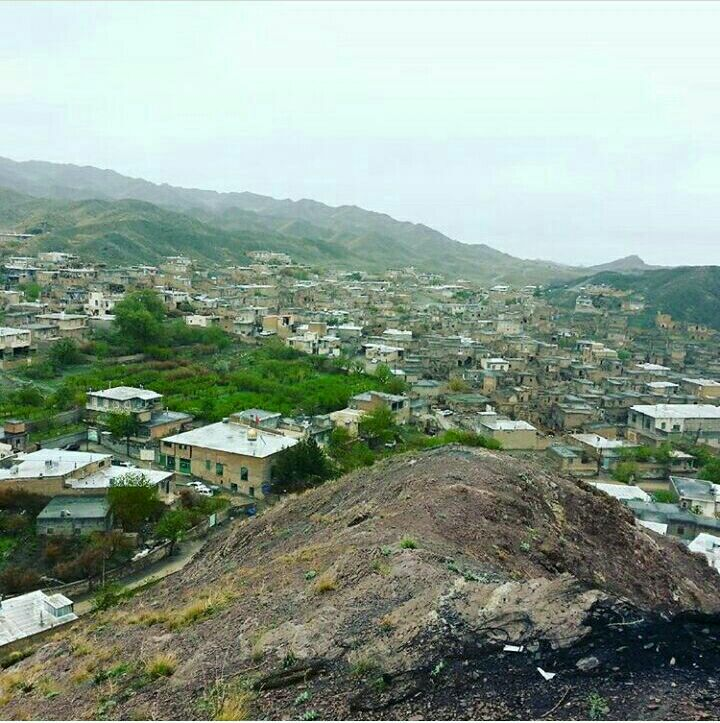
- The village of Baghjar

- Location within Iran
- Coordinates: 36°17′32″N 57°50′58″E
- Country: Iran
- Province: Razavi Khorasan
- County: Sabzevar
- District: Central
- Rural District: Qasabeh-ye Sharqi

Population (2016)
  - Total: 991
- Time zone: UTC+3:30 (IRST)

Baghjar (Persian: باغجر) (Note: Also romanized as Bāgh-e Jar and Bāghjar) is a village in Qasabeh-ye Sharqi Rural District of the Central District in Sabzevar County, Razavi Khorasan province, Iran.

== Demographics ==
=== Population ===
At the time of the 2006 National Census, the village's population was 1,511 in 365 households. The following census in 2011 counted 1,225 people in 371 households. The 2016 census measured the population of the village as 991 people in 334 households.
