= Hoseynabad-e Ganji =

Village in Razavi Khorasan province, Iran

Hoseynabad-e Ganji Persian: حسين ابادگنجي
- Village
- Location within Iran
- Coordinates: 36°05′08″N 57°28′47″E
- Country: Iran
- Province: Razavi Khorasan
- County: Sabzevar
- District: Central
- Rural District: Qasabeh-ye Gharbi

Population (2016)
  - Total: 448
- Time zone: UTC+3:30 (IRST)

Hoseynabad-e Ganji (Persian: حسين ابادگنجي) (Note: Also romanized as Ḩoseynābād Ganjī and Ḩoseynābād-e Ganjī) is a village in Qasabeh-ye Gharbi Rural District of the Central District in Sabzevar County, Razavi Khorasan province, Iran.

== Demographics ==
=== Population ===
At the time of the 2006 National Census, the village's population was 369 in 102 households. The following census in 2011 counted 417 people in 115 households. The 2016 census measured the population of the village as 448 people in 131 households.
