= Baghan, Razavi Khorasan =

Village in Razavi Khorasan province, Iran

Baghan Persian: باغان
- Village
- Location within Iran
- Coordinates: 36°11′26″N 57°45′51″E
- Country: Iran
- Province: Razavi Khorasan
- County: Sabzevar
- District: Central
- Rural District: Qasabeh-ye Sharqi

Population (2016)
  - Total: 249
- Time zone: UTC+3:30 (IRST)

Baghan (Persian: باغان) (Note: Also romanized as Bāghān) is a village in Qasabeh-ye Sharqi Rural District of the Central District in Sabzevar County, Razavi Khorasan province, Iran.

== Demographics ==
=== Population ===
At the time of the 2006 National Census, the village's population was 353 in 92 households. The following census in 2011 counted 258 people in 83 households. The 2016 census measured the population of the village as 249 people in 91 households.
