= Sedid, Razavi Khorasan =

Sedid سديد
- Village
- Location within Iran
- Coordinates: 36°19′20″N 57°38′35″E
- Country: Iran
- Province: Razavi Khorasan
- County: Sabzevar
- Bakhsh: Central
- Rural District: Qasabeh-ye Sharqi

Population (2006)
  - Total: 113
- Time zone: UTC+3:30 (IRST)
  - Summer (DST): UTC+4:30 (IRDT)

Sedid (Persian: سديد, also Romanized as Sedīd and Sadīd; also known as Sadit) is a village in Qasabeh-ye Sharqi Rural District, in the Central District of Sabzevar County, Razavi Khorasan Province, Iran. At the 2006 census, its population was 113, in 27 families.
