= Robati-ye Shazdeh =

Robati-ye Shazdeh may refer to:

- Robati Gharbatha
- Robat-e Sar Push
