= Khosrowjerd =

Village in Razavi Khorasan province, Iran

Khosrowjerd Persian: خسروجرد
- Village
- Location within Iran
- Coordinates: 36°13′12″N 57°35′25″E
- Country: Iran
- Province: Razavi Khorasan
- County: Sabzevar
- District: Central
- Rural District: Qasabeh-ye Gharbi

Population (2016)
  - Total: 1,060
- Time zone: UTC+3:30 (IRST)

Khosrowjerd (Persian: خسروجرد) (Note: Also romanized as Khosrow Jerd; also known as Khosrow Gard Bāresh, Khosrow Gerd, Khosrow Gerd Abāresh, and Khusro Gird) is a village in, and the capital of, Qasabeh-ye Gharbi Rural District in the Central District of Sabzevar County, Razavi Khorasan province, Iran.

== Demographics ==
=== Population ===
At the time of the 2006 National Census, the village's population was 1,325 in 421 households. The following census in 2011 counted 1,259 people in 426 households. The 2016 census measured the population of the village as 1,060 people in 375 households.
