= Qareh Qoli =

Village in Razavi Khorasan province, Iran

Qareh Qoli Persian: قره قلي
- Village
- Location within Iran
- Coordinates: 36°16′29″N 57°53′23″E
- Country: Iran
- Province: Razavi Khorasan
- County: Sabzevar
- District: Central
- Rural District: Robat

Population (2016)
  - Total: 792
- Time zone: UTC+3:30 (IRST)

Qareh Qoli (Persian: قره قلي) (Note: Also romanized as Qareh Qolī; also known as Kalāteh-ye Qanbar Qarāqolī) is a village in Robat Rural District of the Central District in Sabzevar County, Razavi Khorasan province, Iran.

== Demographics ==
=== Population ===
At the time of the 2006 National Census, the village's population was 798 in 202 households. The following census in 2011 counted 828 people in 243 households. The 2016 census measured the population of the village as 792 people in 234 households.
