= Fasanqar =

Village in Razavi Khorasan province, Iran

Fasanqar Persian: فسنقر
- Village
- Location within Iran
- Coordinates: 36°06′13″N 57°33′48″E
- Country: Iran
- Province: Razavi Khorasan
- County: Sabzevar
- District: Central
- Rural District: Qasabeh-ye Gharbi

Population (2016)
  - Total: 922
- Time zone: UTC+3:30 (IRST)

Fasanqar (Persian: فسنقر) (Note: Also known as Posangar) is a village in Qasabeh-ye Gharbi Rural District of the Central District in Sabzevar County, Razavi Khorasan province, Iran.

== Demographics ==
=== Population ===
At the time of the 2006 National Census, the village's population was 1,119 in 319 households. The following census in 2011 counted 1,072 people in 343 households. The 2016 census measured the population of the village as 922 people in 312 households.
