= Izi, Razavi Khorasan =

Village in Razavi Khorasan province, Iran

Izi Persian: ايزي
- Village
- Location within Iran
- Coordinates: 36°13′29″N 57°43′38″E
- Country: Iran
- Province: Razavi Khorasan
- County: Sabzevar
- District: Central
- Rural District: Qasabeh-ye Sharqi

Population (2016)
  - Total: 2,486
- Time zone: UTC+3:30 (IRST)

Izi (Persian: ايزي) (Note: Also romanized as Īzī; also known as Deh Benām and Qal‘eh-ye Īzī) is a village in, and the capital of, Qasabeh-ye Sharqi Rural District in the Central District of Sabzevar County, Razavi Khorasan province, Iran.

== Demographics ==
=== Population ===
At the time of the 2006 National Census, the village's population was 2,132 in 624 households. The following census in 2011 counted 2,223 people in 716 households. The 2016 census measured the population of the village as 2,486 people in 778 households, the most populous in its rural district.
