= Borzu, Karrab =

Village in Razavi Khorasan province, Iran

Borzu Persian: برزو
- Village
- Location within Iran
- Coordinates: 36°21′30″N 57°34′42″E
- Country: Iran
- Province: Razavi Khorasan
- County: Sabzevar
- District: Central
- Rural District: Karrab

Population (2016)
  - Total: 82
- Time zone: UTC+3:30 (IRST)

Borzu (Persian: برزو) (Note: Also romanized as Borzū) is a village in Karrab Rural District of the Central District in Sabzevar County, Razavi Khorasan province, Iran.

== Demographics ==
=== Population ===
At the time of the 2006 National Census, the village's population was 127 in 47 households. The following census in 2011 counted 94 people in 36 households. The 2016 census measured the population of the village as 82 people in 37 households.
