= Beynaq, Razavi Khorasan =

Village in Razavi Khorasan province, Iran

Beynaq Persian: بينق
- Village
- Location within Iran
- Coordinates: 36°21′43″N 57°36′11″E
- Country: Iran
- Province: Razavi Khorasan
- County: Sabzevar
- District: Central
- Rural District: Karrab

Population (2016)
  - Total: 106
- Time zone: UTC+3:30 (IRST)

Beynaq (Persian: بينق) (Note: Also romanized as Beynoq; also known as Beyvnaq) is a village in Karrab Rural District of the Central District in Sabzevar County, Razavi Khorasan province, Iran.

== Demographics ==
=== Population ===
At the time of the 2006 National Census, the village's population was 18 in 10 households. The following census in 2011 counted 97 people in 41 households. The 2016 census measured the population of the village as 106 people in 45 households.
