= Jelin, Razavi Khorasan =

Village in Razavi Khorasan province, Iran

Jelin Persian: جلين
- Village
- Location within Iran
- Coordinates: 36°11′29″N 57°52′22″E
- Country: Iran
- Province: Razavi Khorasan
- County: Sabzevar
- District: Central
- Rural District: Robat

Population (2016)
  - Total: 440
- Time zone: UTC+3:30 (IRST)

Jelin (Persian: جلين) (Note: Also romanized as Jelīn, Jolīn, Jolleyn, Jolleyn, and Jollīn) is a village in Robat Rural District of the Central District in Sabzevar County, Razavi Khorasan province, Iran.

== Demographics ==
=== Population ===
At the time of the 2006 National Census, the village's population was 467 in 148 households. The following census in 2011 counted 404 people in 149 households. The 2016 census measured the population of the village as 440 people in 167 households.
