= Robat Rural District (Sabzevar County) =

Rural district in Razavi Khorasan province, Iran

Robat Rural District Persian: دهستان رباط
- Rural District
- Location within Iran
- Coordinates: 36°11′N 58°02′E
- Country: Iran
- Province: Razavi Khorasan
- County: Sabzevar
- District: Central
- Established: 1987
- Capital: Robat-e Sar Push

Population (2016)
  - Total: 5,751
- Time zone: UTC+3:30 (IRST)

Robat Rural District (Persian: دهستان رباط) is in the Central District of Sabzevar County, Razavi Khorasan province, Iran. Its capital is the village of Robat-e Sar Push.

== Demographics ==
=== Population ===
At the time of the 2006 National Census, the rural district's population was 5,872 in 1,684 households. There were 5,703 inhabitants in 1,754 households at the following census of 2011. The 2016 census measured the population of the rural district as 5,751 in 1,895 households. The most populous of its 38 villages was Robat-e Sar Push, with 1,360 people.

=== Other villages in the rural district ===
- Azad Manjir
- Hashemabad
- Jelin
- Najmabad
- Nazlabad
- Qareh Qoli
- Salehabad-e Bozorg
- Sang-e Kelidar
