= Borzu, Qasabeh-ye Gharbi =

Village in Razavi Khorasan province, Iran

Borzu Persian: برزو
- Village
- Location within Iran
- Coordinates: 36°05′36″N 57°31′19″E
- Country: Iran
- Province: Razavi Khorasan
- County: Sabzevar
- District: Central
- Rural District: Qasabeh-ye Gharbi

Population (2016)
  - Total: 837
- Time zone: UTC+3:30 (IRST)

Borzu (Persian: برزو) (Note: Also romanized as Barzū, Berzu, and Borzū) is a village in Qasabeh-ye Gharbi Rural District of the Central District in Sabzevar County, Razavi Khorasan province, Iran.

== Demographics ==
=== Population ===
At the time of the 2006 National Census, the village's population was 852 in 230 households. The following census in 2011 counted 861 people in 263 households. The 2016 census measured the population of the village as 837 people in 264 households.
