= Wind power in Armenia =

Wind power generates less than 1% of Armenia's electricity annually, as there were only four wind farms in 2023 and less than 10 MW is installed.

According to a study sponsored by the United States Department of Energy (DOE) and the United States Agency for International Development (USAID) in 2002–2003, the theoretical wind power potential of Armenia is 4,900 MWe in four zones with a total area of 979 km^{2}. According to this research, the wind energy potential in Armenia is close to 450 MW. The most promising areas for wind power plants are Zod pass, Bazum Mountain, Jajur pass, the territory of Geghama Mountains, Sevan Pass, Aparan, the highlands between Sisian and Goris, and the region of Meghri.

A reassessment by the Asian Development Bank was expected to be completed by 2025.

== Wind farms ==
Lori 1 Wind Farm is a wind farm in Armenia located along the Bazum Mountains at Pushkin Pass in Lori, Armenia. The first wind farm in the country, it has four 660-kW wind turbines and has a capacity of 2.64 MWe. Completed in December 2005 by the Iranian company Sunir with US$3.2 million funding from Iran, it is owned by the High-Voltage Electric Networks of Armenia. In 2006, Lori 1 generated only 2.6 GWh of electricity (a yearly average of 296.8 KWe—about 11% of installed capacity).

The Armenian and Iranian authorities have agreed to expand the wind farm up to 90 MW.

== Future plans and investments ==
Monitoring in Qarahach pass was conducted by the Armenian-Italian private company Ar Energy. The company has a license to construct the Qarahach 1 wind farm with an overall capacity of 20 MW, which could be expanded to 140 MW in the future.

== See also ==
- Energy in Armenia
