= Karrab, Razavi Khorasan =

Village in Razavi Khorasan province, Iran

Karrab Persian: كراب
- Village
- Location within Iran
- Coordinates: 36°21′31″N 57°29′58″E
- Country: Iran
- Province: Razavi Khorasan
- County: Sabzevar
- District: Central
- Rural District: Karrab

Population (2016)
  - Total: 236
- Time zone: UTC+3:30 (IRST)

Karrab (Persian: كراب) (Note: Also romanized as Karāb and Karrāb; also known as Garrāb) is a village in Karrab Rural District of the Central District in Sabzevar County, Razavi Khorasan province, Iran.

== Demographics ==
=== Population ===
At the time of the 2006 National Census, the village's population was 488 in 189 households. The following census in 2011 counted 371 people in 165 households. The 2016 census measured the population of the village as 236 people in 121 households.
