= Qasabeh-ye Gharbi Rural District =

Rural district in Razavi Khorasan province, Iran

Qasabeh-ye Gharbi Rural District Persian: دهستان قصبه غربي
- Rural District
- Location within Iran
- Coordinates: 36°09′N 57°33′E
- Country: Iran
- Province: Razavi Khorasan
- County: Sabzevar
- District: Central
- Established: 1987
- Capital: Khosrowjerd

Population (2016)
  - Total: 9,398
- Time zone: UTC+3:30 (IRST)

Qasabeh-ye Gharbi Rural District (Persian: دهستان قصبه غربي) is in the Central District of Sabzevar County, Razavi Khorasan province, Iran. Its capital is the village of Khosrowjerd.

== Demographics ==
=== Population ===
At the time of the 2006 National Census, the rural district's population was 8,701 in 2,589 households. There were 9,585 inhabitants in 2,993 households at the following census of 2011. The 2016 census measured the population of the rural district as 9,398 in 3,027 households. The most populous of its 61 villages was Abaresh, with 1,497 people.

=== Other villages in the rural district ===
- Borzu
- Estir
- Fasanqar
- Haresabad
- Hoseynabad-e Ganji
- Kaskan
- Kohneh Ab
