= Sadid, South Khorasan =

Sadid سديد
- Village
- Location within Iran
- Coordinates: 32°31′34″N 59°30′21″E
- Country: Iran
- Province: South Khorasan
- County: Sarbisheh
- Bakhsh: Mud
- Rural District: Naharjan

Population (2006)
  - Total: 47
- Time zone: UTC+3:30 (IRST)
  - Summer (DST): UTC+4:30 (IRDT)

Sadid (Persian: سديد, also Romanized as Sadīd) is a village in Naharjan Rural District, Mud District, Sarbisheh County, South Khorasan Province, Iran. At the 2006 census, its population was 47, in 11 families.
