= Karrab Rural District =

Rural district in Razavi Khorasan province, Iran

Karrab Rural District Persian: دهستان كراب
- Rural District
- Location within Iran
- Coordinates: 36°23′N 57°29′E
- Country: Iran
- Province: Razavi Khorasan
- County: Sabzevar
- District: Central
- Established: 1987
- Capital: Belashabad

Population (2016)
  - Total: 1,980
- Time zone: UTC+3:30 (IRST)

Karrab Rural District (Persian: دهستان كراب) is in the Central District of Sabzevar County, Razavi Khorasan province, Iran. Its capital is the village of Belashabad.

== Demographics ==
=== Population ===
At the time of the 2006 National Census, the rural district's population was 3,335 in 1,106 households. There were 2,511 inhabitants in 980 households at the following census of 2011. The 2016 census measured the population of the rural district as 1,980 in 880 households. The most populous of its 13 villages was Afchang, with 842 people.

=== Other villages in the rural district ===
- Beynaq
- Borzu
- Delbar
- Karrab
- Now Deh-e Sorsoreh
- Qaz
- Shareh
