= Deh-e Borzu =

Deh-e Borzu or Deh Borzu (Persian: ده برزو) may refer to:

- Deh-e Borzu, Lorestan
- Deh-e Borzu, Razavi Khorasan
