= Sadid Industrial Group =

- Company type: Holding Company
- Industry: Conglomerate, Oil and Gas
- Founded: 1963; 63 years ago
- Headquarters: Iran
- Area served: Worldwide
- Products: designing, engineering, machines/equipment, spiral and longitudinal welded steel pipes, water and sewage utilities, wind power generators
- Website: www.sadid.ir

Sadid Industrial Group was established in 1963 in Iran. It is an industrial conglomerate in the fields of designing, engineering and fabrication of machines/equipment, production of spiral and longitudinal welded steel pipes, general contracting of oil, gas and petrochemical projects, water and sewage utilities and manufacturing of wind power generators.

== See also ==
- Energy in Iran
- National Iranian Oil Company
