= Sar Pushideh, Bagh-e Malek =

Sar Pushideh سرپوشيده
- Village
- Location within Iran
- Coordinates: 31°27′57″N 49°57′08″E
- Country: Iran
- Province: Khuzestan
- County: Bagh-e Malek
- Bakhsh: Central
- Rural District: Haparu

Population (2006)
  - Total: 223
- Time zone: UTC+3:30 (IRST)
  - Summer (DST): UTC+4:30 (IRDT)

Sar Pushideh (Persian: سرپوشيده, also Romanized as Sar Pūshīdeh) is a village in Haparu Rural District, in the Central District of Bagh-e Malek County, Khuzestan Province, Iran. At the 2006 census, its population was 223, in 38 families.
