= Energy in Iran =

In 2010, Iran held 10% of the world's proven oil reserves and 15% of its gas. It is OPEC's second largest exporter and the world's fourth largest oil producer.

Total primary energy consumption in Iran, by fuel, 2015.

Energy in Iran is characterized by vast reserves of fossil fuels, positioning the country as a global energy powerhouse. Iran holds the world's third-largest proved oil reserves and the second-largest natural gas reserves as of 2021, accounting for 24% of the Middle East's oil reserves and 12% of the global total.

In 2023, the Total Energy Supply (TES) in Iran was predominantly derived from natural gas (71.5%) and oil (26.5%), with nuclear power and renewable sources contributing only 0.5% and 1% each respectively. Despite the heavy reliance on fossil fuels, Iran possesses significant potential for renewable energy. Due to its geographical location near the equator, 90% of the country's land is suitable for solar power generation for at least 300 days a year.

While Iran's energy wealth provides considerable economic opportunities, it also poses challenges. Heavy dependence on oil and gas has resulted in widespread air pollution and high greenhouse gas emissions.

In recent years, Iran has faced a significant energy crisis driven by a combination of aging infrastructure, mismanagement, and international sanctions. This has resulted in frequent power outages, disruptions in industrial production, and challenges in meeting domestic energy demands. Additionally, the growth of cryptocurrency mining in the country has further strained the electricity grid, exacerbating the crisis. Addressing these challenges is crucial for Iran's energy sector to meet the needs of its growing population and economic ambitions. The crisis in Iran energy sector may indicate also a problem in its reported economic data.

== History ==
Iran is in a constant battle to use its energy resources more effectively in the face of subsidization and the need for technological advances in energy exploration and production. In 2008, energy wastage in Iran amounted to six or seven billion dollars. The energy consumption in Iran is extraordinarily higher than international standards. Iran paid $84 billion in subsidies for oil, gas and electricity in 2008.

Iran is one of the most energy-intensive economies of the world, with per capita energy consumption 15 times that of Japan and 10 times that of European Union. Also due to huge energy subsidies, Iran is one of the most energy inefficient countries of the world, with the energy intensity three times higher than global average and 2.5 times the middle eastern average. In 2014, half of Iran's energy was wasted in the domestic sector, 3.4 of which is wasted through single-occupancy vehicle use. 2/3 parts of Iranian power plant energy is wasted.

Iran is one of the leading members of OPEC (Organization of Petroleum Exporting Countries) and the Organization of Gas Exporting Countries (GECF). In 2008, Iran received $47 billion in oil export revenues, which accounts for about 50% of state revenues. Natural gas and oil consumption both account for about half of Iran's domestic energy consumption. With its heavy dependence on oil and gas revenues Iran continues to explore for new sources of natural gas and oil. Since 2009, Iran has focused its energy sector on the exploration of the South Pars offshore natural gas fields in the Persian Gulf.

Iran has become self-sufficient in designing, building and operating dams and power plants and it has won international bids, such as in Ecuador, in competition with foreign firms.

In 2007, energy generation capacity of Iranian thermal power plants reached 173 terawatt hours, accounting for 17.9 percent of energy production in the Middle East and African region. In 2007, Natural gas was the main energy source in Iran, comprising over 55 percent of energy needs, with oil and hydroelectricity accounting for 42 and 2 percent respectively. The region's energy need will increase by 26.8 percent until 2012. In 2017, the fuel consumption in Iran was equivalent to 5.5 million barrels of fuel per day (bpd), the rate of which is considered as the highest energy consumption rate in the world in terms of energy intensity.

Energy plays an important role in Iranian politics. Robert Baer in his 2008 book The Devil We Know: Dealing with the New Iranian Superpower argued that Iran had attained the status of an energy superpower and was on its way to become a military-political superpower.

Iran plans to create an energy saving company in conjunction with the 2014 Iranian subsidy reform plan.

Energy in Iran
Year	Population (million)	Prim. energy (TWh)	Production (TWh)	Export (TWh)	Electricity (TWh)	CO_{2}-emission (Mt)
2004	67.0	1,696	3,233	1,530	137	369
2007	71.0	2,151	3,757	1,602	165	466
2008	72.0	2,350	3,801	1,429	174	505
2009	72.9	2,514	4,068	1,537	168	533
2010	73.97	2,423	4,060	1,574	196	509
2012	74.80	2,467	4,113	1,614	200	521
2012R	76.42	2,554	3,523	961	210	532
2013	77.45	2,656	3,477	649	224	526
Change 2004-10	10.4%	42.9%	25.6%	2.9%	43.0%	37.8%
Mtoe = 11.63 TWh, Prim. energy includes energy losses 2012R = CO2 calculation criteria changed, numbers updated

== Primary energy sources ==
Primary energy supply is around two thirds gas and one third oil, with tiny amounts from other sources.

=== Natural gas ===
Iran's gas production 2016, domestic consumption and exports

Iran is the world's third producer of natural gas (5.1% of the world's total and 184 BCM); which is primarily used for domestic electricity generation or heat production. It contains an estimated 1,187.3 trillion cubic feet (33,620 km^{3}) (Tcf) in proven natural gas reserves. In 2005 a large share of Iran's natural gas reserves were believed to remain untapped. About 62% of these reserves are located in non-associated fields. Iranian production of natural gas is expected to increase over the next few years due to continuing discoveries in the North Pars and South Pars regions.

Domestic consumption has matched production at 3.6×10^{12} cu ft (100 km^{3}) in the year of 2005. Domestic consumption is expected to go up at about 7% per year for the following decade. The Iranian government has also subsidized natural gas prices along with gasoline prices, and this is expected to sustain this high level of domestic consumption. In lieu of this increasing domestic demand, natural gas exports are expected to decrease in the following years.

In 2021, Iran ranked as the world's fourth-largest consumer of natural gas, behind the United States, Russia, and China. A significant share of its natural gas production is utilized domestically in various sectors. Over the last ten years, consumption of natural gas in Iran has risen by approximately 50%, influenced by a range of factors. These include heavily subsidized prices, an extensive distribution network, enhanced domestic production, and government initiatives aimed at replacing oil with natural gas in residential, commercial, and electric power sectors.

Natural gas:

- production: 151.8 billion cu m (2011 est.)
- consumption: 144.6 billion cu m (2010 est.)
- exports: 9.05 billion cu m (2011 est.)
- imports: 10.59 billion cu m (2011 est.)
- proved reserves: 33.61 trillion cu m (1 January 2013 est.)

=== Oil ===
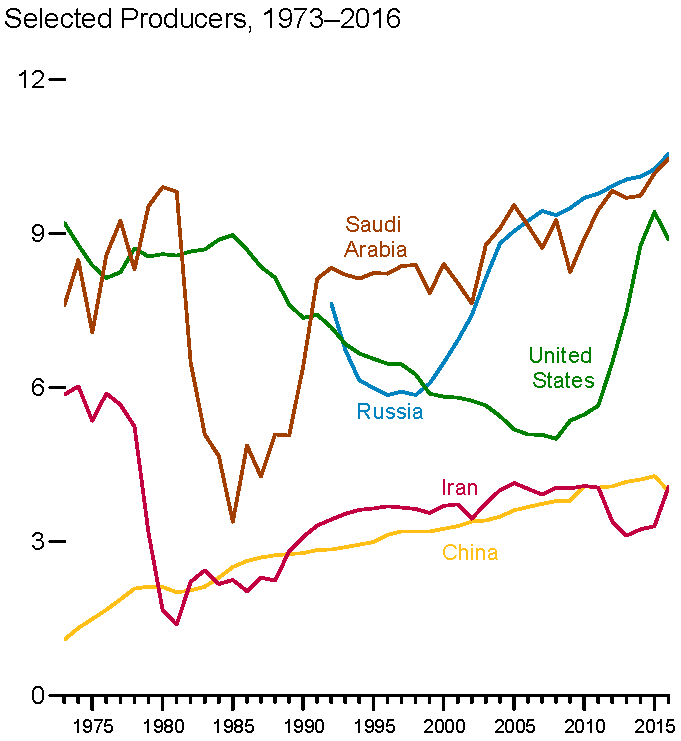
Top oil-producing countries, 1973 to 2016, million barrels per day

Iran has the second largest oil reserves in the world, and the third largest exporter of it. By the end of 2009, Iranian oil R/P ratio was 89.4 years which is the world's highest. By 2009, Iran had 52 active rigs and 1,853 producing oil wells.

Iran possesses abundant fuels from which to generate energy. Since 1913 Iran has been a major oil-exporting country. Oil industry output averaged 4 million barrels (640,000 m^{3}) per day in 2005, compared with the peak output of 6 million barrels per day (950,000 m^{3}/d) reached in 1974. Following the 1979 revolution, however, the government reduced daily oil production in accordance with an oil conservation policy. Further production declines occurred as result of damage to oil facilities during the war with Iraq. In the early 2000s, industry infrastructure was increasingly inefficient because of technological lags. Few exploratory wells were drilled in 2005. Iranian oil was nationalized in 1953 and thus is owned and operated by the National Iranian Oil Company (NIOC).

Iran held 10.3% of the world's total proven oil reserves and that figures out to be about 137.6 billion barrels (2.188×10^{10} m^{3}) of oil reserves at the end of 2009. Oil also is found in northern Iran and in the offshore waters of the Persian Gulf. Nevertheless, in 2005 Iran spent US$4 billion on gasoline imports, mainly because of contraband and inefficient domestic use that result from subsidies. Iran is one of the largest gasoline consumers in the world ranking second behind United States in consumption per car.

There is a growing recognition that prices must rise faster to curb consumption and ease the burden on the public finances. Cheap energy has encouraged wasteful consumption in Iran, and a brisk business in smuggling petrol into Iraq, Turkey, Pakistan and Afghanistan. Demand has also been supported by rapid increases in car production in recent years. In the absence of imports, the car industry has developed strongly (albeit from a low base) with output reaching over 1m vehicles in fiscal year 2006/07 (March 21 – March 20).

Iran oil production, domestic consumption and exports

The growth in consumption of domestically produced oil has been modest, owing to refining constraints. By contrast, fuel imports rose to 180,000 barrels per day (29,000 m^{3}/d) in January 2005 from 30,000 barrels per day (4,800 m^{3}/d) in 2000, and petrol consumption is estimated to have been around 1,800,000 barrels per day (290,000 m^{3}/d) in 2007 (before rationing), of which about one-third is imported. These imports are proving expensive, costing the government about US$4bn in the first nine months of 2007/08, according to parliamentary sources. Nearly 40% of refined oil consumed by Iran is imported from India.

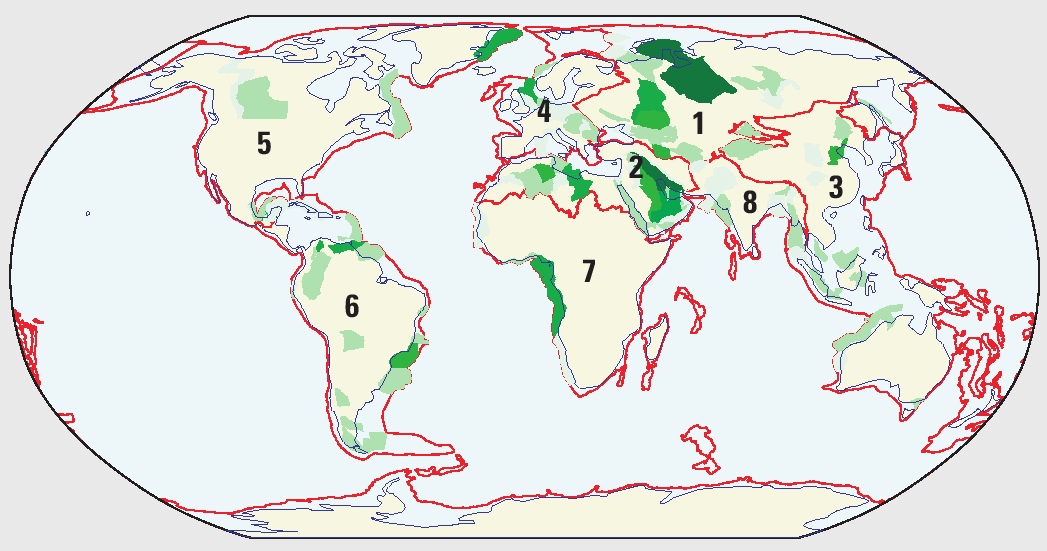
A 2003 USGS map of countries where oil is located

Iran contains 27 onshore and 13 offshore oil-producing fields, largely concentrated in the southwestern Khuzestan region near the Iraqi border. The Iranian government is heavily reliant on oil revenues and they have heavily subsidized the energy industries, which figures out to be about 12% of Iran's GDP. However, domestic oil consumption has decreased due to the alternative use of natural gas. Economic growth from these resources is uncertain and stunted in Iran due to these subsidies and population growth. Iran has been unable to reach it full production levels due to a combination of sanctions and war plaguing the region. Iran's oil fields have a natural decline rate at 8 percent for onshore wells and 10% for offshore fields. The Iranian recovery rate is currently approximately 27 percent, which is well below the world average. Iran needs structural improvements made to coincide with their enhanced oil recovery efforts.

Oil:

- production: 3,589,000 bbl/d (570,600 m^{3}/d) (2012 est.)
- consumption: 1,755,000 bbl/d (279,000 m^{3}/d) (2008 est.) (expected to increase 10% each year since 2006)
- exports: 2,377,000 bbl/d (377,900 m^{3}/d) (2010 est.)
- imports: 156,000 bbl/d (24,800 m^{3}/d) (2010 est.)
- proved reserves: 154.6 Gbbl (24.58×10^{9} m^{3}) based on Iranian claims (1 January 2009 est.)

note: as of 2009, 1/3 of Iran's gasoline needs are imported because of insufficient domestic refining capacity, over-consumption and contraband.

=== Nuclear energy ===
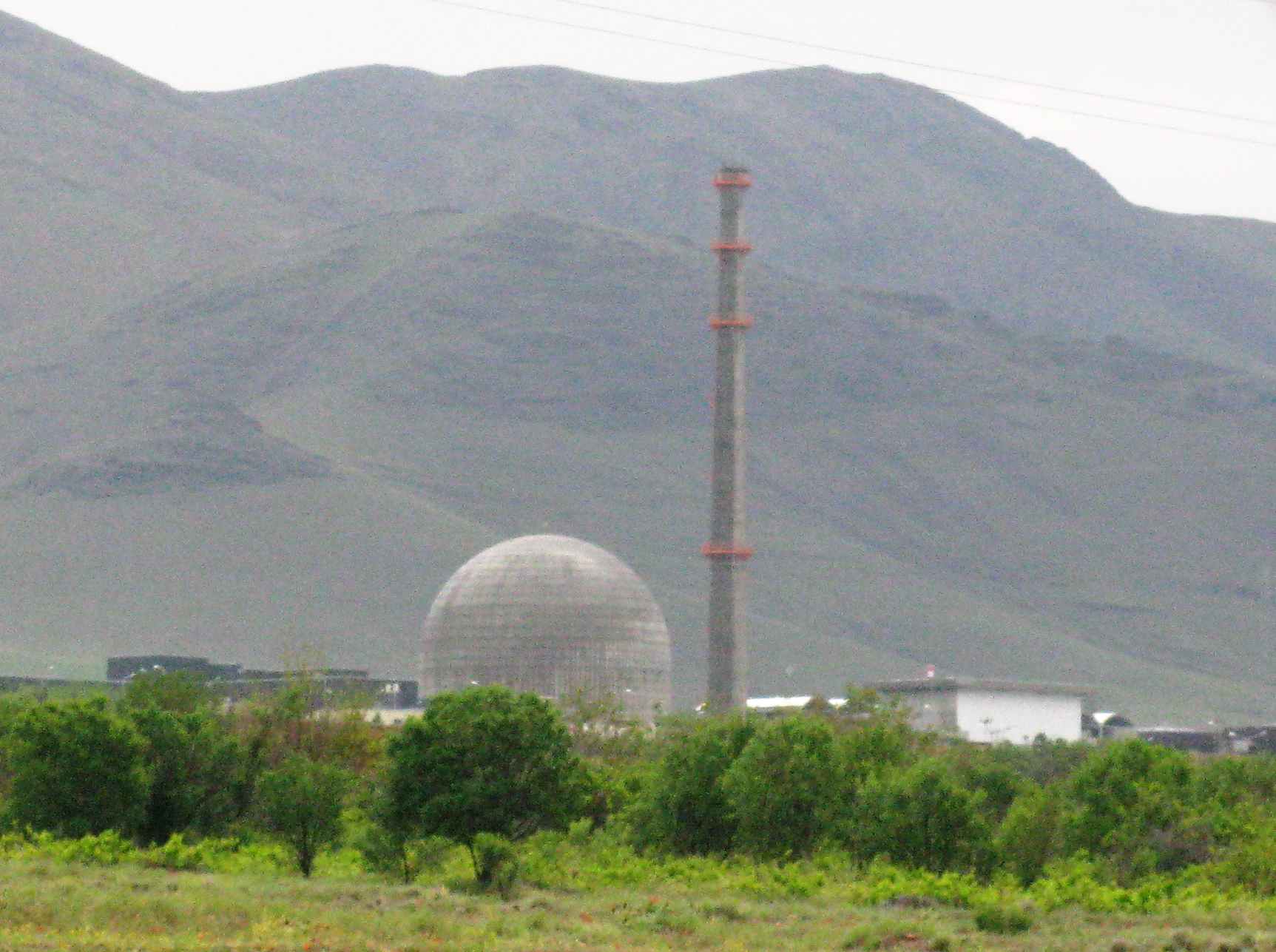
The IR-40 facility in Arak

Iran plans to generate 23,000 MW of electricity through nuclear technology to meet its increasing demand for energy. The first of four 915 MW reactors of Bushehr Nuclear Power Plant, built with help from Russia, came online in August 2010. While nuclear power in the US costs a little over 10 cents per kilowatt hour, Iran, with domestic uranium enrichment capabilities, high interest rates, low energy output (a single 1,000 MW reactor), low efficiency, extremely slow reactor construction, and no reprocessing pays around 68 cents per kilowatt hour (this assumes a price of $140 per separative working unit and of $40 per kilogram of uranium).

=== Hydro ===
Droughts have reduced hydropower. The Energy Ministry plans to improve existing plants and build more small and medium hydro.

=== Biofuel ===
In 2016, the Iranian Biofuel Society (IBS) in collaboration with the Vice Presidency for Science of Technology and Tehran and the Suburbs Bus Company executed the first urban pilot project for the consumption of waste cooking oil biodiesel in Tehran`s bus fleet in an attempt to generate public awareness regarding Global Climate Change, wherein they recommend "reducing net anthropogenic CO2 emissions to the atmosphere" and "minimizing anthropogenic disturbances of" atmospheric gasses by partial replacement of fossil fuels with waste-oriented biofuels. The program was also supported by Small Grant Programme, Global Environmental Facility, United Nation Development Program (SGP/GEF/UNDP) Office in Iran. Research into regional biofuel potential in Iran has identified arid regions like Kerman province as suitable for drought-resistant energy crops such as Jatropha and Sweet Sorghum.

=== Solar ===
In 2021 there were 450 MW of solar power, less than 1% of installed capacity. This is tiny compared to electricity demand and neighbouring countries. In February 2026, there were 4200 MW of solar power, around 4% of installed capacity.

Iran has an average of 2,200 kilowatt-hour solar radiation per square meter annually, and 90% of the country has enough sun to generate solar power 300 days a year.

=== Wind ===
In 2020 there were just over 300 MW of wind power, less than 1% of installed capacity. The east is suitable to build more, and wind there matches annual demand variation, being higher in spring and summer.

=== Geothermal ===
Iran is the 9th largest geothermal energy producer in the world.

According to global tectonics Iran is impacted by subduction of the Arabian Plate under the Central Iranian Plate and four thrust faults: two that make the Southern Caspian Sea Mazandaran Depression and two in the north of Iran, part of the Caucasian Range. Mt. Sabalan and Mt. Sahand are two Quaternary Volcanos in the area. Sabalan is a large stratovolcano consisting of 3 summits named Soltan (4811), Heram (4612m) and Kasra (4573m). The stratovolcano is situated on a possible horst trending northeast-southwest and erupted at latest in the Holocene. Caldera collapsing has caused a depression about 400 m in height and 12 km in diameter. The lava flows consists of trachyandesite, andesite and dacite and pyroclastic deposits. There are 9 hot springs with a temperature in the range of 25-85 °C.

== Electricity ==
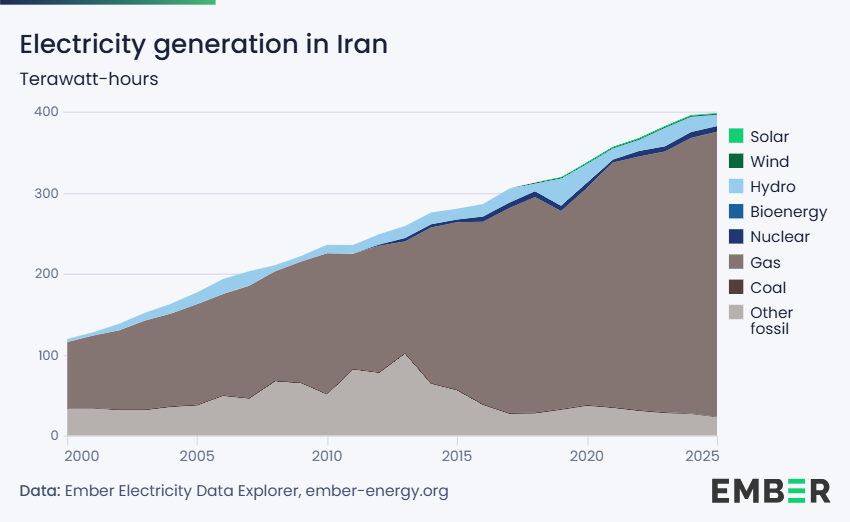
Electricity generation in Iran in terawatt-hours

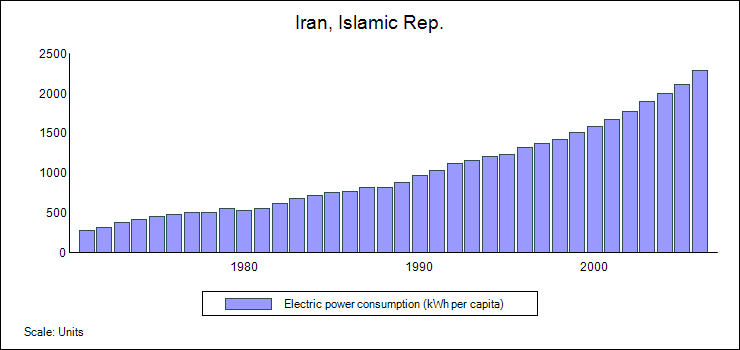
Energy consumption in Iran is 6.5 times that of global average. About 18.5% of electricity is wasted before it reaches consumers due to technical problems. Electric power wastage hit $1.1 billion in 2006.

Electricity generation by fuel in Iran - 2021
1. natural gas (81.0%)
2. oil (14.0%)
3. hydropower (4.00%)
4. non-hydro renewables (e.g. wind, geothermal or solar) (0.00%)
5. coal (0.00%)
6. nuclear (0.00%)

Iran's domestic consumption and production have steadily grown together since 1984 and it is still heavily reliant on traditional thermal energy sources of electricity, with a small fraction being produced by hydroelectric plants. As of 2023 a quarter of electricity is generated from oil and most of the rest is gas-fired. In recent years, Iran has put greater emphasis on participation of domestic and foreign investors in electricity generation sector, with projects underway to add 40,000 MWh more capacity to the national grid.

It is estimated that some 18.5 percent of electricity generated in Iran are wasted before it reaches consumers due to technical problems. Iran is among the top ten manufacturers of gas turbines with a capacity of 160 megawatts. Iran has acquired self-sufficiency of over 80 percent in constructing hydraulic turbines and over 90 percent in producing gas turbines. Within the next few years, Iran can join the list of countries that produce power plant technology (2009). Iran has achieved the technical expertise to set up hydroelectric, gas and combined cycle power plants. Iran is not only self-sufficient in power plant construction but has also concluded a number of contracts on implementing projects in neighboring states.

The exploration efforts for sources of power generation are wide and diverse in Iran. Plans are being made to make oil efficient power plants as well as an emphasis on natural gas production in order to meet their growing electricity demand. Nuclear power and hydroelectric power are not focused on for the time being, but they are part of an overall strategy to meet electricity demands. The electricity sector is also heavily subsidized and mostly state owned companies control power distribution, transmission and generation. In order to meet the demands of the electricity sector, however, Iran is beginning to look into private investment. A by-law has been passed allowing the energy ministry to conclude rial or combined rial/foreign-currency contracts for the purchase of electricity from private companies.

Iran has displayed a new approach to this sector. After the 1979 Islamic Revolution, the construction of hydroelectric power plants became both a popular private and public venture. Often, construction projects did not meet basic environmental standards, engineering standards, and technical requirements. As a result, many of these dams were destroyed or left in dilapidated conditions.

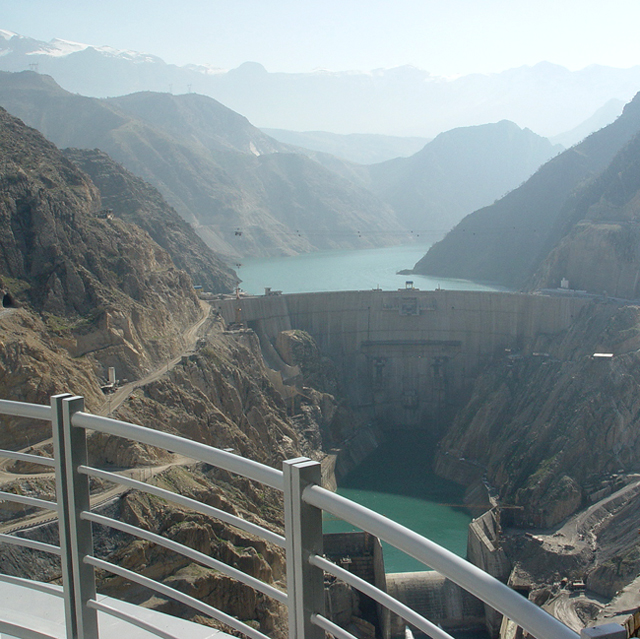
The Karun-3 dam & hydroelectric power plant was commissioned in 2005. Iran has emerged as one of the world's largest dam builders in recent years.

By 2004, the addition of new hydroelectric stations and the streamlining of conventional coal- and oil-fired stations increased installed capacity to 33,000 megawatts (MW). Of that amount, about 75 percent was based on natural gas, 18 percent on oil, and 7 percent on hydroelectric power. However, in 2004 Iran opened its first wind-powered and geothermal plants, and the first solar thermal plant was to come online in 2009.

In 2021, Iran produced 341 terawatt-hours (TWh) of net electricity, 94% of which came from fossil fuels. Natural gas was the primary source, accounting for about 81% of electricity generation. Oil's contribution rose from 9% in 2018 to 14% in 2021, driven by international sanctions that limited oil exports and impacted associated natural gas production, leading to increased domestic use and substitution with diesel and fuel oil in power generation. Additionally, condensate storage capacity constraints hindered non-associated natural gas production, prompting greater reliance on alternative fuels. In response, Iran is upgrading its older natural gas plants to more efficient combined-cycle plants and expanding capacity to reduce hydropower dependency, improve generation efficiency, and increase oil availability for export.

It has been estimated that Iran has the potential to produce at least 6,150 MWh of electricity by wave power from its coastline on Persian Gulf alone. Iran is also experimenting with electricity generation from organic wastes and plans to build power plants using sewage and organic waste of domestic and industrial origin as fuel. With about 300 clear sunny days a year and an average of 2,200 kilowatt-hour solar radiation per square meter, Iran has significant potential to tap solar energy.

In 2021, Iran's electricity generation was primarily sourced from natural gas, accounting for 81% of total production. Oil contributed 14%, followed by hydropower at 4%, and nuclear power at 1%. Both coal and non-hydro renewable sources each made up less than 1% of the electricity generation mix.

According to a 2022 U.S. Energy Information Administration (EIA) report, Iran has experienced escalating electricity demand driven by factors including illegal cryptocurrency mining, population growth, highly subsidized electricity prices, and fuel supply shortages. This increase in demand has been particularly acute during the peak seasons of summer and winter, putting significant strain on the nation's electrical infrastructure. As a result, Iran encountered notable power shortages in 2020 and 2021. During the summer of 2021, the situation intensified when electricity demand exceeded the available supply by nearly 12 gigawatts (GW).

== Subsidies ==
Iran was estimated to have paid 19% of GDP for energy subsidies in 2019.

Iran is the world largest energy subsidizer, leading to highly wasteful consumption patterns, price distortions in its economy, pollution and very lucrative contraband with neighboring countries because of price differentials.

== Environment ==
Iran is one of the largest CO2 polluters.

Air pollution, much of which is from fossil fuels, is estimated to cause nearly 3000 deaths a year in Tehran alone.

- CO_{2} emissions per capita: 11.9 tonnes (2015 est.)
- GDP per unit of energy use: 4.0 (2007)
- Energy use per capita (kg of oil equivalent) (2005 PPP $ per kg of oil equivalent): 2,352 (2007)

== Renewable energy ==
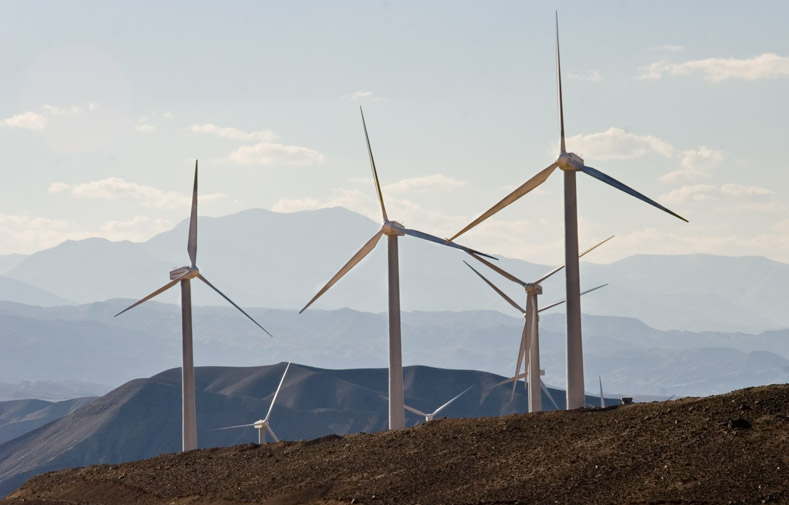
Iran has established wind farms in several areas, this one near Manjeel.

In 2022 less than 1% of electricity was generated by solar and wind.

Iran plans to introduce 10,000 megawatts of renewable electricity into the electricity grid by the end of 2025.

== See also ==
- Economy of Iran
- Ministry of Energy (Iran)
- Wind power in Iran
- Nationalization of the Iranian oil industry
