= Robat-e Sar Push =

Village in Razavi Khorasan province, Iran

Robat-e Sar Push Persian: رباط سرپوش
- Village
- Location within Iran
- Coordinates: 36°10′58″N 57°56′13″E
- Country: Iran
- Province: Razavi Khorasan
- County: Sabzevar
- District: Central
- Rural District: Robat

Population (2016)
  - Total: 1,360
- Time zone: UTC+3:30 (IRST)

Robat-e Sar Push (Persian: رباطسرپوش) (Note: Also romanized as Robāţ-e Sar Pūsh; also known as Robāţ-e Sar Pūshīdeh and Robāţī-ye Shāzdeh) is a village in, and the capital of, Robat Rural District in the Central District of Sabzevar County, Razavi Khorasan province, Iran.

== Demographics ==
=== Population ===
At the time of the 2006 National Census, the village's population was 1,111 in 297 households. The following census in 2011 counted 1,192 people in 321 households. The 2016 census measured the population of the village as 1,360 people in 425 households, the most populous in its rural district.
