= Qasabeh-ye Sharqi Rural District =

Rural district in Razavi Khorasan province, Iran

Qasabeh-ye Sharqi Rural District Persian: دهستان قصبه شرقی
- Rural District
- Location within Iran
- Coordinates: 36°15′N 57°44′E
- Country: Iran
- Province: Razavi Khorasan
- County: Sabzevar
- District: Central
- Established: 1987
- Capital: Izi

Population (2016)
  - Total: 7,813
- Time zone: UTC+3:30 (IRST)

Qasabeh-ye Sharqi Rural District (Persian: دهستان قصبه شرقی) is in the Central District of Sabzevar County, Razavi Khorasan province, Iran. Its capital is the village of Izi.

== Demographics ==
=== Population ===
At the time of the 2006 National Census, the rural district's population was 7,664 in 2,129 households. There were 7,513 inhabitants in 2,375 households at the following census of 2011. The 2016 census measured the population of the rural district as 7,813 in 2,553 households. The most populous of its 25 villages was Izi, with 2,486 people.

=== Other villages in the rural district ===
- Aliabad-e Shur
- Baghan
- Baghjar
- Delqand
- Dowlatabad
- Kheyrabad
- Raz Qand
- Sang-e Sefid
