= Barzu, North Khorasan =

Barzu برزو
- Village
- Location within Iran
- Coordinates: 37°35′55″N 57°57′59″E
- Country: Iran
- Province: North Khorasan
- County: Shirvan
- Bakhsh: Sarhad
- Rural District: Takmaran

Population (2006)
  - Total: 171
- Time zone: UTC+3:30 (IRST)
  - Summer (DST): UTC+4:30 (IRDT)

Barzu (Persian: برزو, also Romanized as Barzū, Bārzū, and Borzū) is a village in Takmaran Rural District, Sarhad District, Shirvan County, North Khorasan Province, Iran. At the 2006 census, its population was 171, in 40 families.
