= Lori 1 Wind Farm =

Wind farm in Armenia

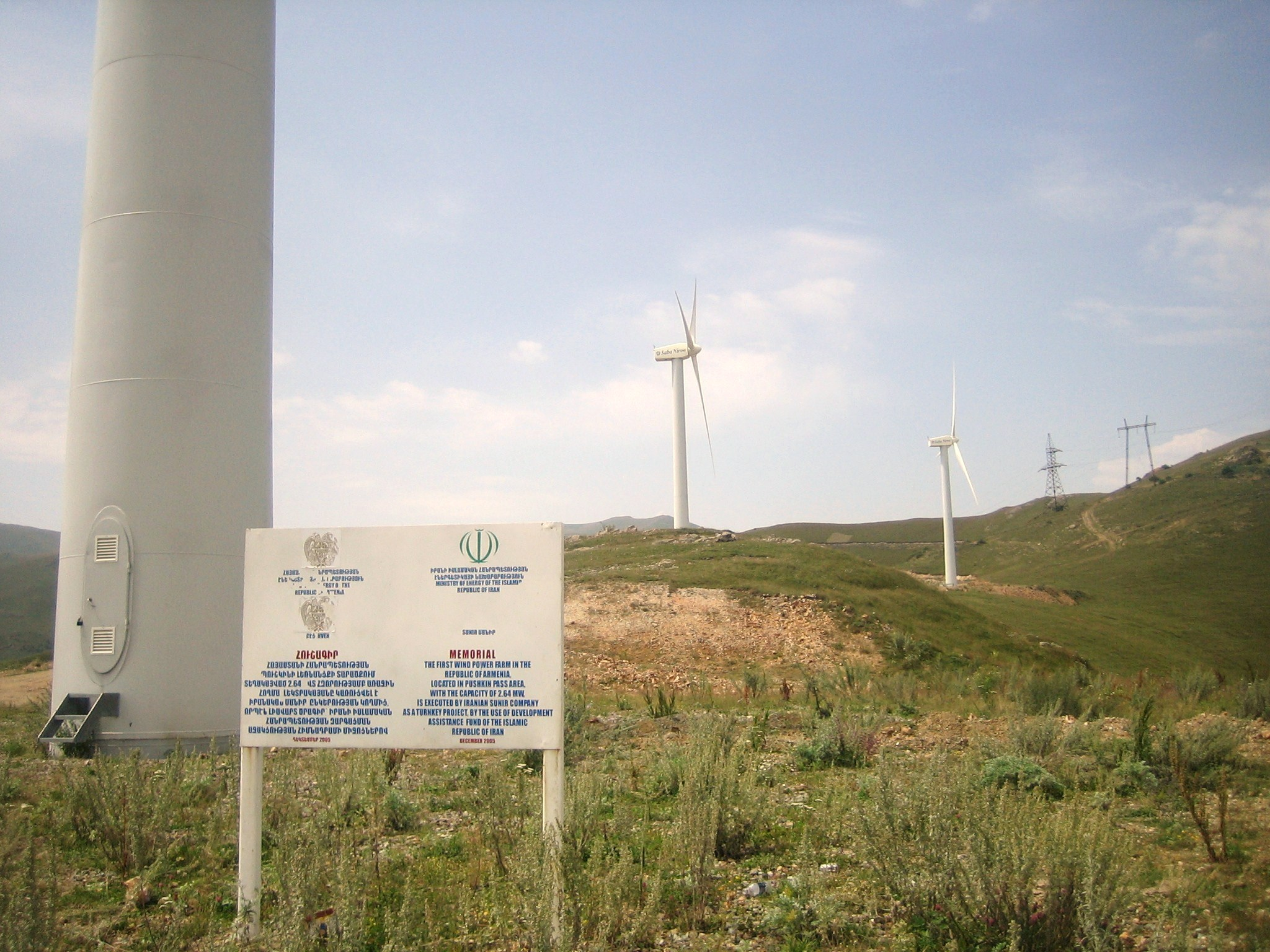
- The Lori 1 Wind Power plant at Pushkin Pass
- Country: Armenia
- Location: Lori Province
- Coordinates: 40°54′41.36″N 44°25′52.86″E
- Status: Operational
- Commission date: 2005
- Construction cost: US$3.2 million
- Owner: High-Voltage Electric Networks of Armenia

Wind farm
- Type: Onshore

Power generation
- Units operational: 4 x 660 kW
- Nameplate capacity: 2.6 MW; Planned: 90 MW

External links
- Commons: Related media on Commons

Lori 1 Wind Farm is a wind farm in Armenia located along the Bazum Mountains at Pushkin Pass in Lori, Armenia. The first wind farm in the country, it has four 660-kW wind turbines and has a capacity of 2.64 MWe. Completed in December 2005 by the Iranian company Sunir with US$3.2 million funding from Iran, it is owned by the High-Voltage Electric Networks of Armenia. In 2006, Lori 1 generated only 2.6 GWh of electricity (a yearly average of 296.8 KWe—about 11% of installed capacity).

The Armenian and Iranian authorities have agreed to expand the wind farm up to 90 MW.
