= Central District (Sabzevar County) =

District in Razavi Khorasan province, Iran

Central District (Sabzevar County) Persian: بخش مرکزی شهرستان سبزوار
- District
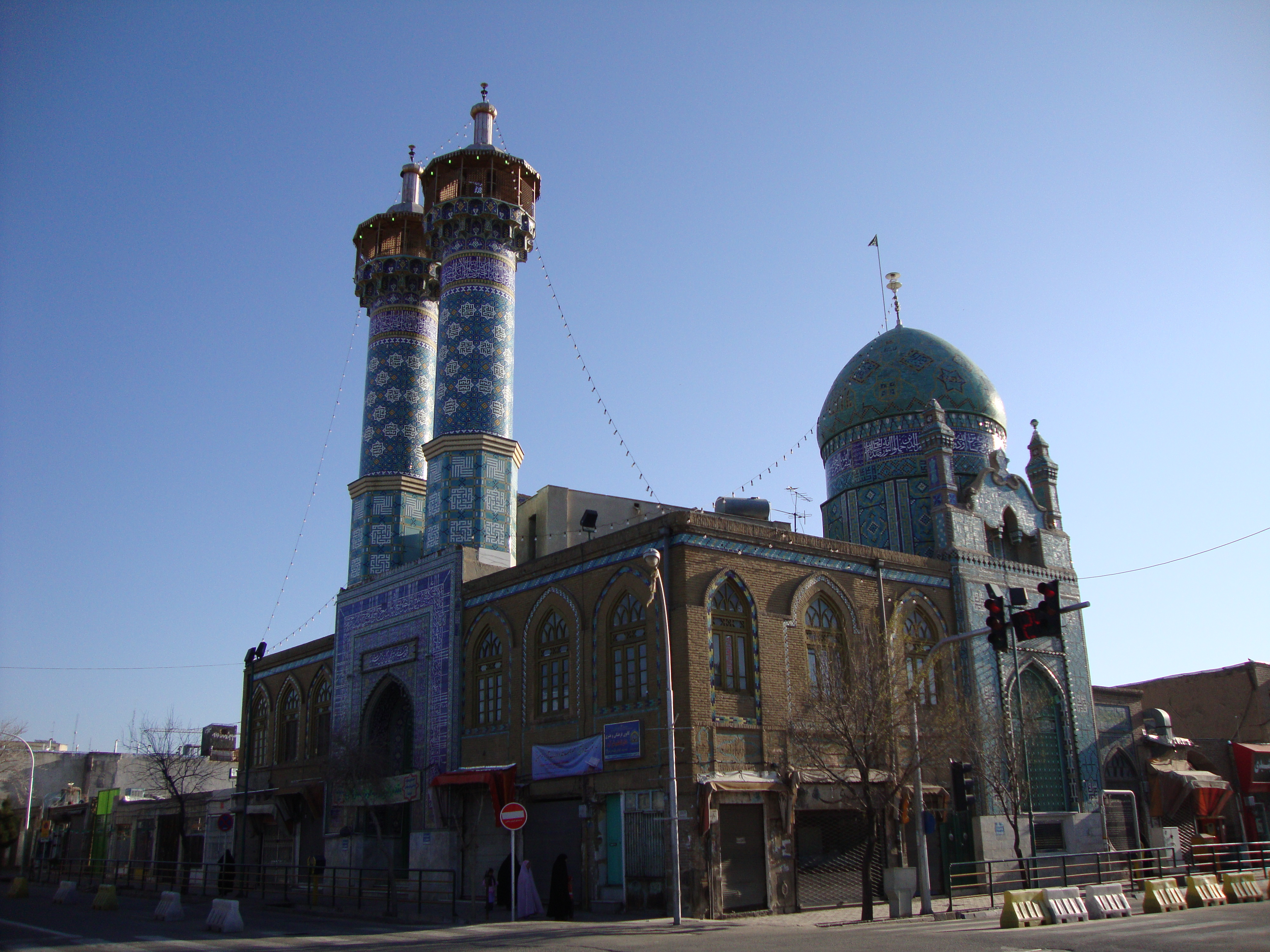
- Yahya Monument, Sabzevar

- Location within Iran
- Coordinates: 36°13′N 57°51′E
- Country: Iran
- Province: Razavi Khorasan
- County: Sabzevar
- Capital: Sabzevar

Population (2016)
  - Total: 268,642
- Time zone: UTC+3:30 (IRST)

The Central District of Sabzevar County (Persian: بخش مرکزی شهرستان سبزوار) is in Razavi Khorasan province, Iran. Its capital is the city of Sabzevar.

== Demographics ==
=== Population ===
At the time of the 2006 National Census, the district's population was 233,744 in 64,532 households. The following census in 2011 counted 256,869 people in 78,524 households. The 2016 census measured the population of the district as 268,642 inhabitants in 83,112 households.

=== Administrative divisions ===
Central District (Sabzevar County) Population
Administrative Divisions	2006	2011	2016
Karrab RD	3,335	2,511	1,980
Qasabeh-ye Gharbi RD	8,701	9,585	9,398
Qasabeh-ye Sharqi RD	7,664	7,513	7,813
Robat RD	5,872	5,703	5,751
Sabzevar (city)	208,172	231,557	243,700
Total	233,744	256,869	268,642
RD = Rural District
