= List of power stations in Iran =

Iran power stations

In 2012, Iran had roughly 400 power plant units. By the end of 2013, it had a total installed electricity generation capacity of 70,000 MW, up from 90 MW in 1948, and 7024 MW in 1978. There are plans to add more than 5,000 MW of generation capacity annually to the power grid, which would almost double the total power generation capacity to 122,000 MW by 2022. The government of Iran planned to privatize 20 power plants by September 2010. Iran's peak demand for electricity was 45,693 MW during the summer of 2013.

It was predicted in 2014 that Iran would account for 17.08% of MENA power generation. Natural gas was the major fuel used to generate electricity in Iran in 2009, accounting for an estimated 56.8% of primary energy demand (PED), followed by oil at 40.8% and hydroelectricity at 1.4%. As of 2010, the average efficiency of power plants in Iran was 38%. The figure should reach 45% within five years and 50% under Vision 2025.

Electricity generation in 2008 accounted for 203.8 TWh, or roughly 1% of world's total production, an increase of 5.9% from the year before. In 2008, the total electricity generated was 190.2 TWh, of which 93.3% was generated by power plants affiliated with the Ministry of Energy and 13.6 TWh (6.7%) by other institutions, which were mostly from the private sector. The largest share of electricity (91.1 TWh) was generated by steam power plants, while diesel power plants accounted for the smallest share of generation (0.2 TWh). In 2008, the highest growth in generation of electricity belonged to gas and combined-cycle power plants, with a 9.3% growth rate while, the amount of electricity generated by hydroelectric power plants declined by 1.7%. As of 2010, the consumer price of electricity in Iran was 1.6 US cents per kilowatt-hour, while the real production cost was about 8.0 US cents. (See also: Cost of electricity by source)

In 2010, 900,000 jobs were directly or indirectly related to the Iranian power industry. Currently, Iran's spares power capacity stands at 3%, but this amount is much lower than the ideal 25% of peak power used. It has been estimated that 23.5% of the electricity generation is wasted in the transmission network. Iran's power grid has been connected to seven neighboring countries, Afghanistan, Pakistan, Iraq, Turkey, Armenia, Azerbaijan, and Turkmenistan, and annually exports 5.5 TWh of electricity.

== Manufacturing ==
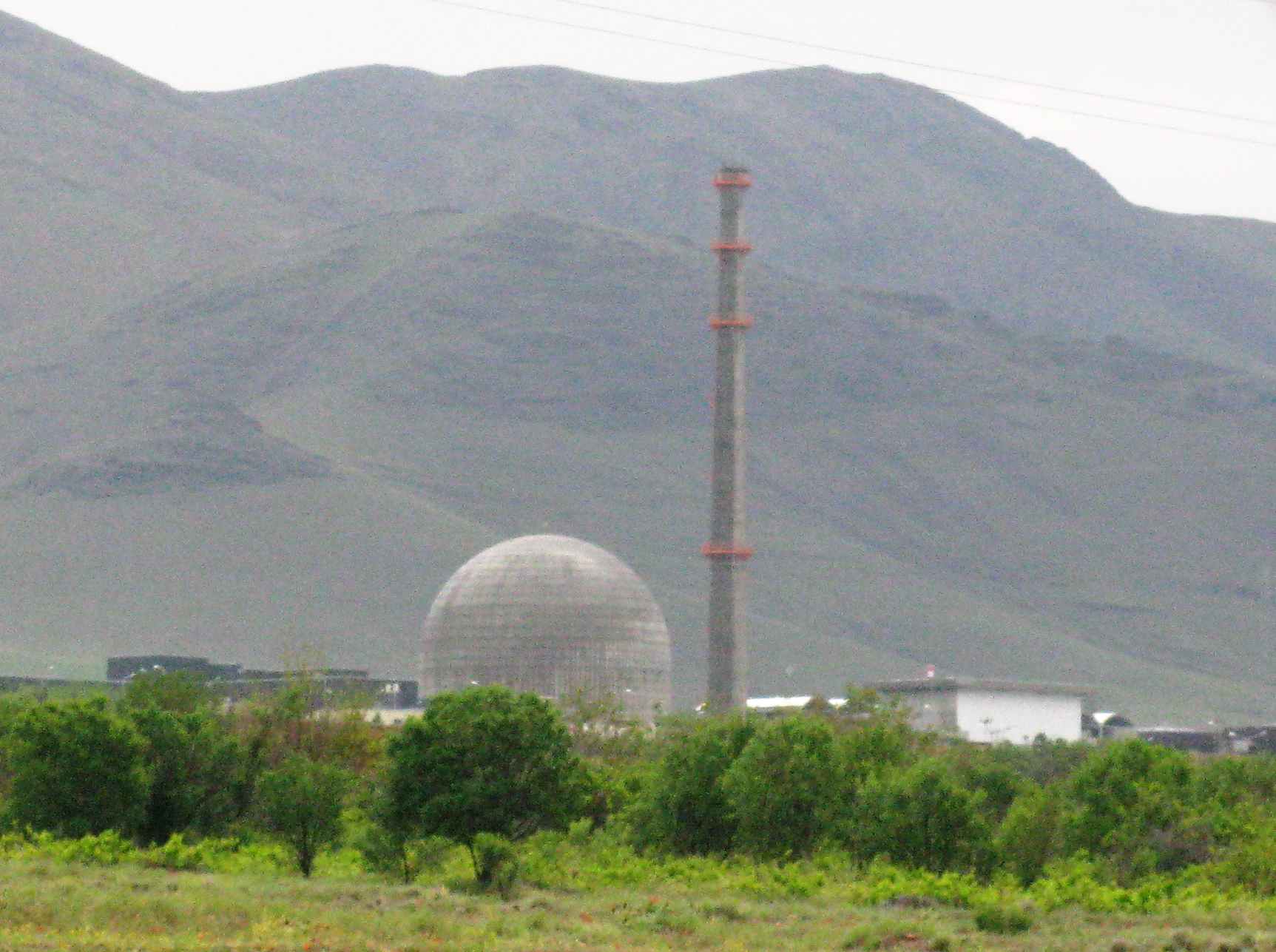
The IR-40 facility in Arak

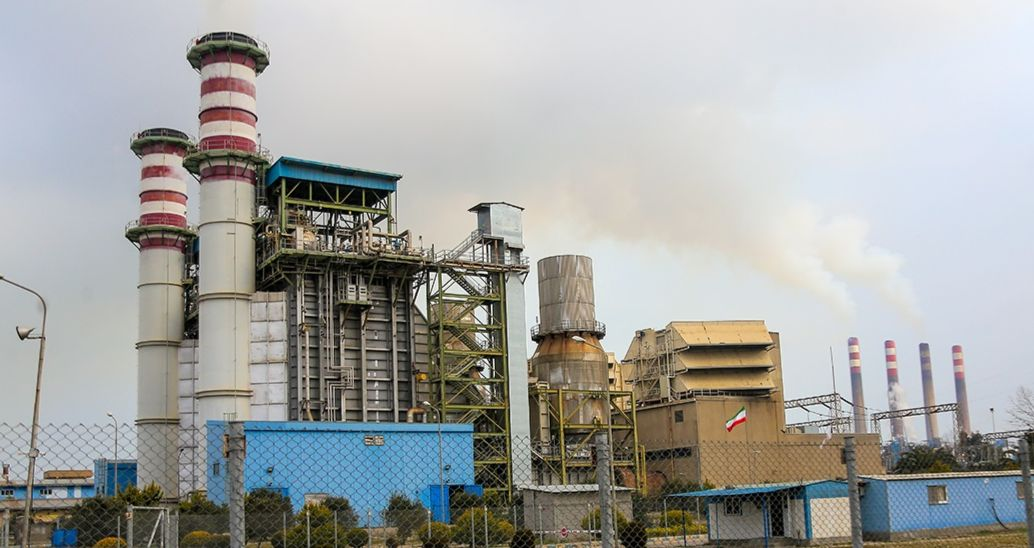
Shahid Salimi Combined Cycle Power Plant in Mazandaran

The electric power industry in Iran has become self-sufficient in producing the required equipment to build power plants. While most of the electricity generators are run by the government, the equipment producers and contractors are generally from the private sector. Iran is among the top ten manufacturers of gas turbines, with a capacity of up to 160 megawatts.

Iranian engineers at JEMCO (a subsidiary of IDRO) have developed and produced one- and four-megawatt generators. Iran can manufacture materials for over 80% of hydraulic turbines and over 90% of gas turbines. In the near future, Iran could become a major player in building power plants with advanced technology (2009). Iran planned to build its first indigenous gas turbines by 2015.

Iran has achieved the technical expertise to set up hydroelectric, gas, and combined-cycle power plants. Iran is one of the four countries in the world which can manufacture advanced V94.2 gas turbines. The Industrial Development and Renovation Organization of Iran (IDRO) is currently building the country's first 4-megawatt (MW) combined heat and power (CHP) turbo-generator in cooperation with the private sector.

=== Nuclear power plants ===
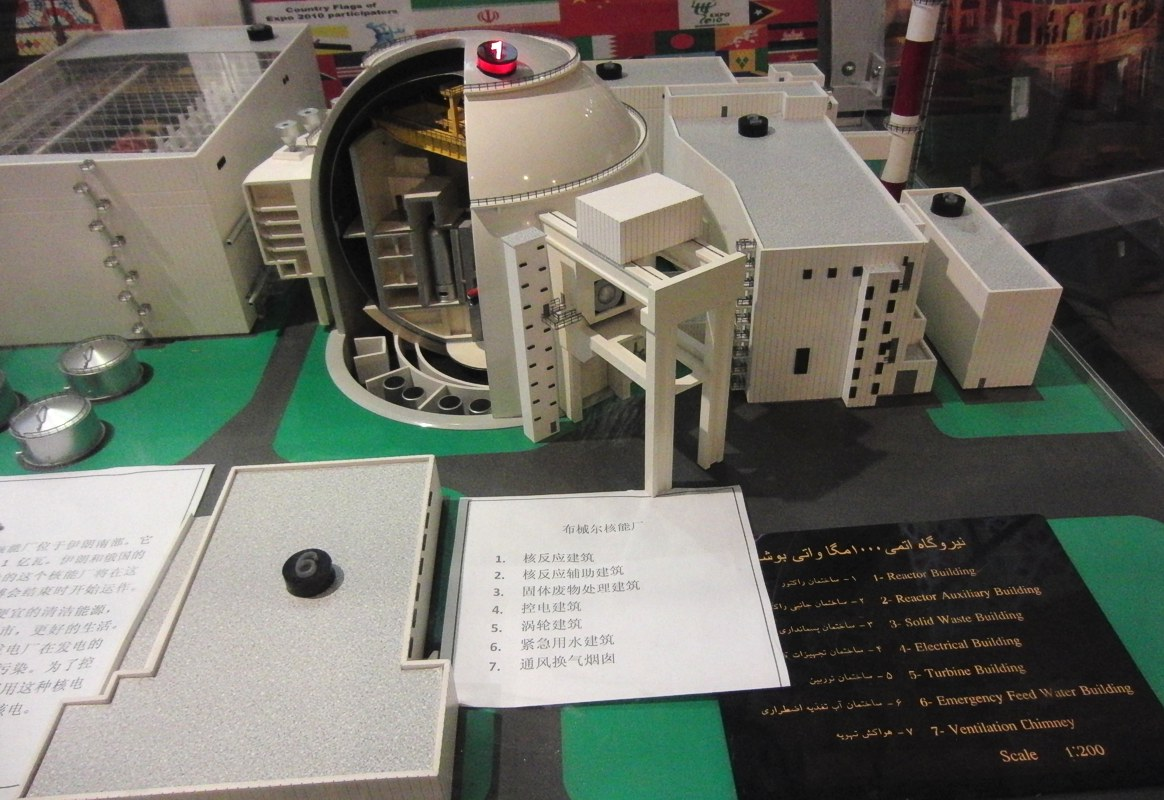
A model of the Bushehr Nuclear Power Plant

Darkhovin Nuclear Power Plant is Iran's first indigenously-designed and -built power plant besides the research reactor IR-40. Bushehr Nuclear Power Plant is Iran's first nuclear power plant; it was manufactured with the technical assistance of Russia.

=== International projects ===
Iran is self-sufficient in power plant construction and has built power plants in neighboring states . As of 2010, Iranian energy- and resource-development firms are involved in 50 projects worth over US$2.2 billion in more than 20 countries across the world. As at 2011, MAPNA was building power plants in Syria, Oman, and Iraq, and negotiations were underway to build two power plants in Lebanon.

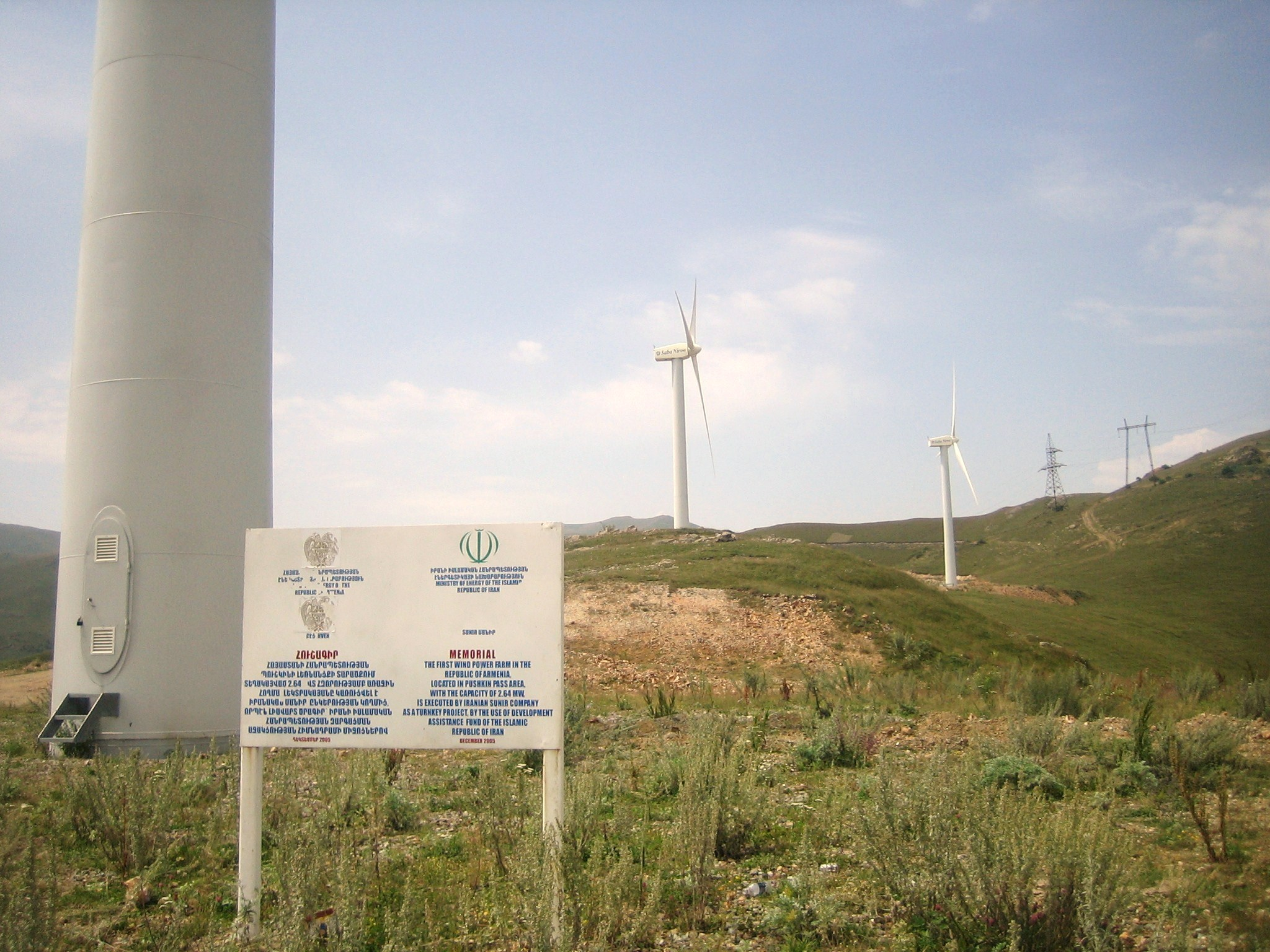
Pushkin Pass, Armenia

One of Iran's most important international projects will see the construction of a $200-million hydroelectric dam in Nicaragua, starting in 2011. Iran is currently engaged in dam construction in Tajikistan, Armenia, and Azerbaijan, and consultations are underway with a number of other countries. Kenya, Sri Lanka, Bolivia, and Mali are the potential target markets being considered for exporting the country's technical and engineering services.

In December 2005, a wind farm was put in operation at Pushkin Pass in Armenia. The total installed capacity of the farm is 2.64 MW, from four 660 kW wind turbines. The wind farm was built with the support of a US$3.1M grant from the Iranian government. The Armenian and Iranian energy sectors are currently jointly constructing the Iran-Armenia Wind Farm, which is set to become the country's largest wind farm, having an installed electric capacity of 90 MW. As at 2012, Iran is building seven large power plants in Syria, Oman, Iraq, and Tajikistan.

=== Foreign direct investment ===
According to the Ministry of Energy, Germany has invested $445 million in construction of the Pareh-Sar combined-cycle power plant in northern Iran, while the UAE has invested $720 million in construction of a gas power plant and a combined-cycle power plant in Isfahan and Shiraz. In 2015, Iran and Russia signed an agreement regarding the construction of eight thermal power plants in Iran, with a total installed capacity of 2,800 MW. The investment per MW will be $3.57 million ($10 billion in total).

== Privatization ==
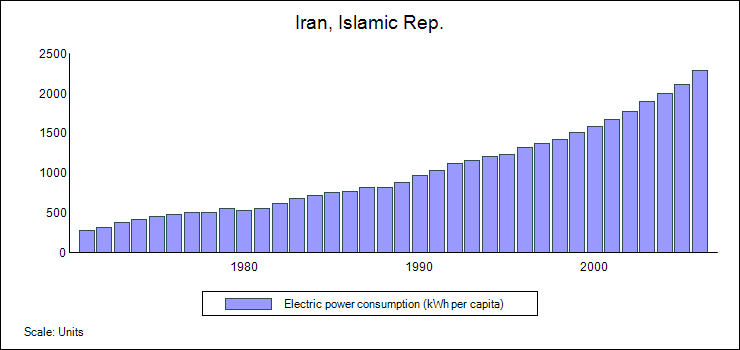
It is estimated that 18.5% of electricity generated in Iran is wasted before it reaches consumers due to technical problems. Electric power wastage hit $1.1 billion in 2006. Solutions include production and use of more efficient light bulbs.

Mapna Company, Sahand, Bistoun, Shazand, Shahid Montazeri, Tous, Shahid Rajaei, and Neishabour power stations are among the profit-making plants. Work on privatizing them was scheduled to be finalized by late March 2007. Jahrom, Khalij-e Fars (Persian Gulf), and Sahand power plants were to be ceded to the private sector in 2009.

All domestic power plants will be privatized gradually, except those the government feels it should run to ensure security of the national electricity grid. Power plants of Damavand, Mashhad, Shirvan, Kerman, Khalij-e Fars, Abadan, Bisotoon, Sanandaj, Manjil and Binalood, which have been turned into public limited firms, are ready for privatization. As of 2010, 20 power plants were ready for privatization in Iran.

Upon ceding the 20 power plants to IPO, some 40% of the capacity of power plants nationwide will be assigned to the private and cooperative sectors. As of 2011, about 45 power plants across the country were to be handed over to the private sector. In 2012, it was announced that Iran's government, which had already turned over 17 of its 45 power plants to the private sector since 2008, would transfer 28 more plants with an estimated value of $11.4 billion (USD), by March 2013.

== Energy/electricity bourse ==
As at 2012, Iran had over 400 power-plant units and 38 electricity-distribution companies, which buy the electricity from producers. Iran has over 100 companies that consume more than 20 MW of electricity. The average price of each kilowatt-hour of electricity is 450 rials (around 5 cents) during the first phase of the Subsidy Reform Law. The average final price of each kilowatt-hour of electricity will be 1000 rials (around 10 cents) in 2015. According to the government of Iran, power stations have to pay the export price of gas if they want to export electricity and must improve efficiency.

Iran's electricity export and related technical and engineering services exports was valued at $4 billion in 2011. In 2010, the total of Iran's electricity exports to Afghanistan, Iraq (650 MW), Azerbaijan, Armenia, Pakistan, and Turkey reached 878 megawatts, and the total of imports from Armenia (237 MW) and Turkmenistan was recorded at 463 megawatts. Jordan, India, Oman, Qatar, Russia, Syria, and the UAE are the new countries that have expressed interest in buying electricity from Iran.

== Waste to energy ==
Name	Location	Capacity (MW)	Type	Operational	Notes
Shiraz Biogas Power Plant	Fars province	1.1	Biogas power station	2009	The plant uses organic waste as fuel for production of electricity from waste.
Mashhad Biogas Power Plant	Razavi Khorasan province	0.6	Biogas power station	2010	The plant uses organic waste as fuel for production of electricity from waste.
?	Tehran province	3.5	Waste incineration	2012	The plant has the capacity to burn 300 tonnes of solid waste per day.
Sari Incineration Power Plant	Mazandaran province	4	Waste incineration	2012	The plant is designed to incinerate over 450 tonnes of waste per day, producing 10 MW of electricity. It is used to develop information for 20 other such plants to be deployed in Iran's major cities.

== Fossil ==
Name	Location	Capacity (MW)	Type	Operational	Notes
Rudeshur Power Plant	Markazi province	2,000	Natural gas power station	2007	Open-cycle gas turbine (OCGT). This is the first private power plant in Iran, belonging to Arian Mah-Taab Gostar Co.
Kazerun Power Plant	Fars province	1,373	Natural gas power station	1994	CHP-type thermal station incorporating Iran's first locally-produced gas turbine, generator set, and steam turbine
Sultanyeh Power Plant	Zanjan province	1,000	Natural gas power station	2011	CHP-type thermal station
Urmia Power Plant	West Azarbaijan Province	60	Natural gas power station	1982	Natural-gas thermal station in the city of Urmia
Urmia Combined Power Plant	West Azarbaijan Province	1,500	Natural gas power station	2011	CHP-type thermal station
Khoy Combined Power Plant	West Azarbaijan Province	453	Natural gas power station	1996	CHP-type thermal station
Iranshahr steam Power Plant	Sistan and Baluchestan province	256	Natural gas power station	1996	Thermal power station running on natural gas as primary fuel and furnace oil as backup fuel
Chabahar Combined Power Plant	Sistan and Baluchestan province	478	Natural gas power station	2011	Combined-cycle plant running on natural gas as primary fuel and furnace oil as backup fuel; part of generation for export to Pakistan
Konarak NG Power Plant	Sistan and Baluchestan province	150	Natural gas power station	2009	Thermal power station
Zahedan NG Power Plant	Sistan and Baluchestan province	230	Natural gas power station		Gas turbine plant providing power for Zahidan
Zahidan Diesel Power Plant	Sistan and Baluchestan province	24	Diesel engine generator	1976	Electrical generation currently used only for peak power management
Zabul Diesel Power Plant	Sistan and Baluchestan province	29	Diesel engine generator		Electrical generation currently used only for peak power management
Khash Diesel Power Plant	Sistan and Baluchestan province	22	Diesel engine generator		Electrical generation currently used only for peak power management
Iranshahr Diesel Power Plant	Sistan and Baluchestan province	30	Diesel engine generator		Electrical generation currently used only for peak power management
Saravan Diesel Power Plant	Sistan and Baluchestan province	13	Diesel engine generator		Electrical generation currently used only for peak power management
Iranshahr combined Power Plant	Sistan and Baluchestan province	1,000	Natural gas power station	2011	Combined-cycle plant running on natural gas as primary fuel and furnace oil as backup fuel
Shaheed Salimi Neka Combined Power Plant	Mazandaran province	2,214	Natural gas power station	2006	Combined-cycle plant running on natural gas as primary fuel and furnace oil as backup fuel
Nishapur Combined Power Plant	Razavi Khorasan province	1,042	Natural gas power station	1993	Combined-cycle plant running on natural gas as primary fuel and diesel as backup fuel
Fars Combined Power Plant	Fars province	1,050	Natural gas power station	2008	Combined-cycle plant running on natural gas as primary fuel and furnace oil as backup fuel
Sarehpar Combined Power Plant	Gilan province	968	Natural gas power station	2010	Combined-cycle plant running on natural gas as primary fuel and furnace oil as backup fuel
Shaheed Kaveh Combined Power Plant	South Khorasan province	630	Natural gas power station	2008	Combined-cycle plant running on natural gas as primary fuel and diesel as backup fuel; being upgraded to 950 MW
Mahshahr NG Power Plant	Khuzestan province	968	Natural gas power station	2012	Combined-cycle plant under construction
Abadan NG Power Plant	Khuzestan province	493	Natural gas power station	2002	Plant convertible to combined cycle
Aliabad Katool Combined Power Plant	Golestan province	1,500	Natural gas power station	2011	Combined-cycle plant running on natural gas as primary fuel and diesel as backup fuel
Zavareh Combined Power Plant	Isfahan province	484	Natural gas power station	2011	Combined-cycle plant running on natural gas as primary fuel and diesel as backup fuel
Aryan Combined Power Plant	Zanjan province	1,000	Natural gas power station	2013	Combined-cycle plant under construction
Zanjan 4 Combined Power Plant	Zanjan province	484	Natural gas power station	2012	Combined-cycle plant under construction
Zanjan 1 Combined Power Plant	Zanjan province	484	Natural gas power station		Combined-cycle plant under construction
Khorramabad Combined Power Plant	Lorestan province	2,000	Natural gas power station		Combined-cycle plant under construction
Behistun Steam Power Plant	Kermanshah province	1,280	Natural gas power station	2013	Thermal power station
Zagrus NG Power Plant	Kermanshah province	648	Natural gas power station	2011	Gas-turbine plant constructed adjacent to Behistun Steam Power Plant; convertible to combined cycle with resultant increased output of 1000 MW
Islamabad Combined Power Plant	Kermanshah province	484	Natural gas power station	2012	Combined-cycle plant
Islamabad NG Power Plant	Kermanshah province	100	Natural gas power station	2011	Gas-turbine plant
Pasargadae Combined Power Plant	Hormozgān Province	500	Natural gas power station	2011	Combined-cycle plant situated on Qeshm island is to be connected with submarine power cable to the national grid
Kahnooj Combined Power Plant	Kerman province	1,000	Natural gas power station	2013	Combined-cycle plant under construction
Kerman Combined Power Plant	Kerman province	2,000	Natural gas power station	2010	Combined-cycle plant
Noshahr NG Power Plant	Mazandaran province	50	Natural gas power station	2009	Gas-turbine plant
West Mazandaran Combined Power Plant	Mazandaran province	484	Natural gas power station		Combined-cycle plant under construction
Amirabad Port NG Power Plant	Mazandaran province	75	Natural gas power station		Gas-turbine plant under construction
Sarakhs Combined Power Plant	Razavi Khorasan province	1,650	Natural gas power station	2012	Combined-cycle plant under construction; waste hot water from the plant is to be used for industrial greenhouse agriculture

== Geothermal ==
Name	Location	Capacity	Type	Operational	Notes
Meshkinshahr Geothermal Power Plant	Ardabil province	250 MW	Geothermal power station	2010	Iran's first geothermal electricity generation station

== Hydroelectric ==
=== In service ===
Name	Location	Capacity (MW)	Type	Operational	Notes
Shahid Abbaspour Dam (Karun-1)	Khuzestan	2,000	Hydroelectric dam	1976	One of the four large hydroelectric dams on Karun River
Karkheh Dam	Khūzestān	520	Hydroelectric dam	2001	The dam was built by Islamic Revolutionary Guard Corps.
Amir Kabir Dam	Karaj	90	Hydroelectric dam	1961	In addition to power, it provides water for the city of Tehran.
Dez Dam	Khuzestan	520	Hydroelectric dam	1963	
Karun-3 Dam	Khuzestan	2,280	Hydroelectric dam	2005	
Karun-4 Dam	Chaharmahal and Bakhtiari	1,020	Hydroelectric dam	2010	
Masjed Soleyman Dam (Karun-2)	Masjed-Soleyman	2,000	Hydroelectric dam	2002	
Lar Dam, Amol	Mazandaran province	30	Hydroelectric dam	1984	
Latyan Dam	Tehran province	45	Hydroelectric dam	1967	
Kouhrang Dam	Isfahan province	35.1	Hydroelectric dam	2002	
Lavarak Dam	Tehran province	47	Hydroelectric dam	2009	
Shahid Rajaee Dam	Mazandaran province	13.5	Hydroelectric dam	2007	
Shahid Talebi Dam	Fars province	2.3	Hydroelectric dam	1994	In operation
Yasuj Chain Dam	Kohgiluyeh and Boyer-Ahmad province	16.8	Hydroelectric dam	2005	Being upgraded to 25 MW
Shahid Azimi Dam	?	1	Hydroelectric dam		In operation
Piran Dam	Kermanshah province	8.4	Hydroelectric dam	2011	In operation
Jiroft Dam	Kerman province	85	Hydroelectric dam	1993	
Seimareh Dam	Ilam province & Lorestan province	480	Hydroelectric dam	2013	In operation
Rudbar Lorestan Dam	Lorestan province	450	Hydroelectric dam	2017	In operation
Manjil Dam	Gīlān Province	87	Hydroelectric dam	1962	
Sardasht Dam	West Azerbaijan	150	Hydroelectric dam	2018	
Khoda Afrin Dam	East Azerbaijan	102	Hydroelectric dam	2010	On border with disputed territories
Zayanderud Dam	Isfahan province	55	Hydroelectric dam	1971	
Rais Ali Dilavari Dam	Bushehr province	70	Hydroelectric dam	2008	
Mulla Sadra Dam	Fars province	100	Hydroelectric dam	2007	
Doroodzan Dam	Fars province	10	Hydroelectric dam	1973	
Marun Dam	Khuzestan	151	Hydroelectric dam	1976	
Talaqan Dam	Qazvin province	18	Hydroelectric dam	2006	
Gavoshan Dam	Kurdistan province	11	Hydroelectric dam	2004	
Upper Gotvand Dam	Khuzestan province	1,000	Hydroelectric dam	2012, 2015 (?)	Phase 1 was operational in 2012. Phase 2 will add 1,000 MW.
Daryan Dam	Kermanshah province	210	Hydroelectric dam	2018	Operational
Salman Farsi Dam	Fars province	13	Hydroelectric dam	2009	
Ardeh Dam	Gilan province	0.125	Run-of-the-river	1991	The hydroelectric plant is not connected to the national grid.
Darreh Takht Power Plant	Lorestan province	1.6	Run-of-the-river	1986, 2000	Operational
Micro Power Plants		227	Run-of-the-river	2004	Operational; five power plants nationwide

=== Proposed or under construction ===
Name	Location	Capacity	Type	Operational	Notes
Bakhtiari Dam	Lorestān Province	1,500	Hydroelectric dam	2018 (??)	The dam is currently under construction. Upon completion it will become the world's tallest dam at 325 meters.
Iran–Turkmenistan Friendship Dam	Border of Iran & Turkmenistan	16	Hydroelectric dam		The dam is operational since 2005. Installation of power units on the dam is being negotiated between the two countries.
Khersan-3 Dam	Chaharmahal and Bakhtiari	400	Hydroelectric dam	2015 (??)	Under construction
Joreh Dam	Khuzestan province	48	Hydroelectric dam	2011 (??)	Under construction
Sarrud Dam		65	Hydroelectric dam		Under construction
Tarik Dam	Gilan province	2.8	Hydroelectric dam	2016 (??)	Dam is operational since 1977; power station is being constructed
Zayanderud Regulatory Dam	Isfahan province	8.5	Hydroelectric dam		Under construction
Aras Watershed Dam	Meghri	260	Hydroelectric dam	2017 (??)	Under construction
Zalaki Dam		466	Hydroelectric dam		Feasibility study
Liro Dam		324	Hydroelectric dam		Feasibility study
Sezar 4-1 Dam		265	Hydroelectric dam		Feasibility study
Dez 3-1 Dam		930	Hydroelectric dam		Feasibility study
Hajghalandar Dam		80	Hydroelectric dam		Feasibility study
Chambastan Dam		135	Hydroelectric dam		Feasibility study
Namarestagh Dam		33.5	Hydroelectric dam		Feasibility study
Sardabrud Dam		20	Run-of-the-river		Feasibility studies completed in 2009
Gulestan Dam		5.6	Run-of-the-river		Feasibility studies completed in 2009
Pir Taghi Dam		240	Hydroelectric dam		Feasibility study
Namhil Dam		496	Hydroelectric dam		Feasibility studies completed
Pavehrud Dam		250	Hydroelectric dam		Feasibility studies completed
Kalat Dam		292	Hydroelectric dam		Feasibility study
Khersan-2 Dam		580	Hydroelectric dam		Feasibility study
Khersan-1 Dam		2,638	Hydroelectric dam		Feasibility study
Bazaft Dam		240	Hydroelectric dam		Feasibility study
Karun-3 Axis-3 Dam		1,458	Hydroelectric dam		Feasibility study
Karun-5 Dam		560	Hydroelectric dam		Feasibility study
Karun-2 Axis-8 Dam		1,000	Hydroelectric dam		Feasibility study
Garsha Godar Pir Dam		200	Hydroelectric dam		Feasibility study
Karun Buran Dam		284	Hydroelectric dam		Feasibility study
Tang Mashure Dam		167	Hydroelectric dam		Feasibility study
Sazbon Dam		375	Hydroelectric dam		Feasibility study
Karkheh-2 Dam		118	Hydroelectric dam		Feasibility study
Sazbon Jadid Axis-2 Dam		300	Hydroelectric dam		Feasibility studies completed
Dez Regulator Dam	Khuzestan province	28	Hydroelectric dam		Feasibility study

== Pumped-storage hydroelectric ==
Name	Location	Capacity	Type	Operational	Notes
Siah Bishe Pumped Storage Power Plant	Mazandaran province	Output: 1,040 MW; input: 940 MW	Pumped-storage hydroelectricity	2013–2015	Operational; Iran's first pumped-storage hydroelectric station
Ilam Pump Storage Dam	Ilam province	Output: 1,000 MW	Pumped-storage hydroelectricity		Feasibility study
Azad Dam	Kurdistan province	10 MW; regeneration: 500 MW	Hydroelectric dam / pumped-storage hydroelectricity	2014	Operational

== Nuclear ==
=== In service ===
Name	Location	Capacity (MW)	Type	Operational	Notes and references
Bushehr Nuclear Power Plant	Bushehr	915	VVER	2010-07-01	Originally Bushehr Nuclear Power Plant was planned to have two German-built Konvoi type PWR reactors, each with an electricity generating capacity of 1300 MW. Bushehr-1 reactor achieved commercial operation in September 2013.

=== Under construction ===
Name	Location	Capacity (MW)	Type	Operational	Notes
IR-40	Arak	40	Heavy water reactor	NA	This is a thermal reactor designed to produce power and isotopes. It is Iran's first indigenously built nuclear reactor.
Darkhovin Nuclear Power Plant	Darkhovin	360	Heavy water reactor	NA	Construction of Darkhovin Nuclear Power Plant began in 2008. It is to be built based on indigenous technologies developed for IR-40, and is scheduled to come online in 2016.

== Solar ==
=== In service ===
With about 300 clear sunny days a year and an average of 2,200 kilowatt-hours of solar radiation per square meter, Iran has a great potential to tap solar energy.

Name	Location	Capacity	Type	Operational	Notes
Yazd solar thermal power plant	Yazd	17 MW	Integrated solar combined cycle	2009	Yazd solar thermal power plant is the world's first integrated solar combined cycle power station using natural gas and solar energy. It is the largest solar power plant in the Middle East and the eighth largest in the world.
Shiraz solar power plant	Shiraz	250 KW	Concentrating solar power	2009	Shiraz solar power plant is Iran's first solar power station. It is currently being upgraded to 500 kW.
Mashhad Solar Power Plant	Mashhad	432 KW		2011	36.2713°N 59.6508°E
Malard 365 KW Solar Power Plant	Malard	365 KW	PV solar power plant	2014	Malard Solar Power Plant is the largest grid-tide solar power plant in Iran by the Atrin Parsian Solar and Biomass Co.
Hamedan	Hamedan, Iran	14 MW	Photovoltaic power station	2017	100 MW capacity of renewable energy power plants which were planned to be installed by the private sector in 206-2017, for the moment 50 MW are under construction and the rest will be completed by the end of March 2017
Isfahan	Isfahan, Iran	10 MW	Photovoltaic power station	2017	Isfahan – Jarghoyeh Sofla
Arak	Arak, Iran	1 MW	Photovoltaic power station	2017	
Abhar Razi Power Plant	Abhar, Ian	110 KV	Photovoltaic power station	2017	Abhar Razi solar power plant is Iran's first private sector power plant. It is currently being upgraded to 7 MW.
Mahan	Kerman	20 MW	Photovoltaic power station	2017	

=== Under construction ===
Name	Location	Capacity (MW)	Type	Operational	Notes
Qazvin PV Solar Power Plant	Qazvin, Iran	1000	Photovoltaic power station	2025–2026	It will be an array of 100 PV solar power stations, each with a nominal capacity of 100MW.
Hamedan	Hamedan, Iran	100 MW	Photovoltaic power station	2017	100 MW capacity of renewable energy power plants which were planned to be installed by the private sector in 2016–2017, for the moment 50 MW are under construction and the rest will be completed by the end of March 2017
Isfahan	Isfahan, Iran	50 MW	Photovoltaic power station	2017	Isfahan – Jarghoyeh Sofla
Mahan	kerman	100 MW	Photovoltaic power station	2018	Kerman – Mahan[130]

== Wind ==
Name	Location	Capacity	Type	Operational	Notes
Binalood wind farm	Razavi Khorasan province	28.2 MW	Onshore wind farm	2008	The wind farm uses 43 units of 660 kW. It is currently being upgraded to 93 turbine units with a total capacity of 61.2 MW.
Manjil and Rudbar Wind Farm	Gilan province	100.8 MW	Onshore wind farm	1994	The wind farm uses 171 units of 300–660 kW turbines. It was the first wind farm in Iran.
Kahak wind farm(MAPNA Renewable Generation Company)	Qazvin province	55 MW	Onshore wind farm	2014	The wind farm uses 10 units of 2.5 MW. It is currently being developed to 40 turbine units with a total capacity of 100 MW.
Tarom (Siahpoush) wind farm(Arian Mah Baad co.)	Qazvin province	200 MW	Onshore wind farm	2018	Currently in first phase, 18 WTGs (each unit capacity is 3.400 MW) were installed with a total capacity of 61.2 MW.

== Others ==
Name	Location	Capacity	Type	Operational	Notes
Qazvin hydrogen power plant	Qazvin province	200 KW	Photoelectrochemical cell / fuel cell	2009	The plant is based on the idea of hydrogen economy, using photoelectrochemical cells to produce hydrogen for electricity generation in fuel cells.
Shahid Esmaili power plant	Tehran province	7 MW	Combined heat & power (CHP) system	—N/a	CHP is a system that involves the recovery of waste heat from power generation to form useful energy for other purposes such as heating. The system increases the efficiency of the power plant to more than 1.5 times that of traditional power plants.

== Decentralized power generation ==
In addition to the above power plants, there was 1800 MW cumulative installed capacity in 2011, which belonged to small -scale decentralized power plants, some of which were not connected to the national grid, and many being privately built and run. This capacity is planned for increase to more than 10,000 MW with emphasis on renewable energy and trigeneration. Similarly, there was 418 MW of capacity belonging to diesel-based plants supplying hard-to-reach areas.

== See also ==
- Iranian Economic Reform Plan
- Energy in Iran
