= Tarik Dam =

Dam in Gilan, Iran

- Interactive map of Tarik Dam
- Official name: سد تاریک
- Location: Rasht, Iran
- Purpose: Regulation, irrigation, power
- Status: Operational
- Opening date: 1977
- Owner: Gilan regional water authority

Dam and spillways
- Type of dam: Barrage, concrete with embankment wing dams
- Impounds: Sefīd-Rūd
- Height: 22 m (72 ft)
- Length: 380 m (1,247 ft)
- Spillway type: Nine gates

Power Station
- Commission date: 2016 est.
- Hydraulic head: 8.5 m (28 ft) (rated)
- Turbines: 2 x 1.4 MW Kaplan-type
- Installed capacity: 2.8 MW
- Annual generation: 6.46 GWh

Tarik Dam (Persian: سد تاریک) is a dam on the Sefīd-Rūd river in the Alborz mountain range, about 32 km (20 mi) south of Rasht in Gilan Province, northern Iran.

It is located 35 km (22 mi) downstream of the Sefidrud Dam. The dam was completed in 1977 to distribute releases from the Sefidrud Dam for irrigation paddy fields and river regulation purposes.

A hydroelectric power station, with an installed capacity of 2.8 MW, was under construction in 2013 as part of the dam's structure.

== Tarik Dam power plant ==
The Kaplan Tarik Dam power plant is a small scale project of the Iran Water Resources and Power Development Company, which was built 35 km downstream of Sefid Rood Reservoir Dam. The purpose of this plan is to produce 46.46 gigawatt hours of energy by controlling the flow of Sefidrud water with the Tarik dam power plant.

== Tarik dam forest park ==
One of the most beautiful sights in Gilan province is Dark dam Forest Park. This park is located on the southern bank of the Sefid Rood River, near Tarik Dam. One of the most beautiful sights of this park is a rainbow of dark green, red, yellow and purple colors in autumn. The green vegetation of the forest in all seasons is another characteristic of this forest. Among the animals found in this climate, we can mention badger, jackal, forest turtle, red breast, and woodpecker.

== See also ==
- Dams in Iran
- List of power stations in Iran
- Sefidrud Dam
