= Shiraz Solar Power Plant =

Concentrating solar power of Iran

- Country: Iran
- Location: Shiraz
- Commission date: December 2008

Solar farm
- Type: CSP
- CSP technology: Parabolic trough

Power generation
- Nameplate capacity: 250 KW

Shiraz Solar Power Plant is a concentrating solar power type pilot power station situated near Shiraz, Iran. It became operational in 2008. The plant uses concentrating parabolic mirrors to focus a beam of light on a tower making steam for electricity generating turbines. It has a capacity of 250 kilowatt (kW). It is a project aimed at developing technologies needed for larger solar power plants, and is currently being upgraded to 500 kW capacity.

== See also ==
- Solar power in Iran
- Yazd solar power station
- List of power stations in Iran
- International rankings of Iran
