= Piran Dam =

- Location within Iran
- Country: Iran
- Location: Piran; Sarpol-e Zahab County; Kermanshah Province
- Coordinates: 34°28′49.29″N 46°00′15.31″E
- Purpose: Hydroelectricity
- Status: Operational
- Construction began: 2008
- Opening date: 2011
- Construction cost: US$15 million
- Owner: IWPCO

Dam and spillways
- Type of dam: Stone and concrete
- Impounds: Piran stream
- Height: 7.5 m (25 ft)
- Length: 25 m (82 ft)

Reservoir
- Total capacity: 15,000 m^{3} (12 acre⋅ft)
- Surface area: 10,000 m^{2} (110,000 sq ft)

Power Station
- Turbines: 2 X 4.2 Pelton turbine
- Installed capacity: 8.4 MW
- Annual generation: 40 GWh

Piran Dam is a stone and concrete hydroelectric dam on the Piran stream located about 6.2 km (3.9 mi) east of Piran in Sarpol-e Zahab County, Kermanshah Province, Iran. The project started in 1989 with the preliminary studies. All studies were carried out by 2000. The main contractor was selected in 2007. Construction of the dam started in 2008 and the dam was inaugurated on 24 November 2011. It cost more than US$15 million.

The dam is 7.5 metres (25 ft) high and 25 metres (82 ft) long. It creates a reservoir with capacity of 15,000 cubic metres (12 acre⋅ft) and surface of 10,000 square metres (110,000 sq ft). The projects includes a 212 metres (696 ft) transfer channel, 1,572 metres (5,157 ft) of siphon pipes, and 800 metres (2,600 ft) outlet channel.

The power plant has installed capacity of 8.4 MW. It has two Pelton turbines manufactured by Ghet Hydro Energy and two generators manufactured by WEG.

== See also ==
- List of power stations in Iran
