= Shiraz Biogas Power Plant =

Biogas powerplant situated in Shiraz, Iran

Shiraz Biogas Power Plant is a biogas powerplant situated in Shiraz, Iran. The plant uses gasification of biomass to produce biofuel for a pilot thermal power station with a capacity of 1.065 MW. The plant was approved in 2001 and construction started on 27 September 2007. The plant which became operational in 2009, can generate more than 8,000 MWh of electricity per year from biodegradable waste.

== See also ==
- List of power stations in Iran
