= Shahid Talebi Dam =

Hydroelectric dam in Fars, Iran

Shahid Talebi Dam is a hydroelectric dam in Iran with an installed electricity generating capability of 2.3 MWh. It is situated in town of Sepidan in Fars province and first came online in 1994, after three years of construction.

== See also ==
- List of power stations in Iran
