= Meshkinshahr Geothermal Power Plant =

- Country: Iran
- Location: Meshkinshahr
- Coordinates: 38.2564°N 47.7413°E
- Status: Operational
- Construction began: 2001
- Commission date: 2010

Geothermal power station
- Max. well depth: 3,000 m (9,800 ft)

Power generation
- Nameplate capacity: 5 MW

Meshkinshahr Geothermal Power Plant is a geothermal electricity generation station situated near Meshkinshahr, Iran. The plant which has an electricity generation capacity of 5 MW has been under construction since 2001 and came online in 2010, becoming Iran's first geothermal power plant. It uses steam formed by the injected water into specially drilled wells which can be more than 3,000 metres (9,800 ft) deep. The water is heated up, deep in the ground where temperature is above 250 °C (480 °F). The heated up water upon de-pressurization at the surface turns to steam which is then used to power steam turbines for electricity generation. The plant is being further expanded to provide geothermal heating to areas in Ardabil province for both domestic as well as industrial purposes. As power plant is situated in touristic Sabalan area, it is also hoped the nonpolluting nature of the plant will help to preserve the nature and attract more tourism to the area. In long term, Iran plans to use the gained experience with this power plant in installation of up to 12 other geothermal stations in the country.

== See also ==
- List of power stations in Iran
- International rankings of Iran
