= Sefidrud Dam =

Dam in Gilan, Iran

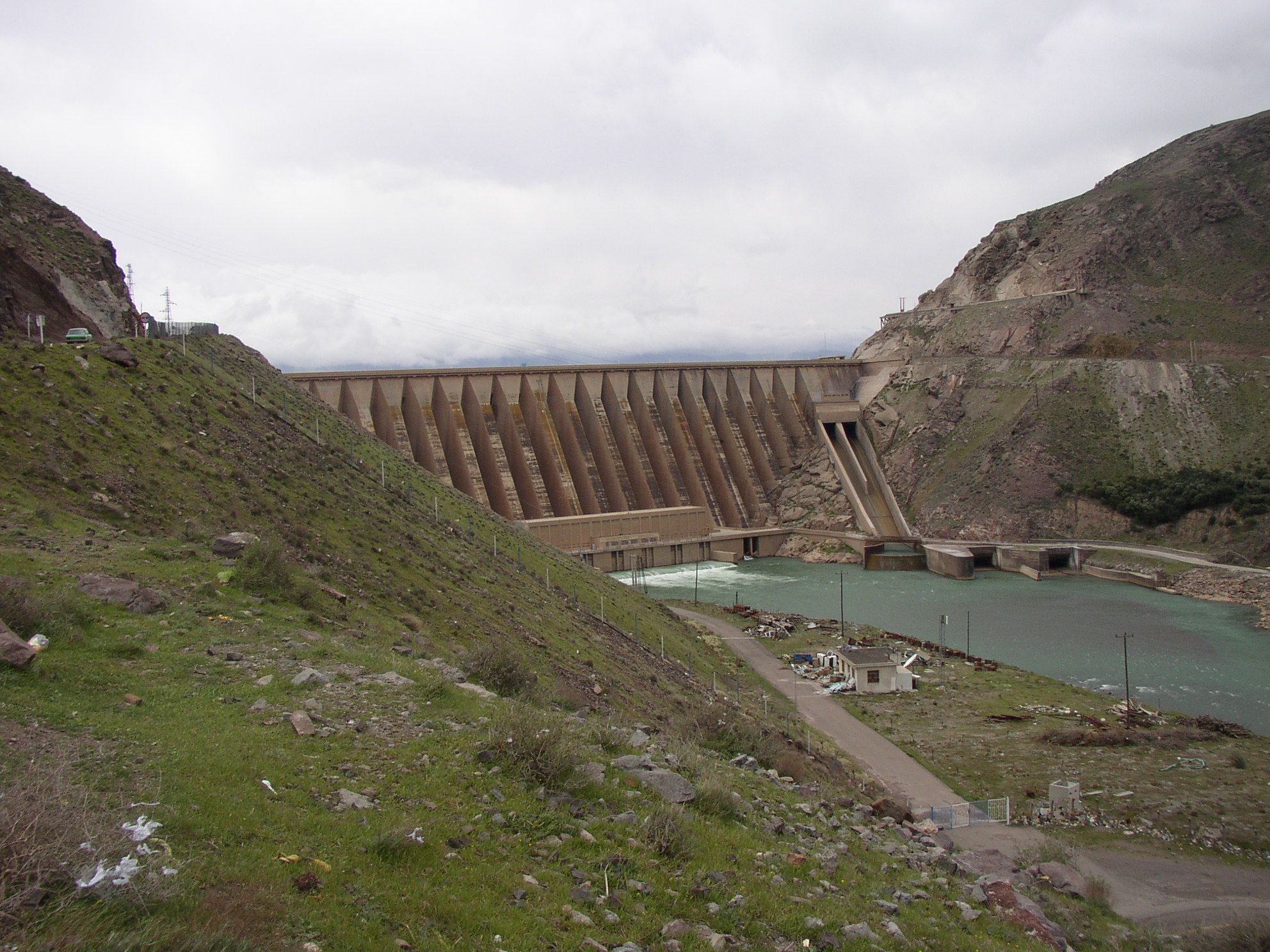
- A view of dam from downstream

- Location within Iran
- Interactive map of Sefidrud Dam
- Location: Manjil, Iran
- Coordinates: 36°45′31.27″N 49°23′16.03″E
- Purpose: Power, Irrigation
- Status: Operational
- Construction began: 1956
- Opening date: 1962
- Owner: Regional Water Company of Gilan

Dam and spillways
- Type of dam: Buttress
- Impounds: Sefīd-Rūd and Shahrud (river)
- Height: 106 m (348 ft)
- Length: 425 m (1,394 ft)
- Width (crest): 8 m (26 ft)
- Width (base): 106 m (348 ft)
- Dam volume: 1,050,000,000 m^{3} (851,249 acre⋅ft)
- Spillway type: Bell-mouth spillway

Reservoir
- Total capacity: 1,765,000,000 m^{3} (1,430,909 acre⋅ft)
- Active capacity: 1,112,000,000 m^{3} (901,513 acre⋅ft)
- Inactive capacity: 653,000,000 m^{3} (529,396 acre⋅ft)
- Catchment area: 56200 km2
- Surface area: 46.16 km^{2} (17.82 sq mi)

Power Station
- Installed capacity: 87 MW
- Website https://glrw.ir/st/67

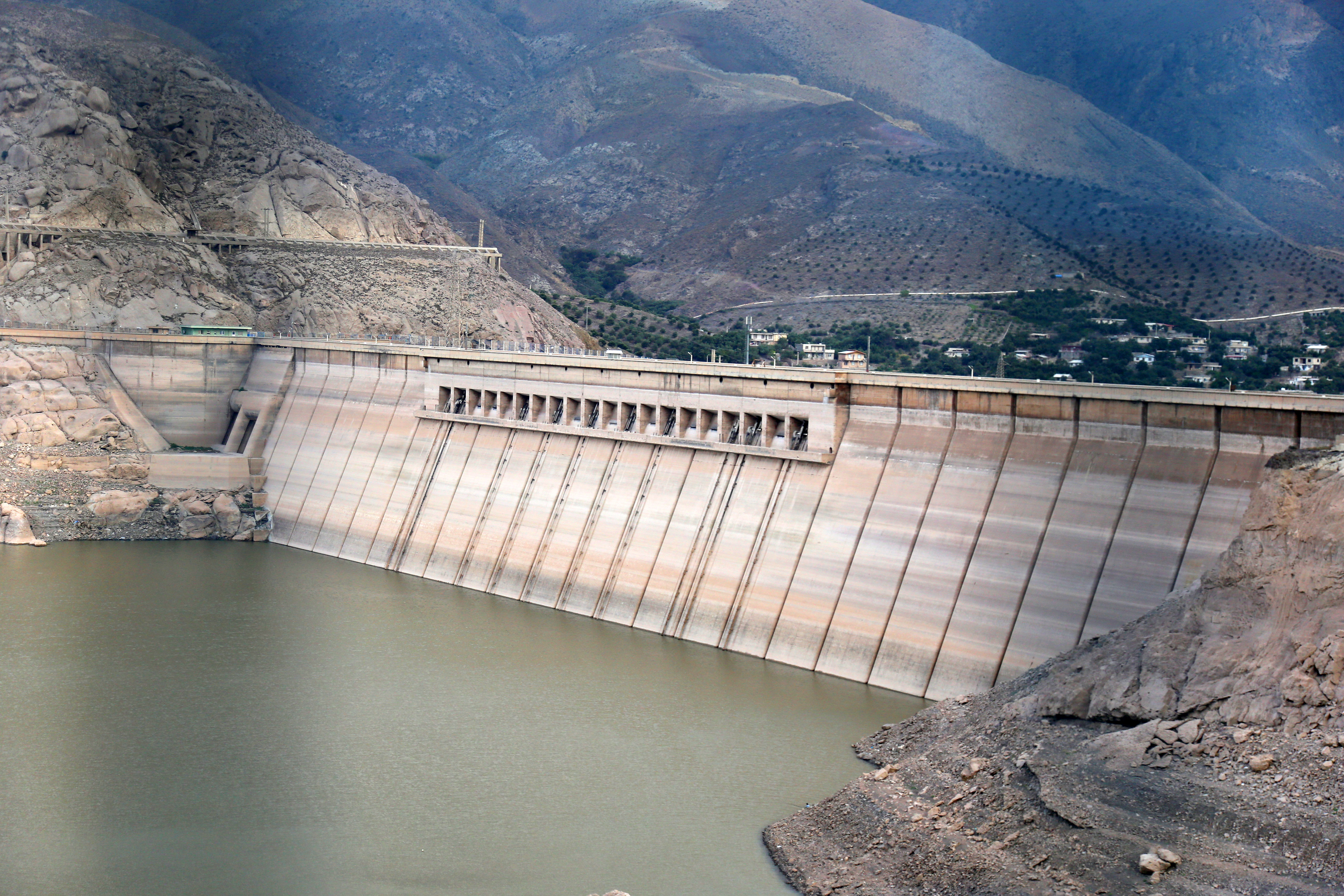
Manjil Dam

Sefidrud Dam (originally named Shahbanu Farah Dam and also known as the Manjil Dam) (Persian: سد سفیدرود) is a buttress dam on the Sefīd-Rūd in the Alborz mountain range, located near Manjil in Gilan Province, northern Iran.

It was constructed to store water for irrigation and hydroelectric power generation. The power station has an installed capacity of 87.5 MW. It is 106 m (348 ft) tall and forms a reservoir with a capacity of 1.82 km^{3} (1,475,498 acre⋅ft). Its structure contains 26 monoliths.

The Tarik Dam is located 35 km (22 mi) downstream and diverts releases from the Sefidrud Dam for irrigation.

The extremely destructive 1990 Manjil–Rudbar earthquake occurred near the dam and caused portions of its concrete to crack. Repairs and mitigation efforts were undertaken in 1991.

== See also ==
- Dams in Iran
- List of power stations in Iran
- Tarik Dam

== Gallery ==
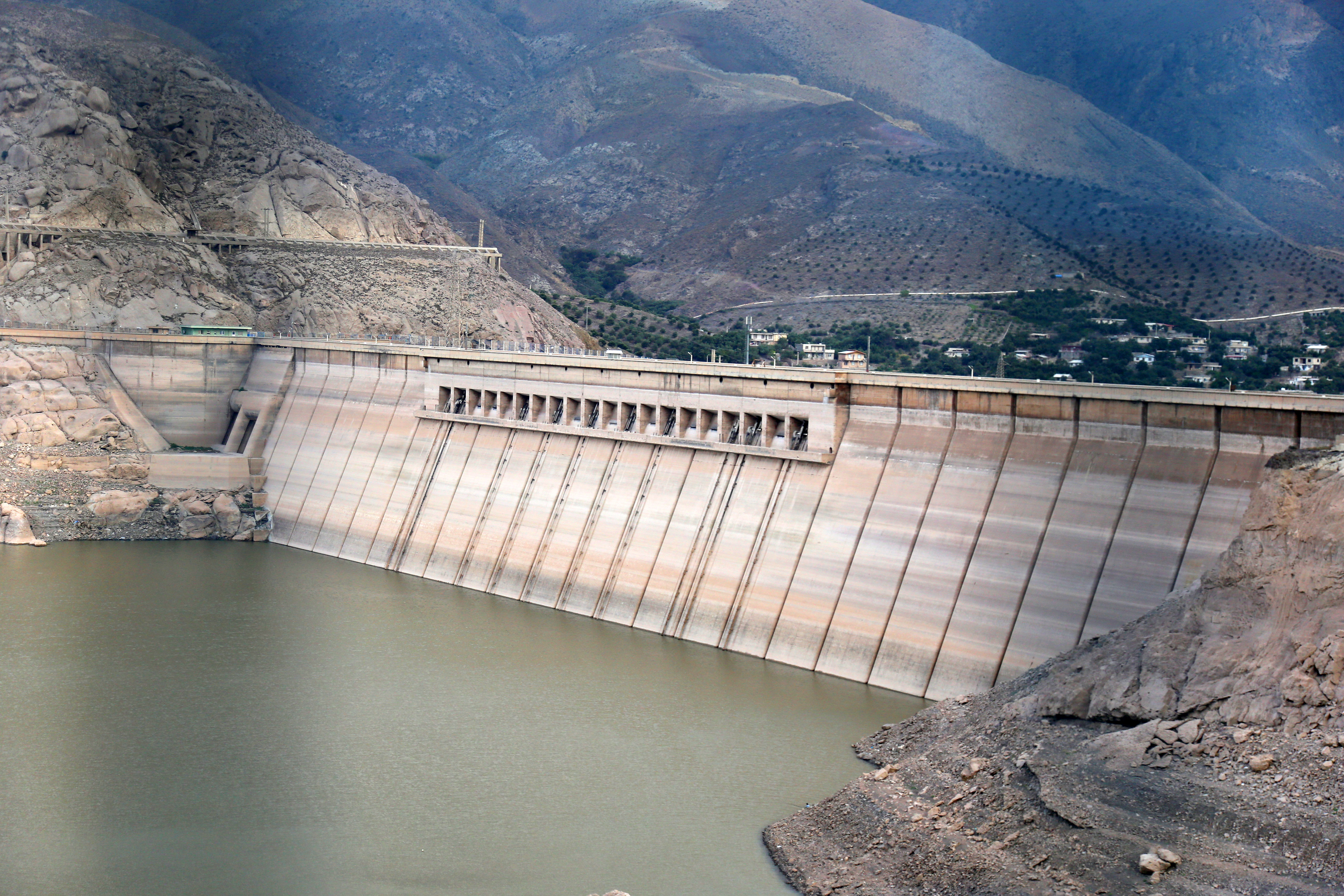
Manjil Dam

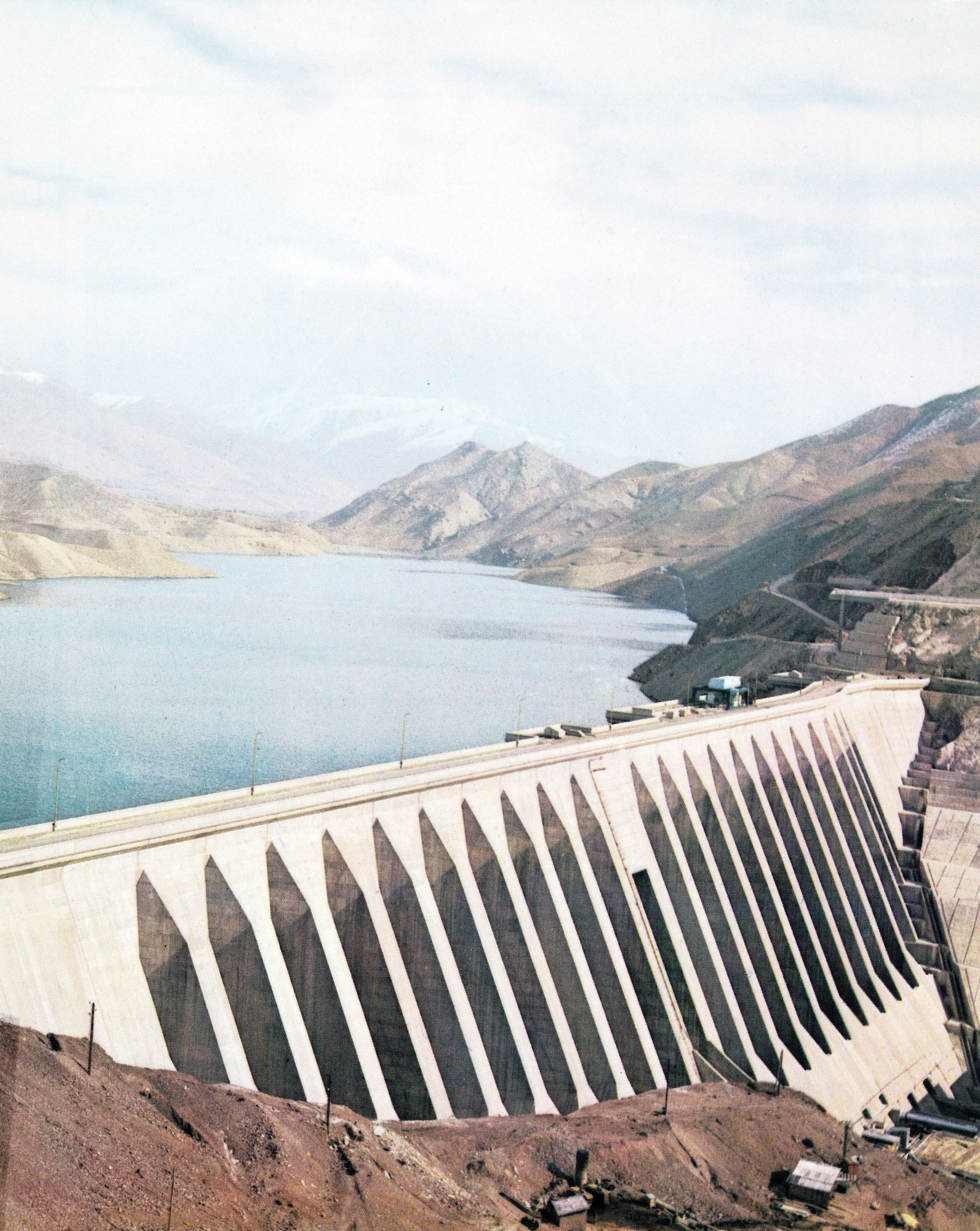

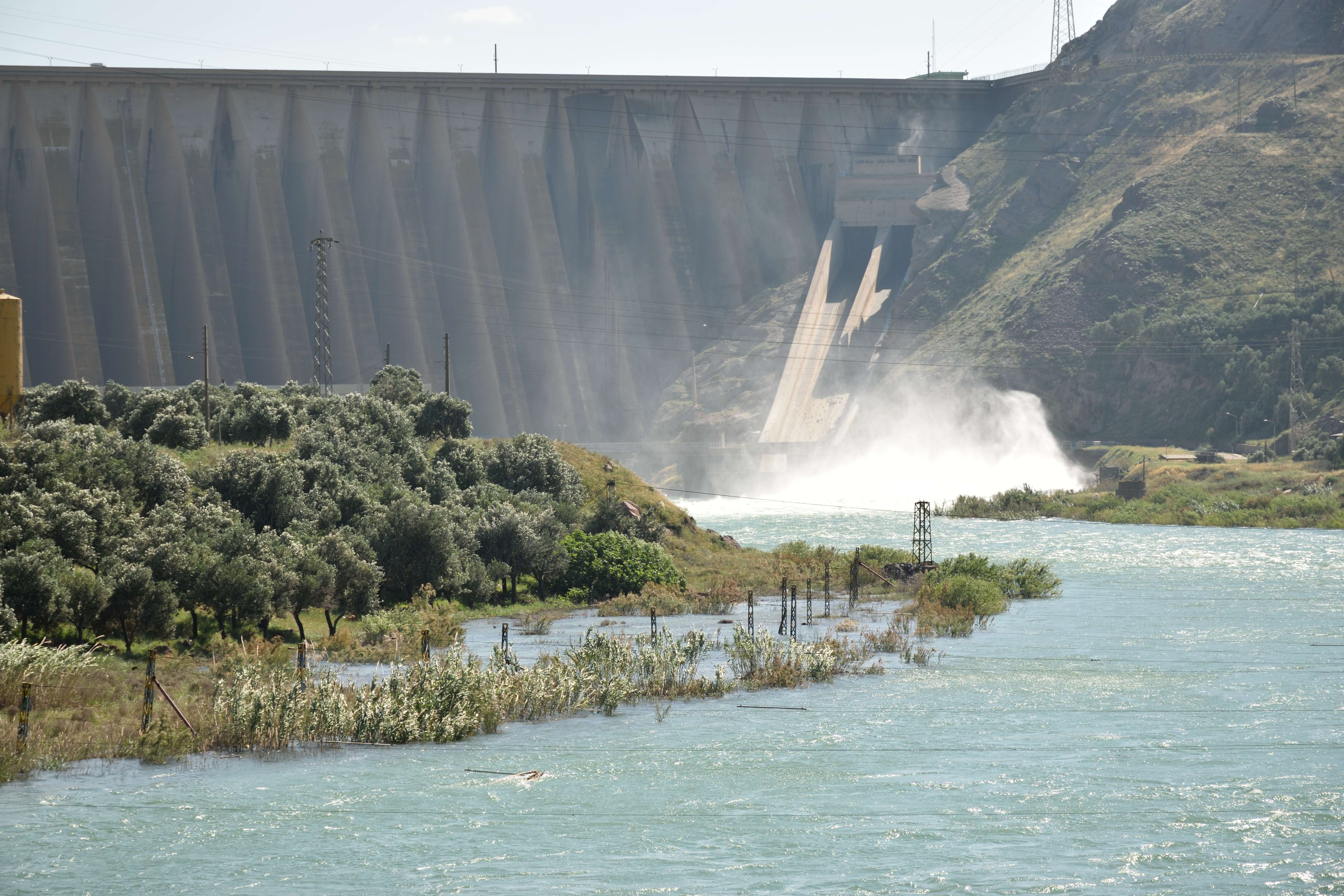

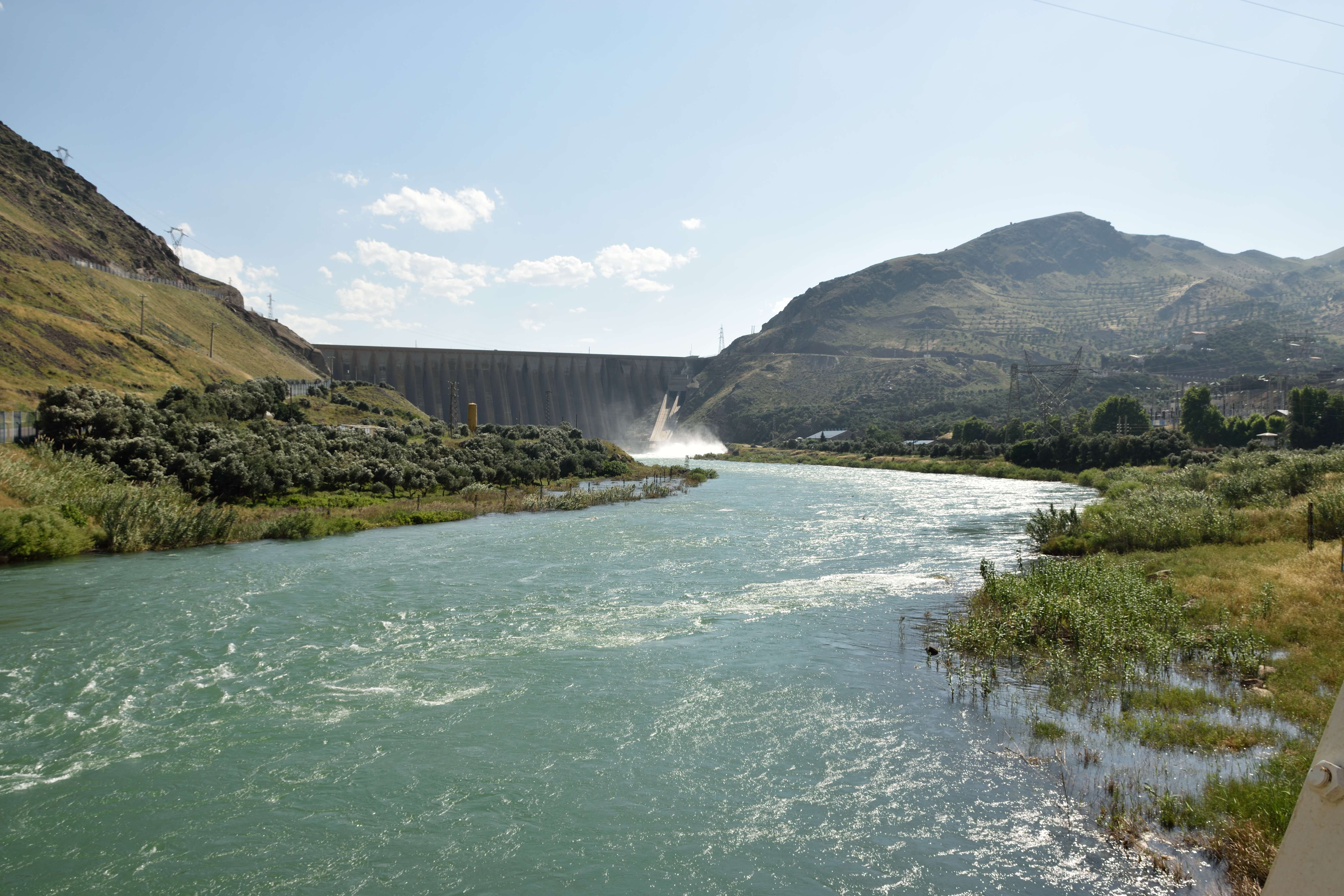

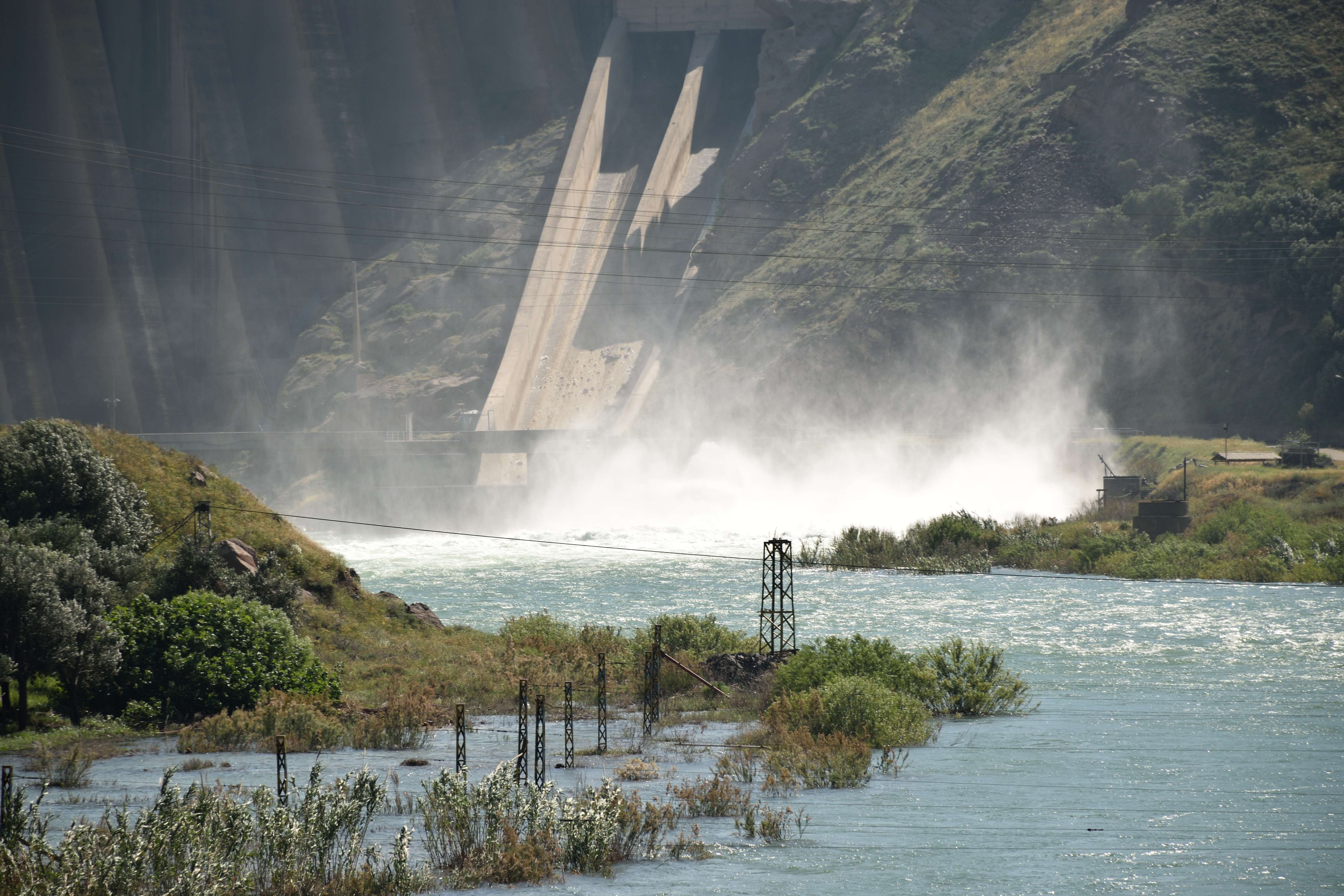
