= Yasuj Chain Dam =

Collection of dams near Sisakht, Iran

Yasuj Chain Dam is a collection of small hydroelectric dams in Iran with a current installed electricity generating capability of 16.8 MW. The complementing system of 9 run-of-the-river hydroelectricity plants is situated near the town of Sisakht in Kohgiluyeh and Boyer-Ahmad Province. The system which first came online in 2005, is currently being upgraded to 25 MW capacity.

== See also ==
- List of power stations in Iran
