= Manjil =

City in Gilan province, Iran

Manjil Persian: منجيل
- City
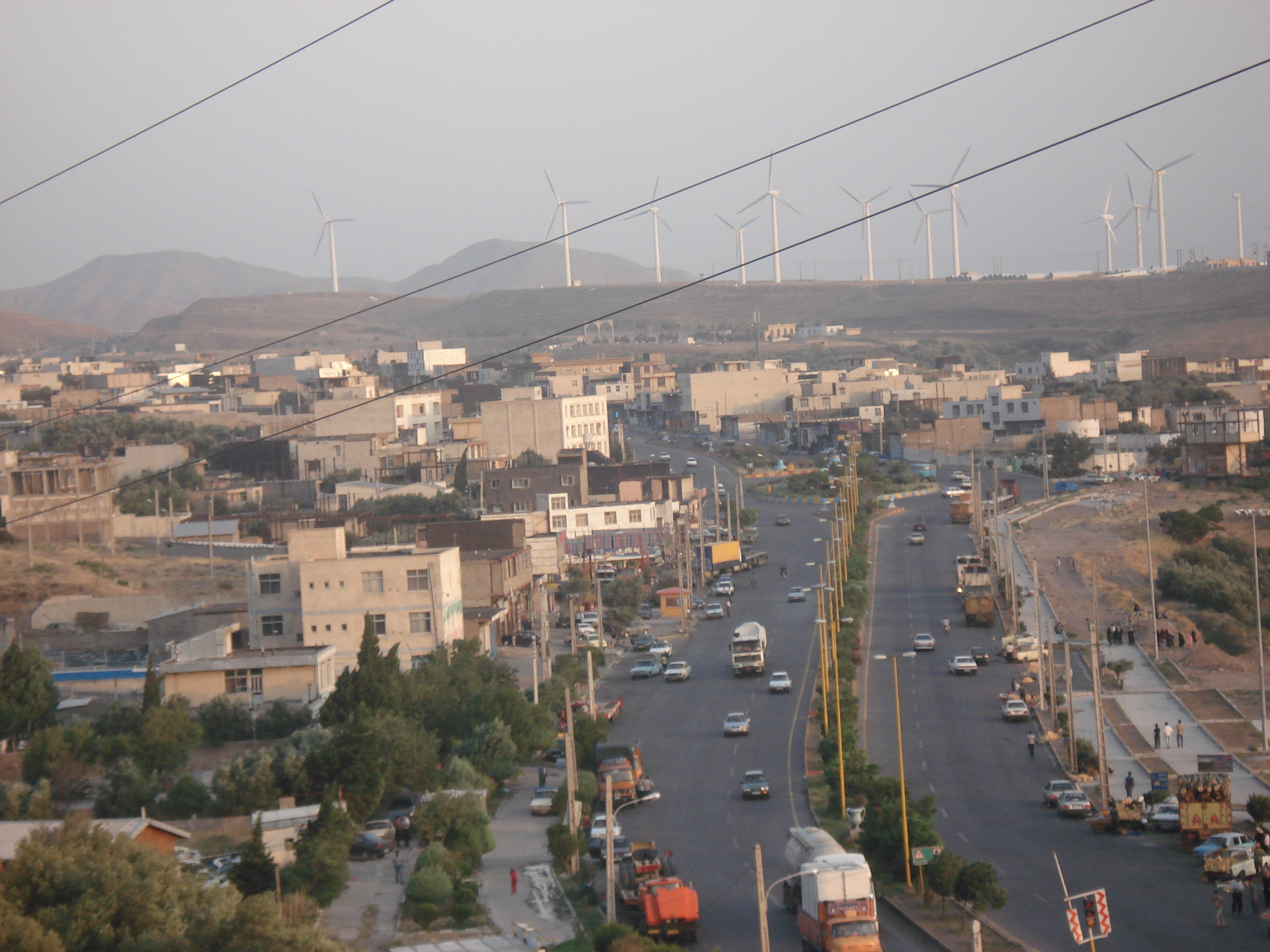
- A view of modern Manjil; the wind power generators are seen in the background

- Location within Iran
- Coordinates: 36°44′41″N 49°24′05″E
- Country: Iran
- Province: Gilan
- County: Rudbar
- District: Central

Population (2016 Census)
  - Total: 15,630
- Time zone: UTC+3:30 (IRST)

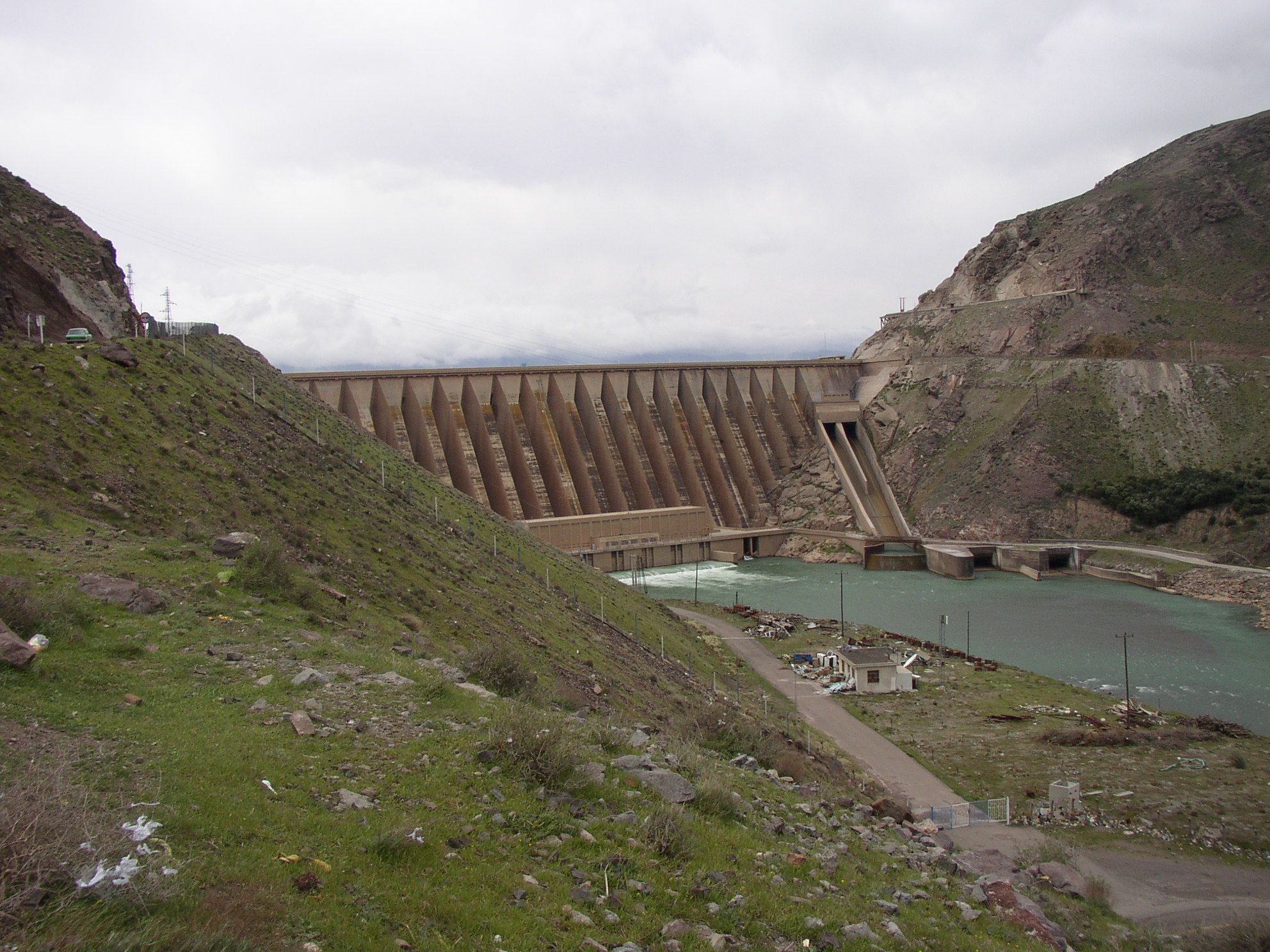
Sefidrood Dam in Manjil

Manjil (Persian: منجيل) (Note: Also romanized as Manjīl and Menjīl; derived from Manzil) is a city in the Central District of Rudbar County, Gilan province, Iran.

== History ==
Throughout its history Manjil has been a gate to the southern Caspian Sea region. There are numerous archaeological site excavations (mostly illegal) in the Manjil area because of its rich cultural history. Some of these sites are related to the Ismaili era, i.e., Hassan Sabbah movement based in Alamoot forte (one may find artifacts from the 3rd-2nd millennia BC in some households).

=== Modern history ===
In the modern era, Manjil was the site of a historical battle between the nationalist revolutionary forces of Jangal (led by Mirza Koochak Khan) and the joint British and White Russian forces on June 12, 1918. The latter forces (led by General Dunsterville and Colonel Bicherakhov) willing to pass through Manjil as the only passage to the Caspian to reach Baku and overthrow the newly formed Baku Commune (led by Stepan Shahumian). General Dunsterville's private diaries and notes, including those kept during his command of the Dunsterforce Mission to North Persia and Baku, 1918 were transcribed from the original by General Dunsterville's great-granddaughter, and are co-located on the Great War Primary Documents Archive.

Although devastated by a 1990 Manjil–Rudbar earthquake of magnitude 7.3, for the last few decades Manjil has enjoyed industrial and economic growth.

== Demographics ==
=== Language and ethnicity ===
Manjil had a mainly Azerbaijani Turkish population from the ʿAmmārlu tribe, together with Gilaks, Tats and Kurds.

=== Population ===
At the time of the 2006 National Census, the city's population was 16,028 in 4,447 households. The following census in 2011 counted 17,396 people in 5,030 households. The 2016 census measured the population of the city as 15,630 people in 4,950 households.

== Geography ==
Manjil is known as the windy city of Iran, a reputation it owes to its geographical position in the Alborz mountain range at a small cleft in Alborz that funnels the wind through Manjil to the Qazvin plateau. The biggest wind farm of Iran, the Manjil and Rudbar Wind Farm, is located near Manjil.

Manjil is known for the river Sefīd-Rūd (or "Sepid Rood", "Sefid Rood", "white river"). It passes by the town and is formed in Manjil by two joining rivers. Since 1960 it has been the site of the Manjil Dam that significantly contributes to Gilan's agriculture, such as its olive groves, while generating electric power. The reservoir impounded by the Manjil Dam adds to the beauty of the area.

Climate data for Manjil(1993-2010 normals)
| Month | Jan | Feb | Mar | Apr | May | Jun | Jul | Aug | Sep | Oct | Nov | Dec | Year |
|---|---|---|---|---|---|---|---|---|---|---|---|---|---|
| Mean daily maximum °C (°F) | 11.9 (53.4) | 13.8 (56.8) | 17.6 (63.7) | 22.3 (72.1) | 26.4 (79.5) | 29.6 (85.3) | 31.4 (88.5) | 32.2 (90.0) | 28.9 (84.0) | 24.9 (76.8) | 18.4 (65.1) | 13.6 (56.5) | 22.6 (72.6) |
| Daily mean °C (°F) | 7.3 (45.1) | 8.9 (48.0) | 12.1 (53.8) | 16.7 (62.1) | 21.0 (69.8) | 24.8 (76.6) | 27.2 (81.0) | 27.7 (81.9) | 24.1 (75.4) | 19.7 (67.5) | 13.5 (56.3) | 9.2 (48.6) | 17.7 (63.8) |
| Mean daily minimum °C (°F) | 2.8 (37.0) | 3.9 (39.0) | 6.6 (43.9) | 11.1 (52.0) | 15.6 (60.1) | 20.1 (68.2) | 23.0 (73.4) | 23.3 (73.9) | 19.3 (66.7) | 14.5 (58.1) | 8.5 (47.3) | 4.8 (40.6) | 12.8 (55.0) |
| Average precipitation mm (inches) | 18.2 (0.72) | 20.4 (0.80) | 29.5 (1.16) | 41.5 (1.63) | 21.9 (0.86) | 3.8 (0.15) | 2.7 (0.11) | 0.5 (0.02) | 2.2 (0.09) | 11.8 (0.46) | 31.7 (1.25) | 24.1 (0.95) | 208.3 (8.2) |
| Average snowy days | 2.8 | 3.3 | 0.7 | 0.1 | 0 | 0 | 0 | 0 | 0 | 0 | 0.2 | 0.8 | 7.9 |
| Average relative humidity (%) | 64 | 61 | 60 | 61 | 60 | 55 | 52 | 56 | 62 | 64 | 66 | 66 | 61 |
Source: IRIMO(Temperatures)(Precipitation)(Humidity), (snow/sleet days)

== See also ==
Media related to Manjil at Wikimedia Commons
