= Taleghan solar hydrogen energy system =

- Country: Iran
- Location: Qazvin Province
- Coordinates: 36°08′N 50°34′E
- Status: Operational
- Construction began: 2001
- Commission date: 2009
- Owner: SUNA

Thermal power station
- Primary fuel: Hydrogen

Power generation
- Nameplate capacity: 200 KW

The Taleghan solar hydrogen energy system is a stand-alone photovoltaic–hydrogen demonstration project in Taleghan, Qazvin Province, Iran. It is developed by the Renewable Energy Organization of Iran (SUNA).

The demonstration project of the Taleghan solar hydrogen energy system was developed in 1996–2005. It is located at the altitude 1,700 metres (5,600 ft) above sea level. The system consists of a 10 kW photovoltaic array, 3.5 kW electrolysis system with a hydrogen-production capacity of 1 cubic metre per hour (35 cu ft/h), a 0.4 kW proton exchange membrane fuel cell, 60 batteries and a hydrogen storage tank. The initial cost of the system was US$193,563.

Another demonstration project was developed on the site since 2001. It has a total electrical generation capacity of 200 kW. It consist of two electrolysis devices with hydrogen production capacity of 30 cubic metres per hour (1,100 cu ft/h) and 40 cubic metres per hour (1,400 cu ft/h) correspondingly. It produces hydrogen by catalyzing water using solar power. The hydrogen produced is stored in special tanks under pressure. The stored hydrogen can either be used as a fuel on itself or can be converted to electrical energy using Fuel cells, supplying the grid during peak demand hours. The pilot plant is being used to develop hydrogen technologies for larger hydrogen power plants.

== See also ==
- List of power stations in Iran
- Liquid nitrogen economy
- Energy development
- Lithium economy
- Solar fuel
- Methanol economy
- Vegetable oil economy
