= Sefid-Rud =

River in northwestern Iran

Coordinates: 37.4692°N 49.9422°E

Sepidrud Sefidrud
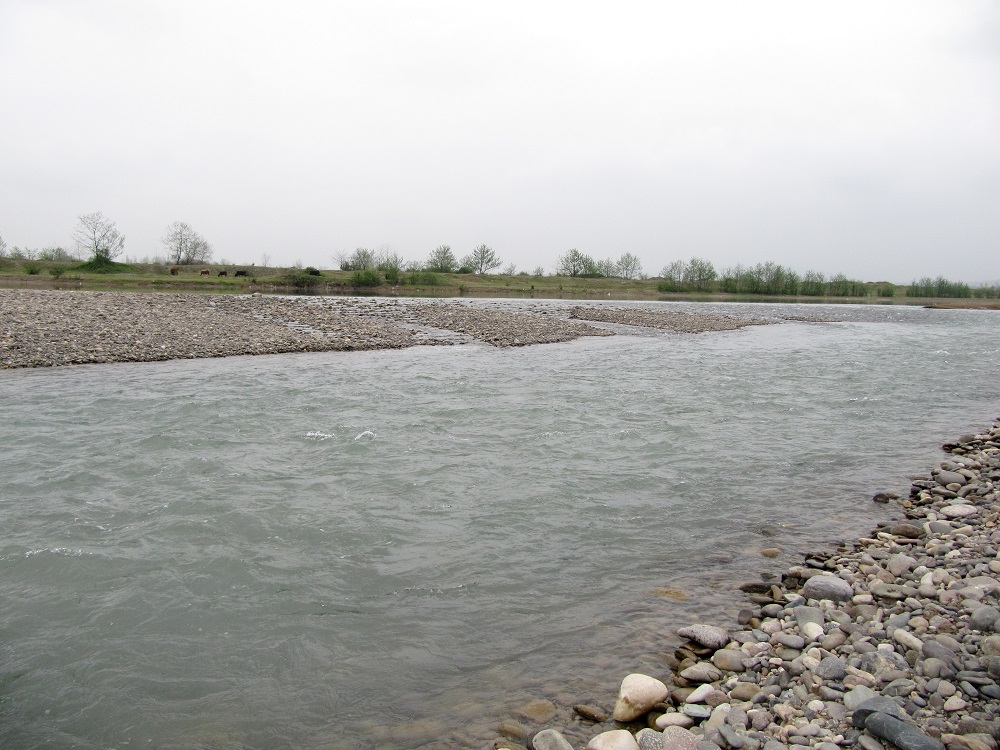

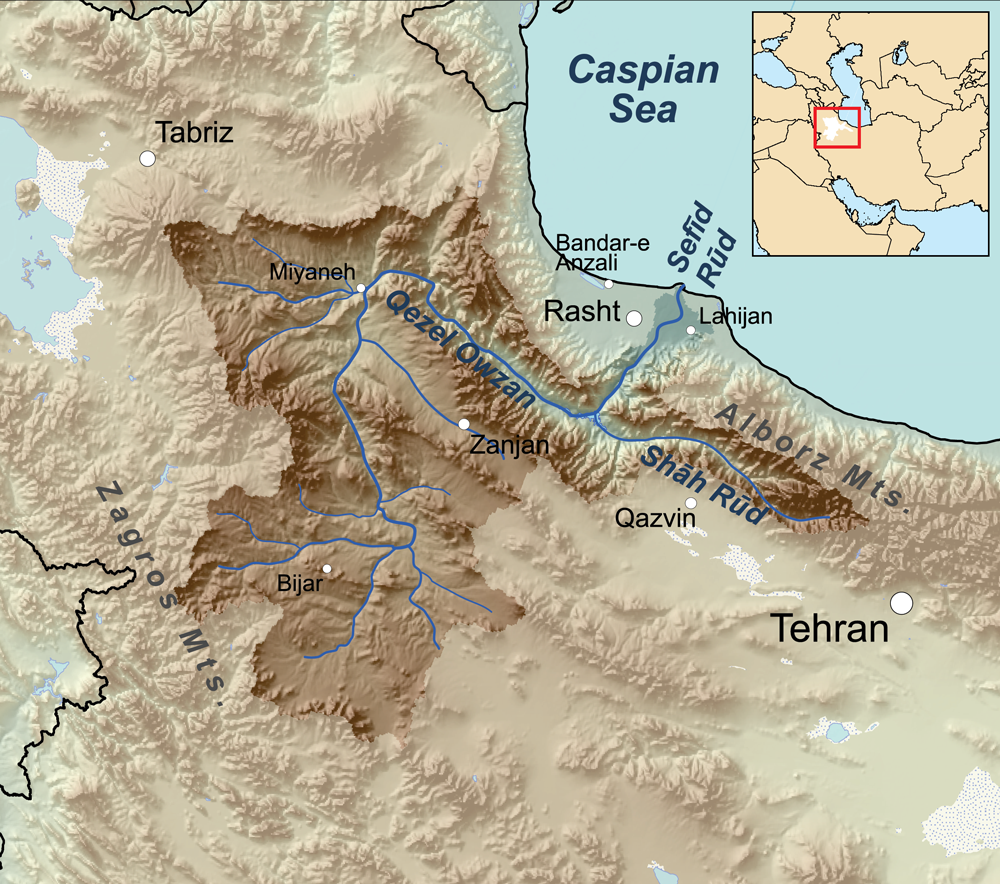
- Sefīd-Rūd drainage basin
- Native name: Sepid-e-Rud (Gilaki)

Location
- Country: Iran
- Provinces: Gilan
- City: Rasht

Physical characteristics
- Source
  - location: Alborz Mountains
- Mouth: Caspian Sea
- Length: 670 km (420 mi)

Basin features
- Tributaries
  - left: Qizil Owzan
  - right: Shahrood

The Espi Bie/Ru (Gilaki: اسپی روٚ کوٚتام/ اسپی بیه سرا or سیوید/سپید/سفید-روٚ /بیه, lit. 'White River') is a river, approximately 670 kilometres (416 mi) long, rising in the Alborz mountain range of north-western Iran and flowing generally north-east to empty into the Caspian Sea at Kiashahr.

== Names ==
Other names and transcriptions include Sepīd-Rūd, Sefidrud, Sefidrood, Sepidrood, and Sepidrud. Above Manjil, "Long Red River".

William Smith equated the river with the Amardus (Ancient Greek: Ἀμάρδος) or Mardus (Μάρδος) river of antiquity.

The river is historically famous for its abundant fish, especially the Caspian trout, Salmo trutta caspius.

== Geography ==
The Sefid-Rud has cut a water gap through the Alborz mountain range, the Manjil gap, capturing its two headwater tributaries, the Qizil Üzan and Shahrood rivers. It then widens the valley between the Talesh Hills and the main Alborz range. The gap provides a major route between Tehran and Gīlān Province with its Caspian lowlands.

In the wide valley before the Sefid-Rud enters the Caspian Sea, a number of transportation and irrigation canals have been cut; the two biggest are the Khomam and the Now.

=== Dam and reservoir ===
The Sefid-Rud was dammed in 1962 by the Shahbanu Farah Dam (later renamed Manjil Dam), which created a 1.86 cubic kilometres (0.45 cu mi) reservoir and allowed the irrigation of an additional 2,380 km^{2} (919 sq mi). The reservoir mediates some flooding and significantly increased rice production in the Sefid Rud delta. The hydroelectric component of the dam generates 87,000 kilowatts. The completion of the dam had a negative impact on the river's fisheries, through reduced stream flow (due to diversion), increased water temperature, and decreased food availability, especially for sturgeon but also for the Caspian trout.

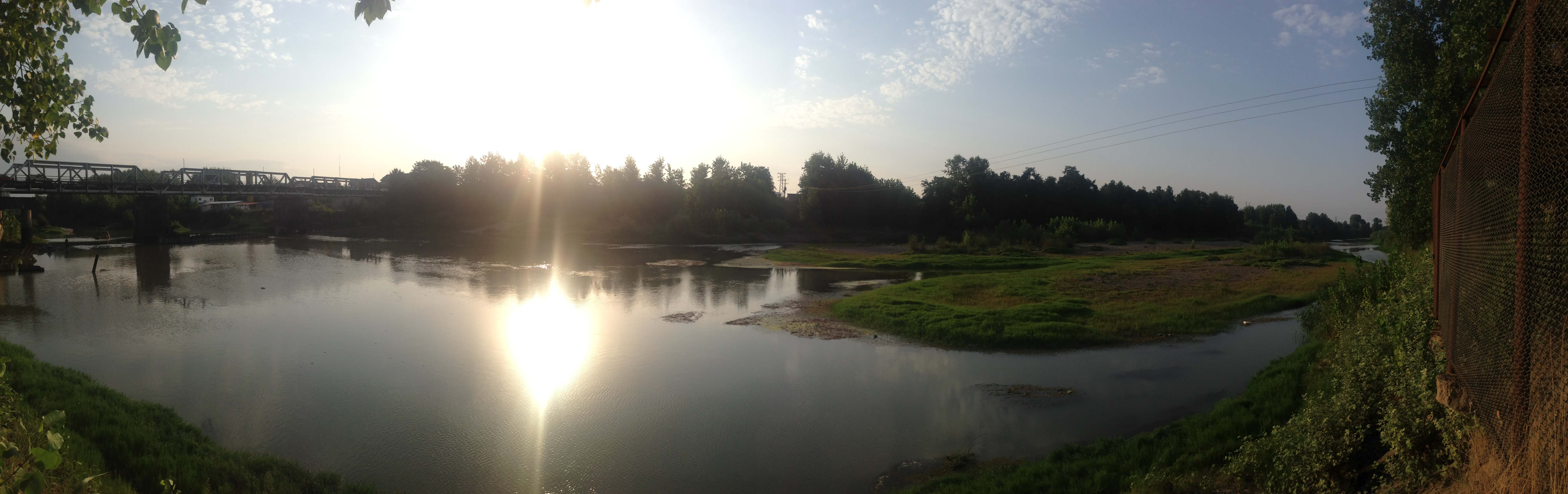
360° View of the Sefīd-Rūd, with bridge on left.

== History ==
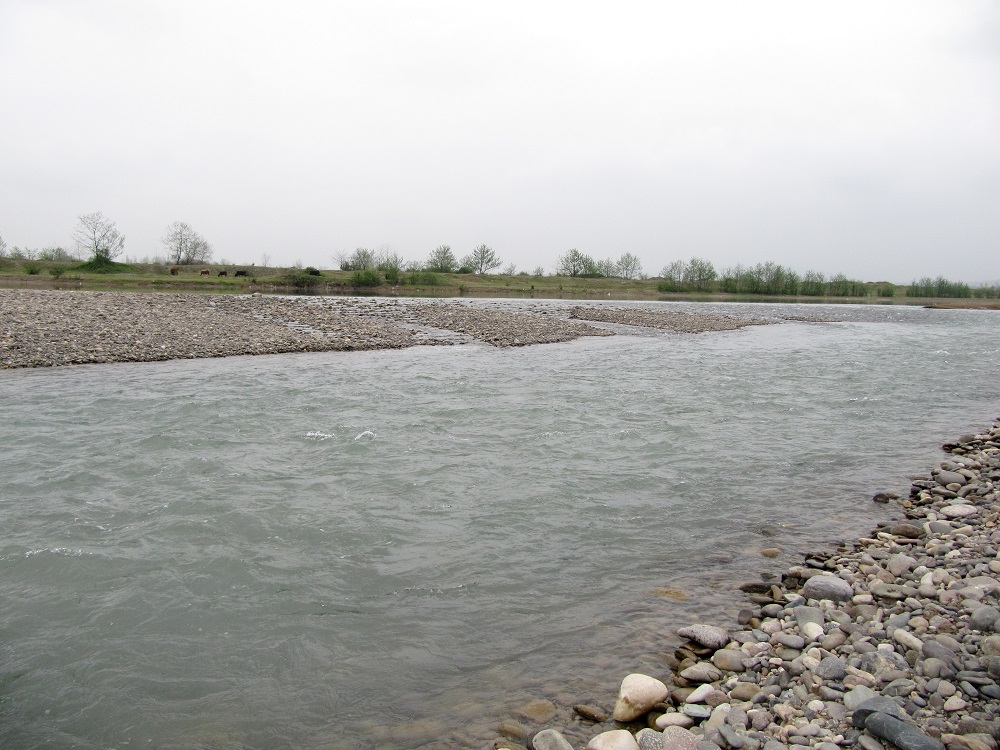
Sefidrood river near Rasht-Iran

The river was known in antiquity as Mardos (Greek: Μαρδος; Latin: Mardus) and Amardos (Greek: Αμαρδος; Latin: Amardus). In the Hellenistic period, the north side of the Sefid (then Mardus) was occupied by the Cadusii mountain tribe .

David Rohl proposes identification of Sefid-Rud with the Biblical Pishon river.

== Gallery ==
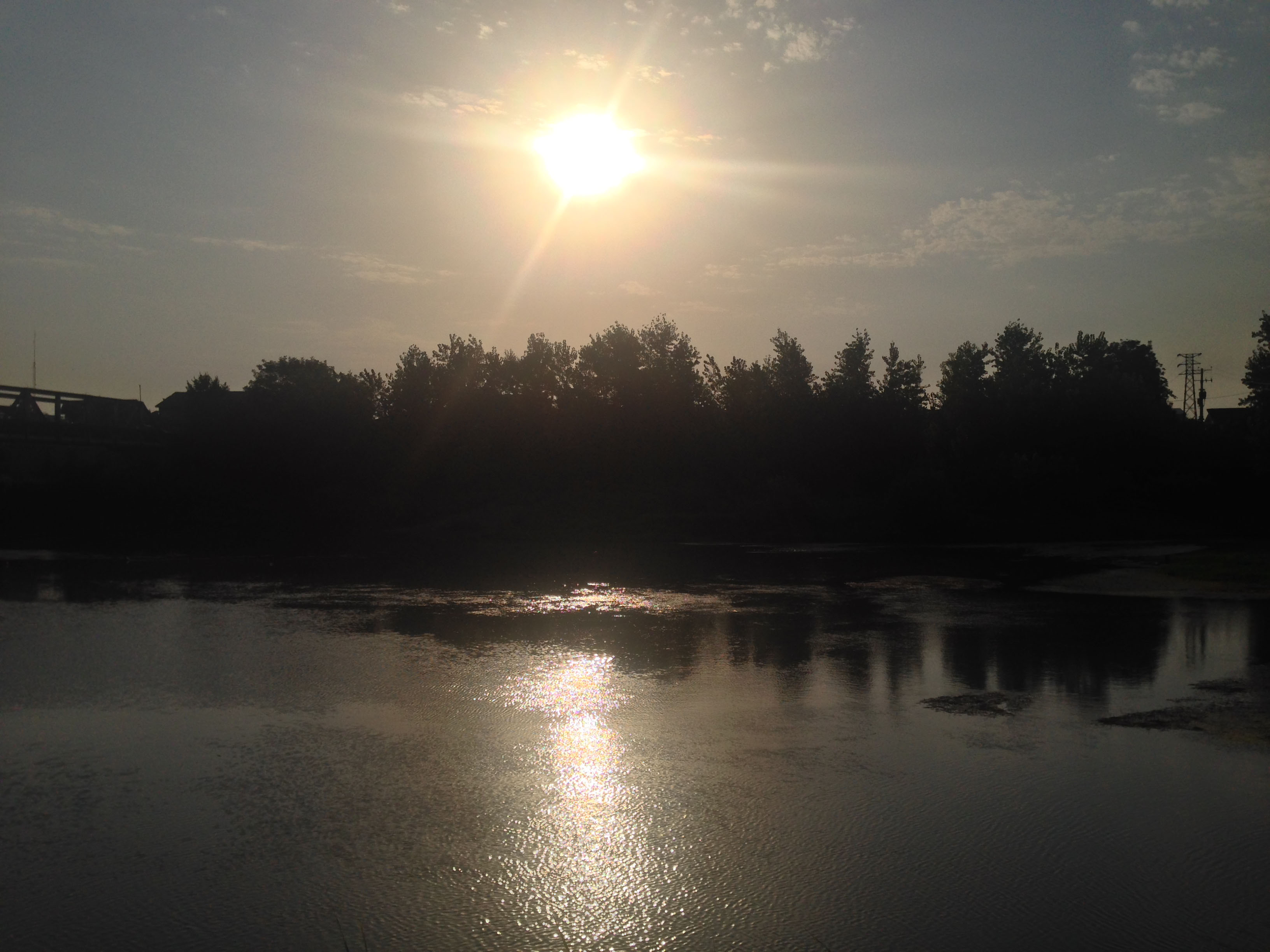

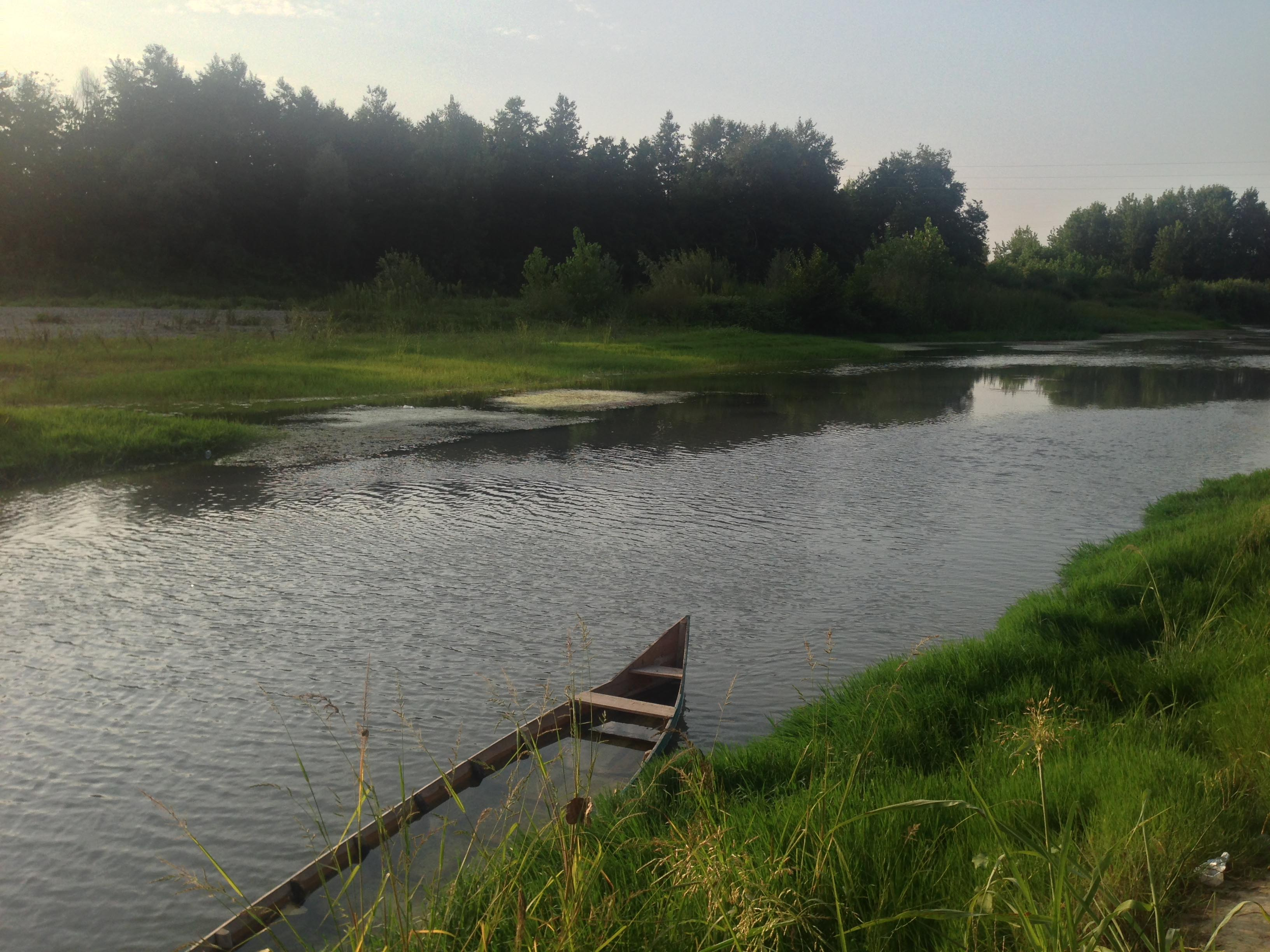
