= Yazd Solar Power Station =

Power station in Yazd Province, Iran

- Country: Iran
- Location: Yazd
- Coordinates: 31°57′11″N 54°04′01″E
- Commission date: 2009
- Operator: MAPNA

Solar farm
- Type: CSP
- CSP technology: Parabolic trough
- Collectors: Doosan; MAPNA

Thermal power station
- Primary fuel: Natural gas
- Secondary fuel: Diesel oil
- Combined cycle?: Yes

Power generation
- Make and model: Alstom; Siemens
- Nameplate capacity: 467 MW

The Yazd Solar Power Station is an integrated solar combined cycle (ISCC) power station situated near Yazd, Iran which became operational in 2009, and in 2011 as a solar integrated plant. The plant has a capacity of 467 MW and uses solar energy to augment its steam generation by concentrating solar power technology.
