= MAPNA Group =

Iranian engineering conglomerate

MAPNA
- Company type: Public company
- Traded as: TSE: MAPN1
- Industry: Conglomerate, Power, Oil & Gas, Railway Transportation
- Founded: 1993; 33 years ago
- Headquarters: Tehran, Iran
- Area served: Worldwide
- Key people: Mohammad Oliya (CEO)
- Products: Power plants; gas and steam turbines, boilers, generators, transformers, auxiliary equipment. Locomotives Power generation technology, industrial and buildings automation, medical technology, railway vehicles, water treatment systems, electric vehicles technologies
- Revenue: ▲US$2.11 billion (2016)
- Number of employees: 15000 (2016)
- Divisions: Power; Oil & Gas; Wagon Pars; Investment; Services; Health; Water; Electrification
- Website: www.mapnagroup.com/en

MAPNA Group (Persian: گروه مپنا) is a group of Iranian companies involved in development and execution of thermal and renewable power plants, oil & gas, railway transportation and other industrial projects as well as manufacturing main equipment including gas and steam turbines, electrical generator, turbine blade and vane, HRSG and conventional boilers, electric and control systems, gas compressor, locomotive and other pertinent equipment.

The company was initially named Iran Power Plant Projects Management Company, MAPNA (Persian: مپنا) serving as the acronym of the Persian title. The full title was dropped in October 2012 following diversification of the holding's activities, with MAPNA becoming the official trademark of the company.

MAPNA was founded in 1993 with the initial aim of becoming a general contractor for thermal power plants but evolved and diversified its business lines and capacities to other industries two decades after its establishment. The group is the first and leading Middle East-based general contractor of thermal power plants in MENA region.

== History ==
Historically, large scale industrial installation in Iran had been supplied by foreign companies on a turn-key basis. The Iran Power Plants Management Company (MAPNA) was founded in February 1993 by Tavanir, IDRO and Saba Investment Co. to manage power projects. The group of companies was instrumental in developing Iranian manufacturing capacity of main and auxiliary equipment for power plants, and of plant construction then. From 2001, the company entered into licensing and technology transfer agreements for gas and steam turbines, turbine blades and vanes, electrical generators, electric and control systems, heat recovery steam generators, compressors and electrical generators as well as railway locomotives.

MAPNA is the largest contractor for steam, gas and combined cycle and renewable power plants in Iran. By 2015, over 100 projects with a total value of €30 billion were either commissioned or under construction by the company. The projects included power generation plants with an installed capacity of more than 48000 MW. In terms of installed capacity, MAPNA's domestic commissioned power projects comprise 46% of Iran's national grid, with a capacity of 35530 MW.^{[3]}

The company holds offices in Indonesia, Iraq and Syria. It has carried out projects in these countries, and also in the Sultanate of Oman.

In 2005, the company was among the top dozen companies on the Tehran Stock Exchange, with a value of over $1 billion. MAPNA was the fourth largest enterprise in Tehran Stock Exchange by June 2010, with a market capitalization of $2.6 billion.^{[4]} Saba, Edalat Brokerage, MAPNA Employees Investment Co. and Ayandeh Negar are key shareholders of the company, collectively holding 90% of the company stock. The remaining 10 percent is in possession of private and legal entity shareholders.

== Company structure ==
As of 2015, the firm is a conglomeration of the parent company with 40 subsidiaries.^{[7]} There are five main group divisions:^{[8]}

Manufacturing MAPNA Turbine Engineering & Manufacturing Co. (TUGA) is a manufacturer of gas and steam turbines for industrial and power applications. MAPNA Turbine Blade Engineering & Manufacturing Co. (PARTO) manufacturers gas turbine hot blades and vanes. MAPNA Generator Engineering & Manufacturing Co. (Pars), and MAPNA Electric & Control Engineering & Manufacturing Co. is involved in the manufacture and design of generators, and control equipment respectively for power plants.

MAPNA Boiler Engineering & Manufacturing Co. (MBC), founded 1999 as MASBA, renamed in 2005, designs, manufactures and installs boilers including HRSG boilers in a technology transfer association with Doosan (S. Korea). The division also includes SEPAHAN Equipment Manufacturing Co. and MAVADKARAN Co.

Alborz Turbine Power Plant Engineering and Support Co. was founded in 2009 as a service provider.

Power. MAPNA Power Plant Construction and Development Company (MD-1), MAPNA Combined Cycle Power Plant Construction and Development Co. (MD-2), and MAPNA Special Projects Construction and Development Company (MD-3) are involved in the construction of gas turbine power plants, combined cycle power plants (i.e. gas turbine plus HRSG), and power plant for petroleum industries. MAPNA Engineering Co. (MONENCO Iran) is a design and consultancy company for utility projects. MONENCO was created as a joint venture between the Montreal Engineering Company and the Iranian state before the 1979 revolution. The government's share was acquired by MAPNA in 1997, whilst Montreal Engineering's share passed to AGRA and then AMEC with that company's acquisition history. NASBNIROO undertakes construction of electrical transmission infrastructure, fuel storage tanks and other construction work.

Investment Projects. The investment project division finances Build-Operate-Transfer (BOT), Build-Operate-Own (BOO), buyback and other investment schemes in the group's general area of business.

Oil and Gas. The oil and gas division was created to extend the group's activities into petroleum plant construction, related engineering and consultancy and manufacturing. The subsidiary Neyrperse Co. is engaged in petroleum industry plant infrastructure (storage tanks, piping) as well as other civil engineering construction projects including bridges, dams, and road construction. Other subsidiaries include MAPNA Oil & Gas Development Co., MAPNA Drilling Co. and Tehran Energy Consultants.

Rail transportation. Mapna Locomotive Engineering and Manufacturing Company was established in 2006 to manufacture passenger locomotives procured under a technology licensing agreement with Siemens. MAPNA Railway Construction & Development Co. and MAPNA Railway Operation & Maintenance Co. are other subsidiaries of the holding in rail division. MAPNA also runs a joint venture with French Faiveley Transport (part of Wabtec since 2015), manufacturing break systems.

Electric vehicles. MAPNA Electric Vehicle and Infrastructure Development Center was established in 2017 and is developing electric cars technologies as well as charging devices and charging stations. In 2020, MAPNA and the Oghab Afshan Group jointly established Parsan Electric Bus Manufacturing Company (SHETAB) in order to design and manufacture electric buses. The company unveiled Shetab Zima, the first Iranian 100% electric bus.

== See also ==
- Energy in Iran
