= Akhund, Iran =

Akhund, Iran (Persian: اخوند) may refer to:

- Akhund, Bushehr, Iran
- Akhund, Khuzestan, Iran

containing the term

- Akhund Mahalleh (disambiguation)
  - Akhund Mahalleh, Ardabil, Iran
  - Akhund Mahalleh, Gilan, Iran
  - Akhund Mahalleh, Mazandaran, Iran
- Akhund Melk, Iran
- Akhund Qeshlaq, Iran
- Akhundi, Iran
- Mal-e Akhund, Iran

== See also ==
- Akhund (disambiguation)
- Akhundzadeh, Iran
