= Seyf Mahalleh =

Seyf Mahalleh سيف محله
- Village
- Location within Iran
- Coordinates: 36°47′26″N 50°49′49″E
- Country: Iran
- Province: Mazandaran
- County: Tonekabon
- Bakhsh: Central
- Rural District: Goli Jan

Population (2006)
  - Total: 341
- Time zone: UTC+3:30 (IRST)
  - Summer (DST): UTC+4:30 (IRDT)

Seyf Mahalleh (Persian: سيف محله, also Romanized as Seyf Maḩalleh and Seyfmaḩalleh) is a village in Goli Jan Rural District, in the Central District of Tonekabon County, Mazandaran Province, Iran. At the 2006 census, its population was 341, in 95 families.
