= Tahrak Mahalleh =

Tahrak Mahalleh طاهرك محله
- Village
- Location within Iran
- Coordinates: 36°49′55″N 50°49′41″E
- Country: Iran
- Province: Mazandaran
- County: Tonekabon
- Bakhsh: Central
- Rural District: Goli Jan

Population (2006)
  - Total: 131
- Time zone: UTC+3:30 (IRST)
  - Summer (DST): UTC+4:30 (IRDT)

Tahrak Mahalleh (Persian: طاهرك محله, also Romanized as Ţāhrak Maḩalleh; also known as Tārīk Maḩalleh) is a village in Goli Jan Rural District, in the Central District of Tonekabon County, Mazandaran Province, Iran. At the 2006 census, its population was 131, in 31 families.
