= Shib Kalayeh =

Shib Kalayeh شعيب كلايه
- Village
- Location within Iran
- Coordinates: 36°41′42″N 50°39′32″E
- Country: Iran
- Province: Mazandaran
- County: Tonekabon
- Bakhsh: Central
- Rural District: Goli Jan

Population (2006)
  - Total: 291
- Time zone: UTC+3:30 (IRST)
  - Summer (DST): UTC+4:30 (IRDT)

Shib Kalayeh (Persian: شعيب كلايه, also Romanized as Shʿīb Kalāyeh; also known as Sīb Kalāyeh) is a village in Goli Jan Rural District, in the Central District of Tonekabon County, Mazandaran Province, Iran. At the 2006 census, its population was 291, in 84 families.
