= Hajjateh =

Hajjateh حاجته
- Village
- Location within Iran
- Coordinates: 36°46′59″N 50°41′25″E
- Country: Iran
- Province: Mazandaran
- County: Tonekabon
- Bakhsh: Central
- Rural District: Goli Jan

Population (2006)
  - Total: 27
- Time zone: UTC+3:30 (IRST)
  - Summer (DST): UTC+4:30 (IRDT)

Hajjateh (Persian: حاجته, also Romanized as Ḩājjateh; also known as Ḩājjatī Bālāband) is a village in Goli Jan Rural District, in the Central District of Tonekabon County, Mazandaran Province, Iran. At the 2006 census, its population was 27, in 8 families.
