= Khezr Konar =

Neighborhood in Mazandaran province, Iran

Khezr Konar Persian: خزركنار
- Neighborhood
- Country: Iran
- Province: Mazandaran
- County: Tonekabon
- District: Central
- City: Shirud

Population (2006)
  - Total: 721
- Time zone: UTC+3:30 (IRST)

Khezr Konar (Persian: خزركنار) (Note: Also romanized as Khezr Konār) is a neighborhood in the city of Shirud in the Central District of Tonekabon County, Mazandaran province, Iran.

== Demographics ==
=== Population ===
At the time of the 2006 census, Khezr Konar's population was 721 in 206 households, when it was a village in Goli Jan Rural District. In 2008, the villages of Bala Shirud, Beramsar, Hemmatabad, Kaseh Gar Mahalleh, Khezr Konar, Kochanak, Lapa Sar, Lashtu, Mian Daj Mahalleh, Mohammadabad, Mojtame-ye Meskuni Farhangian, Pain Shirud, Ramj Mahalleh, Rashidiyeh, Shaghuz Kaleh, Sharifabad, Tamijanak, Vachak, and Zaruj Mahalleh were merged to form the city of Shirud.
