= Charokhchi Mahalleh =

Charokhchi Mahalleh چرخچي محله
- Village
- Location within Iran
- Coordinates: 36°47′10″N 50°49′23″E
- Country: Iran
- Province: Mazandaran
- County: Tonekabon
- Bakhsh: Central
- Rural District: Goli Jan

Population (2006)
  - Total: 97
- Time zone: UTC+3:30 (IRST)
  - Summer (DST): UTC+4:30 (IRDT)

Charokhchi Mahalleh (Persian: چرخچي محله, also Romanized as Charokhchī Maḩalleh) is a village in Goli Jan Rural District, in the Central District of Tonekabon County, Mazandaran Province, Iran. At the 2006 census, its population was 97, in total of 32 families.
