= Shabakhusekul =

Shabakhusekul شبخوس كول
- Village
- Location within Iran
- Coordinates: 36°50′08″N 50°44′57″E
- Country: Iran
- Province: Mazandaran
- County: Tonekabon
- Bakhsh: Central
- Rural District: Goli Jan

Population (2006)
  - Total: 560
- Time zone: UTC+3:30 (IRST)
  - Summer (DST): UTC+4:30 (IRDT)

Shabakhusekul (Persian: شبخوس كول, also Romanized as Shabakhsekūl; also known as Shabakhsegūl) is a village in Goli Jan Rural District, in the Central District of Tonekabon County, Mazandaran Province, Iran. At the 2006 census, its population was 560, in 167 families.
