= Akhun (disambiguation) =

Akhun is a surname.

Akhun may also refer to:

- Akhun, Republic of Bashkortostan, Russia
- Mount Akhun, Russia

== See also ==
- Ahun (disambiguation)
- Akhund (disambiguation)
- Akhunov
