= Nur ol Din Mahalleh =

Nur ol Din Mahalleh نورالدين محله
- Village
- Location within Iran
- Coordinates: 36°51′21″N 50°45′40″E
- Country: Iran
- Province: Mazandaran
- County: Tonekabon
- Bakhsh: Central
- Rural District: Goli Jan

Population (2006)
  - Total: 150
- Time zone: UTC+3:30 (IRST)
  - Summer (DST): UTC+4:30 (IRDT)

Nur ol Din Mahalleh (Persian: نورالدين محله, also Romanized as Nūr ol Dīn Maḩalleh; also known as Nūr od Dīn Maḩalleh) is a village in Goli Jan Rural District, in the Central District of Tonekabon County, Mazandaran Province, Iran. As of the 2006 census, it had a population of 150 people, across 46 families.
