= Karat Chal =

Karat Chal كرات چال
- Village
- Location within Iran
- Coordinates: 36°44′17″N 50°54′58″E
- Country: Iran
- Province: Mazandaran
- County: Tonekabon
- Bakhsh: Central
- Rural District: Goli Jan

Population (2006)
  - Total: 205
- Time zone: UTC+3:30 (IRST)
  - Summer (DST): UTC+4:30 (IRDT)

Karat Chal (Persian: كرات چال, also Romanized as Karāt Chāl) is a village in Goli Jan Rural District, in the Central District of Tonekabon County, Mazandaran Province, Iran. At the 2006 census, its population was 205, in 53 families.
