= Hatam Sara =

Hatam Sara حاتم‌سرا
- Village
- Country: Iran
- Province: Mazandaran
- County: Tonekabon
- Bakhsh: Central
- Rural District: Goli Jan

Population (2006)
  - Total: 117
- Time zone: UTC+3:30 (IRST)
  - Summer (DST): UTC+4:30 (IRDT)

Hatam Sara (Persian: حاتم‌سرا, also Romanized as Ḩātam Sarā) is a village in Goli Jan Rural District, in the Central District of Tonekabon County, Mazandaran Province, Iran. At the 2006 census, its population was 117, in 36 families.
