= Rudbari Konar =

Rudbari Konar رودباري كنار
- Village
- Location within Iran
- Coordinates: 36°48′45″N 50°48′27″E
- Country: Iran
- Province: Mazandaran
- County: Tonekabon
- Bakhsh: Central
- Rural District: Goli Jan

Population (2006)
  - Total: 234
- Time zone: UTC+3:30 (IRST)
  - Summer (DST): UTC+4:30 (IRDT)

Rudbari Konar (Persian: رودباري كنار, also Romanized as Rūdbārī Konār; also known as Rūdbār Konār) is a village in Goli Jan Rural District, in the Central District of Tonekabon County, Mazandaran Province, Iran. At the 2006 census, its population was 234, in 66 families.
