= Aqa Moqim Mahalleh =

Aqa Moqim Mahalleh اقامقيم محله
- Village
- Location within Iran
- Coordinates: 36°48′05″N 50°48′44″E
- Country: Iran
- Province: Mazandaran
- County: Tonekabon
- Bakhsh: Central
- Rural District: Goli Jan

Population (2006)
  - Total: 136
- Time zone: UTC+3:30 (IRST)
  - Summer (DST): UTC+4:30 (IRDT)

Aqa Moqim Mahalleh (Persian: اقامقيم محله, also Romanized as Āqā Moqīm Maḩalleh; also known as Āqā Mogīm Maḩalleh) is a village in Goli Jan Rural District, in the Central District of Tonekabon County, Mazandaran Province, Iran. At the 2006 census, its population was 136, in 40 families.
