= Ahak Chal =

Ahak Chal اهك چال
- Village
- Location within Iran
- Coordinates: 36°48′27″N 50°44′54″E
- Country: Iran
- Province: Mazandaran
- County: Tonekabon
- Bakhsh: Central
- Rural District: Goli Jan

Population (2006)
  - Total: 144
- Time zone: UTC+3:30 (IRST)
  - Summer (DST): UTC+4:30 (IRDT)

Ahak Chal (Persian: اهك چال, also Romanized as Āhak Chāl) is a small village in Goli Jan Rural District, in the Central District of Tonekabon County, Mazandaran Province, Iran. At the 2006 census, its population was 144, in 38 families.
