= Tow Kalleh =

Tow Kalleh توكله
- Village
- Location within Iran
- Coordinates: 36°49′30″N 50°47′18″E
- Country: Iran
- Province: Mazandaran
- County: Tonekabon
- Bakhsh: Central
- Rural District: Goli Jan

Population (2006)
  - Total: 213
- Time zone: UTC+3:30 (IRST)
  - Summer (DST): UTC+4:30 (IRDT)

Tow Kalleh (Persian: توكله) is a village in Goli Jan Rural District, in the Central District of Tonekabon County, Mazandaran Province, Iran. At the 2006 census, its population was 213, in 59 families.
