= Molla Azim Razgah =

Molla Azim Razgah ملاعظيم رزگاه
- Village
- Location within Iran
- Coordinates: 36°46′46″N 50°49′39″E
- Country: Iran
- Province: Mazandaran
- County: Tonekabon
- Bakhsh: Central
- Rural District: Goli Jan

Population (2006)
  - Total: 159
- Time zone: UTC+3:30 (IRST)
  - Summer (DST): UTC+4:30 (IRDT)

Molla Azim Razgah (Persian: ملاعظيم رزگاه, also Romanized as Mollā ‘Az̧īm Razgāh) is a village in Goli Jan Rural District, in the Central District of Tonekabon County, Mazandaran Province, Iran. At the 2006 census, its population was 159, in 51 families.
