= Faqih Mahalleh =

Faqih Mahalleh فقیه‌محله
- village
- Location within Iran
- Coordinates: 36°49′12″N 50°48′22″E
- Country: Iran
- Province: Mazandaran
- County: Tonekabon
- Bakhsh: Central
- Rural District: Goli Jan

Population (2006)
  - Total: 240
- Time zone: UTC+3:30 (IRST)
  - Summer (DST): UTC+4:30 (IRDT)

Faqih Mahalleh (Persian: فقیه‌محله, also Romanized as Faqīh Maḩalleh) is a village in Goli Jan Rural District, in the Central District of Tonekabon County, Mazandaran Province, Iran. According to the 2006 census, the population was 240 people within 75 families.
