= Poschal =

Poschal پس چال
- Village
- Location within Iran
- Coordinates: 36°49′35″N 50°44′33″E
- Country: Iran
- Province: Mazandaran
- County: Tonekabon
- Bakhsh: Central
- Rural District: Goli Jan

Population (2006)
  - Total: 42
- Time zone: UTC+3:30 (IRST)
  - Summer (DST): UTC+4:30 (IRDT)

Poschal (Persian: پس چال, also Romanized as Poschāl) is a village in Goli Jan Rural District, in the Central District of Tonekabon County, Mazandaran Province, Iran. At the 2006 census, its population was 42, in 14 families.
