= Haleh Kaleh =

Haleh Kaleh هاله كله
- Village
- Location within Iran
- Coordinates: 36°49′39″N 50°47′27″E
- Country: Iran
- Province: Mazandaran
- County: Tonekabon
- Bakhsh: Central
- Rural District: Goli Jan

Population (2006)
  - Total: 208
- Time zone: UTC+3:30 (IRST)
  - Summer (DST): UTC+4:30 (IRDT)

Haleh Kaleh (Persian: هاله كله, also Romanized as Hāleh Kaleh and Hālehkaleh) is a village in Goli Jan Rural District, in the Central District of Tonekabon County, Mazandaran Province, Iran. At the 2006 census, its population was 208, in 62 families.
