= Molla Hajji Mahalleh =

Molla Hajji Mahalleh ملاحاجي محله
- Village
- Location within Iran
- Coordinates: 36°47′20″N 50°48′54″E
- Country: Iran
- Province: Mazandaran
- County: Tonekabon
- Bakhsh: Central
- Rural District: Goli Jan

Population (2006)
  - Total: 254
- Time zone: UTC+3:30 (IRST)
  - Summer (DST): UTC+4:30 (IRDT)

Molla Hajji Mahalleh (Persian: ملاحاجي محله, also Romanized as Mollā Ḩājjī Maḩalleh) is a village in Goli Jan Rural District, in the Central District of Tonekabon County, Mazandaran Province, Iran. At the 2006 census, its population was 254, in 79 families.
