= Mahajarabad =

Coordinates: 28°21′48″N 56°33′14″E

Mahajarabad مهاجر آباد
- Village
- Interactive map of Mahajarabad
- Country: Iran
- Province: Mazandaran
- County: Tonekabon
- Bakhsh: Central
- Rural District: Goli Jan

Population (2006)
  - Total: 15
- Time zone: UTC+3:30 (IRST)
  - Summer (DST): UTC+4:30 (IRDT)

Mahajarabad (Persian: مهاجر آباد, also Romanized as Mahājarābād) is a village in Goli Jan Rural District, in the Central District of Tonekabon County, Mazandaran Province, Iran. At the 2006 census, its population was 15, in 4 families.
