= Darvish Sara =

Darvish Sara درويش سرا
- Village
- Location within Iran
- Coordinates: 36°49′22″N 50°45′23″E
- Country: Iran
- Province: Mazandaran
- County: Tonekabon
- Bakhsh: Central
- Rural District: Goli Jan

Population (2006)
  - Total: 226
- Time zone: UTC+3:30 (IRST)
  - Summer (DST): UTC+4:30 (IRDT)

Darvish Sara (Persian: درويش سرا, also Romanized as Darvīsh Sarā and Darvīshsarā) is a village in Goli Jan Rural District, in the Central District of Tonekabon County, Mazandaran Province, Iran. At the 2006 census, its population was 226, in 79 families.
