= Siah Band =

Siah Band سياه بند
- Village
- Country: Iran
- Province: Mazandaran
- County: Tonekabon
- Bakhsh: Central
- Rural District: Goli Jan

Population (2006)
  - Total: 38
- Time zone: UTC+3:30 (IRST)
  - Summer (DST): UTC+4:30 (IRDT)

Siah Band (Persian: سياه بند, also Romanized as Sīāh Band) is a village in Goli Jan Rural District, in the Central District of Tonekabon County, Mazandaran Province, Iran. At the 2006 census, its population was 38, in 11 families.
