= Talu Sar Mahalleh =

Talu Sar Mahalleh تلوسرمحله
- Village
- Location within Iran
- Coordinates: 36°49′48″N 50°45′59″E
- Country: Iran
- Province: Mazandaran
- County: Tonekabon
- Bakhsh: Central
- Rural District: Goli Jan

Population (2006)
  - Total: 218
- Time zone: UTC+3:30 (IRST)
  - Summer (DST): UTC+4:30 (IRDT)

Talu Sar Mahalleh (Persian: تلوسرمحله, also Romanized as Talū Sar Maḩalleh; also known as Talosarmaḩalleh) is a village in Goli Jan Rural District, in the Central District of Tonekabon County, Mazandaran Province, Iran. At the 2006 census, its population was 218, in 56 families.
