= Dimarun =

Dimarun ديمرون
- Village
- Location within Iran
- Coordinates: 36°42′00″N 50°39′39″E
- Country: Iran
- Province: Mazandaran
- County: Tonekabon
- Bakhsh: Central
- Rural District: Goli Jan

Population (2006)
  - Total: 100
- Time zone: UTC+3:30 (IRST)
  - Summer (DST): UTC+4:30 (IRDT)

Dimarun (Persian: ديمرون, also Romanized as Dīmarūn; also known as Damrūn) is a village in Goli Jan Rural District, in the Central District of Tonekabon County, Mazandaran Province, Iran. At the 2006 census, its population was 100, in 29 families.
