= Gol Mohammad Langeh =

Gol Mohammad Langeh گل محمدلنگه
- Village
- Location within Iran
- Coordinates: 36°48′47″N 50°43′40″E
- Country: Iran
- Province: Mazandaran
- County: Tonekabon
- Bakhsh: Central
- Rural District: Goli Jan

Population (2006)
  - Total: 57
- Time zone: UTC+3:30 (IRST)
  - Summer (DST): UTC+4:30 (IRDT)

Gol Mohammad Langeh (Persian: گل محمدلنگه, also Romanized as Golmohammad Lengeh) is a village in Goli Jan Rural District, in the Central District of Tonekabon County, Mazandaran Province, Iran. At the 2006 census, its population was 57, in 16 families.
