= Valg Sar =

Valg Sar ولگ سر
- Village
- Location within Iran
- Coordinates: 36°43′52″N 50°39′22″E
- Country: Iran
- Province: Mazandaran
- County: Tonekabon
- Bakhsh: Central
- Rural District: Goli Jan

Population (2006)
  - Total: 32
- Time zone: UTC+3:30 (IRST)
  - Summer (DST): UTC+4:30 (IRDT)

Valg Sar (Persian: ولگ سر; also known as Valkeh Sar) is a village located in Goli Jan Rural District, in the Central District of Tonekabon County, Mazandaran Province, Iran. At the 2006 census, its population was 32, in 23 families.
