= Kaseh Gar Mahalleh =

Neighborhood in Mazandaran province, Iran

Kaseh Gar Mahalleh Persian: كاسه گرمحله
- Neighborhood
- Location within Iran
- Coordinates: 36°50′06″N 50°49′05″E
- Country: Iran
- Province: Mazandaran
- County: Tonekabon
- District: Central
- City: Shirud

Population (2006)
  - Total: 314
- Time zone: UTC+3:30 (IRST)

Kaseh Gar Mahalleh (Persian: كاسه گرمحله) (Note: Also romanized as Kāseh Gar Maḩalleh) is a neighborhood in the city of Shirud in the Central District of Tonekabon County, Mazandaran province, Iran.

== Demographics ==
=== Population ===
At the time of the 2006 census, Kaseh Gar Mahalleh's population was 314 in 80 households, when it was a village in Goli Jan Rural District. In 2008, the villages of Bala Shirud, Beramsar, Hemmatabad, Kaseh Gar Mahalleh, Khezr Konar, Kochanak, Lapa Sar, Lashtu, Mian Daj Mahalleh, Mohammadabad, Mojtame-ye Meskuni Farhangian, Pain Shirud, Ramj Mahalleh, Rashidiyeh, Shaghuz Kaleh, Sharifabad, Tamijanak, Vachak, and Zaruj Mahalleh were merged to form the city of Shirud.
