= Posht Jub =

Posht Jub پشت جوب
- Village
- Location within Iran
- Coordinates: 36°50′52″N 50°46′18″E
- Country: Iran
- Province: Mazandaran
- County: Tonekabon
- Bakhsh: Central
- Rural District: Goli Jan

Population (2006)
  - Total: 166
- Time zone: UTC+3:30 (IRST)
  - Summer (DST): UTC+4:30 (IRDT)

Posht Jub (Persian: پشت جوب, also Romanized as Posht Jūb; also known as Pusht-i-Ja) is a village in Goli Jan Rural District, in the Central District of Tonekabon County, Mazandaran Province, Iran. At the 2006 census, its population was 166, in 46 families.
