= Shir Rud =

Shir Rud or Shirrud or Shirud (Persian: شيرود) may refer to:

- Bala Shirud, a former village in Tonekabon County
- Pain Shirud, a former village in Tonekabon County
- Shirud, Iran, a city in Tonekabon County
