= Lat Konar =

Lat Konar لات‌کنار
- village
- Location within Iran
- Coordinates: 36°49′01″N 50°47′58″E
- Country: Iran
- Province: Mazandaran
- County: Tonekabon
- Bakhsh: Central
- Rural District: Goli Jan

Population (2016)
  - Total: 13
- Time zone: UTC+3:30 (IRST)

Lat Konar (Persian: لات‌کنار, also Romanized as Lāt Konār) is a village in Goli Jan Rural District, in the Central District of Tonekabon County, Mazandaran Province, Iran.

At the time of the 2006 National Census, the village's population was 25 in 7 households. The following census in 2011 counted 36 people in 13 households. The 2016 census measured a population of 13 people in 8 households.
