= Hajjiabad, Tonekabon =

Village in Mazandaran province, Iran

Hajjiabad Persian: حاجي آباد
- Village
- Location within Iran
- Coordinates: 36°47′38″N 50°54′35″E
- Country: Iran
- Province: Mazandaran
- County: Tonekabon
- District: Central
- Rural District: Mir Shams ol Din

Population (2016)
  - Total: 1,614
- Time zone: UTC+3:30 (IRST)

Hajjiabad (Persian: حاجي آباد) (Note: Also romanized as Ḩājjīābād; also known as Ḩājīmaḩalleh) is a village in Mir Shams ol Din Rural District of the Central District in Mazandaran province, Iran.

== Demographics ==
=== Population ===
At the time of the 2006 National Census, the village's population was 1,810 in 508 households. The following census in 2011 counted 1,836 people in 559 households. The 2016 census measured the population of the village as 1,614 people in 523 households.
