= Shahrak-e Eslamabad, Mazandaran =

Village in Mazandaran province, Iran

Shahrak-e Eslamabad Persian: شهرك اسلام اباد
- Village
- Location within Iran
- Coordinates: 36°47′35″N 50°55′21″E
- Country: Iran
- Province: Mazandaran
- County: Tonekabon
- District: Central
- Rural District: Mir Shams ol Din

Population (2016)
  - Total: 769
- Time zone: UTC+3:30 (IRST)

Shahrak-e Eslamabad (Persian: شهرك اسلام اباد) (Note: Also romanized as Shahrak-e Eslāmābād; also known as Eslāmābād) is a village in Mir Shams ol Din Rural District of the Central District in Mazandaran province, Iran.

== Demographics ==
=== Population ===
At the time of the 2006 National Census, the village's population was 1,023 in 311 households. The following census in 2011 counted 814 people in 261 households. The 2016 census measured the population of the village as 769 people in 256 households.
