= Bagh-e Nazar =

Village in Mazandaran province, Iran

Bagh-e Nazar Persian: باغ نظر
- Village
- Location within Iran
- Coordinates: 36°46′35″N 50°57′04″E
- Country: Iran
- Province: Mazandaran
- County: Tonekabon
- District: Central
- Rural District: Mir Shams ol Din

Population (2016)
  - Total: 459
- Time zone: UTC+3:30 (IRST)

Bagh-e Nazar (Persian: باغ نظر) (Note: Also romanized as Bāgh-e Naẓar and Bāghnaẓar) is a village in Mir Shams ol Din Rural District of the Central District in Mazandaran province, Iran.

== Demographics ==
=== Population ===
At the time of the 2006 National Census, the village's population was 256 in 69 households. The following census in 2011 counted 508 people in 151 households. The 2016 census measured the population of the village as 459 people in 155 households.
