= Ahun (disambiguation) =

Ahun a commune in the Creuse department in the Nouvelle-Aquitaine region in central France.

Ahun may also refer to:

- Ahun, Iran
- Canton of Ahun, France
- Johannes Ahun, Estonian windsurfer
- Rein Ahun, Estonian athletics coach
- Ahun a "non-space" used for interstellar travel in Ceux de nulle part

== See also ==
- Akhun (disambiguation)
