= Lazarbon =

Village in Mazandaran province, Iran

Lazarbon Persian: لزربن
- Village
- Location within Iran
- Coordinates: 36°49′59″N 50°47′01″E
- Country: Iran
- Province: Mazandaran
- County: Tonekabon
- District: Central
- Rural District: Goli Jan

Population (2016)
  - Total: 876
- Time zone: UTC+3:30 (IRST)

Lazarbon (Persian: لزربن) is a village in Goli Jan Rural District of the Central District in Tonekabon County, Mazandaran province, Iran.

== Demographics ==
=== Population ===
At the time of the 2006 National Census, the village's population was 744 in 211 households. The following census in 2011 counted 849 people in 255 households. The 2016 census measured the population of the village as 876 people in 296 households.
