= Ammariyeh =

Village in Mazandaran province, Iran

Ammariyeh Persian: عماريه
- Village
- Location within Iran
- Coordinates: 36°47′58″N 50°50′16″E
- Country: Iran
- Province: Mazandaran
- County: Tonekabon
- District: Central
- Rural District: Goli Jan

Population (2016)
  - Total: 2,395
- Time zone: UTC+3:30 (IRST)

Ammariyeh (Persian: عماريه) (Note: Also romanized as ʿAmmārīyeh) is a village in Goli Jan Rural District of the Central District in Tonekabon County, Mazandaran province, Iran.

== Demographics ==
=== Population ===
At the time of the 2006 National Census, the village's population was 2,682 in 749 households. The following census in 2011 counted 2,483 people in 767 households. The 2016 census measured the population of the village as 2,395 people in 848 households, the most populous in its rural district.
