= Salimabad, Tonekabon =

Village in Mazandaran province, Iran

Salimabad Persian: سليم آباد
- Village
- Location within Iran
- Coordinates: 36°46′46″N 50°47′41″E
- Country: Iran
- Province: Mazandaran
- County: Tonekabon
- District: Central
- Rural District: Goli Jan

Population (2016)
  - Total: 749
- Time zone: UTC+3:30 (IRST)

Salimabad (Persian: سليم آباد) (Note: Also romanized as Salīmābād) is a village in Goli Jan Rural District of the Central District in Tonekabon County, Mazandaran province, Iran.

== Demographics ==
=== Population ===
At the time of the 2006 National Census, the village's population was 715 in 178 households. The following census in 2011 counted 673 people in 190 households. The 2016 census measured the population of the village as 749 people in 237 households.
