= Khalkhal Mahalleh-ye Jadid =

Khalkhal Mahalleh-ye Jadid خلخال محله جديد
- Village
- Location within Iran
- Coordinates: 36°48′47″N 50°49′49″E
- Country: Iran
- Province: Mazandaran
- County: Tonekabon
- Bakhsh: Central
- Rural District: Goli Jan

Population (2006)
  - Total: 324
- Time zone: UTC+3:30 (IRST)
  - Summer (DST): UTC+4:30 (IRDT)

Khalkhal Mahalleh-ye Jadid (Persian: خلخال محله جديد, also Romanized as Khalkhāl Maḩalleh-ye Jadīd; also known as Khalkhālī Maḩalleh and Khalkhāl Maḩalleh) is a village in Goli Jan Rural District, in the Central District of Tonekabon County, Mazandaran Province, Iran. At the 2006 census, its population was 324, in 97 families.
