= Khowban Razgah =

Village in Mazandaran province, Iran

Khowban Razgah Persian: خوبان رزگاه
- Village
- Location within Iran
- Coordinates: 36°48′45″N 50°51′08″E
- Country: Iran
- Province: Mazandaran
- County: Tonekabon
- District: Central
- Rural District: Goli Jan

Population (2016)
  - Total: 852
- Time zone: UTC+3:30 (IRST)

Khowban Razgah (Persian: خوبان رزگاه) (Note: Also romanized as Khowbān Razgāh) is a village in Goli Jan Rural District of the Central District in Tonekabon County, Mazandaran province, Iran.

== Demographics ==
=== Population ===
At the time of the 2006 National Census, the village's population was 706 in 197 households. The following census in 2011 counted 802 people in 253 households. The 2016 census measured the population of the village as 852 people in 271 households.
