= Chala Sar =

Village in Mazandaran province, Iran

Chala Sar Persian: چلاسر
- Village
- Location within Iran
- Coordinates: 36°48′11″N 50°47′22″E
- Country: Iran
- Province: Mazandaran
- County: Tonekabon
- District: Central
- Rural District: Goli Jan

Population (2016)
  - Total: 642
- Time zone: UTC+3:30 (IRST)

Chala Sar (Persian: چلاسر) (Note: Also romanized as Chalā Sar and Chalāsar) is a village in Goli Jan Rural District of the Central District in Tonekabon County, Mazandaran province, Iran.

== Demographics ==
=== Population ===
At the time of the 2006 National Census, the village's population was 571 in 176 households. The following census in 2011 counted 625 people in 206 households. The 2016 census measured the population of the village as 642 people in 224 households.
