= Valiabad, Tonekabon =

Village in Mazandaran province, Iran

Valiabad Persian: ولي اباد
- Village
- Location within Iran
- Coordinates: 36°46′58″N 50°56′15″E
- Country: Iran
- Province: Mazandaran
- County: Tonekabon
- District: Central
- Rural District: Mir Shams ol Din

Population (2016)
  - Total: 3,548
- Time zone: UTC+3:30 (IRST)

Valiabad (Persian: ولي اباد) (Note: Also romanized as Valīābād) is a village in Mir Shams ol Din Rural District of the Central District in Mazandaran province, Iran.

== Demographics ==
=== Population ===
At the time of the 2006 National Census, the village's population was 3,012 in 888 households. The following census in 2011 counted 3,396 people in 930 households. The 2016 census measured the population of the village as 3,548 people in 1,095 households, the most populous in its rural district.
