= Bazar Mahalleh, Mazandaran =

Bazar Mahalleh بازارمحله
- Village
- Location within Iran
- Coordinates: 36°50′02″N 50°45′22″E
- Country: Iran
- Province: Mazandaran
- County: Tonekabon
- Bakhsh: Central
- Rural District: Goli Jan

Population (2006)
  - Total: 330
- Time zone: UTC+3:30 (IRST)
  - Summer (DST): UTC+4:30 (IRDT)

Bazar Mahalleh (Persian: بازارمحله, also Romanized as Bāzār Maḩalleh) is a village in Goli Jan Rural District, in the Central District of Tonekabon County, Mazandaran Province, Iran. At the 2006 census, its population was 330, in 104 families.
