= Khalkhal Mahalleh-ye Qadim =

Khalkhal Mahalleh-ye Qadim خلخال‌محله قديم
- village
- Location within Iran
- Coordinates: 36°49′01″N 50°49′24″E
- Country: Iran
- Province: Mazandaran
- County: Tonekabon
- Bakhsh: Central
- Rural District: Goli Jan

Population (2006)
  - Total: 126
- Time zone: UTC+3:30 (IRST)
  - Summer (DST): UTC+4:30 (IRDT)

Khalkhal Mahalleh-ye Qadim (Persian: خلخال‌محله قديم, also Romanized as Khalkhāl Maḩalleh-ye Qadīm; also known as Khalkhālī Maḩalleh-ye Qadīm) is a village in Goli Jan Rural District, in the Central District of Tonekabon County, Mazandaran Province, Iran. At the 2006 census, its population was 126, in 36 families.
