= Shiraj Mahalleh-ye Kuchak =

Village in Mazandaran province, Iran

Shiraj Mahalleh-ye Kuchak Persian: شيرج محله كوچك
- Village
- Location within Iran
- Coordinates: 36°46′46″N 50°51′14″E
- Country: Iran
- Province: Mazandaran
- County: Tonekabon
- District: Central
- Rural District: Mir Shams ol Din

Population (2016)
  - Total: 100
- Time zone: UTC+3:30 (IRST)

Shiraj Mahalleh-ye Kuchak (Persian: شيرج محله كوچك) (Note: Also romanized as Shīraj Maḩalleh-ye Kūchak) is a village in Mir Shams ol Din Rural District of the Central District in Mazandaran province, Iran.

== Demographics ==
=== Population ===
At the time of the 2006 National Census, the village's population was 58 in 19 households. The following census in 2011 counted 85 people in 28 households. The 2016 census measured the population of the village as 100 people in 37 households.
