= Bazar Mahalleh =

Bazar Mahalleh (Persian: بازارمحله) may refer to:

- Bazar Mahalleh, Gilan
- Bazar Mahalleh, Mazandaran
