= Khalkhal Mahalleh =

Khalkhal Mahalleh (Persian: خلخال محله), also rendered as Khalkhali Mahalleh, may refer to:

- Khalkhal Mahalleh-ye Jadid
- Khalkhal Mahalleh-ye Qadim
