= Chenarbon, Tonekabon =

Village in Mazandaran province, Iran

Chenarbon Persian: چناربن
- Village
- Location within Iran
- Coordinates: 36°48′52″N 50°50′38″E
- Country: Iran
- Province: Mazandaran
- County: Tonekabon
- District: Central
- Rural District: Goli Jan

Population (2016)
  - Total: 1,154
- Time zone: UTC+3:30 (IRST)

Chenarbon (Persian: چناربن) (Note: Also romanized as Chenārbon) is a village in Goli Jan Rural District of the Central District in Tonekabon County, Mazandaran province, Iran.

== Demographics ==
=== Population ===
At the time of the 2006 National Census, the village's population was 940 in 274 households. The following census in 2011 counted 1,138 people in 375 households. The 2016 census measured the population of the village as 1,154 people in 375 households.
