= Nasirabad, Tonekabon =

Village in Mazandaran province, Iran

Nasirabad Persian: نصيراباد
- Village
- Location within Iran
- Coordinates: 36°49′32″N 50°49′52″E
- Country: Iran
- Province: Mazandaran
- County: Tonekabon
- District: Central
- Rural District: Goli Jan

Population (2016)
  - Total: 660
- Time zone: UTC+3:30 (IRST)

Nasirabad (Persian: نصيراباد) (Note: Also romanized as Naşīrābād) is a village in Goli Jan Rural District of the Central District in Tonekabon County, Mazandaran province, Iran.

== Demographics ==
=== Population ===
At the time of the 2006 National Census, the village's population was 952 in 266 households. The following census in 2011 counted 1,005 people in 312 households. The 2016 census measured the population of the village as 660 people in 246 households.
