= Aminabad, Tonekabon =

Village in Mazandaran province, Iran

Aminabad Persian: امين اباد
- Village
- Location within Iran
- Coordinates: 36°45′43″N 50°56′41″E
- Country: Iran
- Province: Mazandaran
- County: Tonekabon
- District: Central
- Rural District: Mir Shams ol Din

Population (2016)
  - Total: 409
- Time zone: UTC+3:30 (IRST)

Aminabad (Persian: امين اباد) (Note: Also romanized as Amīnābād) is a village in Mir Shams ol Din Rural District of the Central District in Mazandaran province, Iran.

== Demographics ==
=== Population ===
At the time of the 2006 National Census, the village's population was 363 in 103 households. The following census in 2011 counted 366 people in 123 households. The 2016 census measured the population of the village as 409 people in 136 households.
