= Mir Shams ol Din =

Village in Mazandaran province, Iran

Mir Shams ol Din Persian: میرشمس‌الدین
- Village
- Location within Iran
- Coordinates: 36°46′41″N 50°56′14″E
- Country: Iran
- Province: Mazandaran
- County: Tonekabon
- District: Central
- Rural District: Mir Shams ol Din

Population (2016)
  - Total: 1,436
- Time zone: UTC+3:30 (IRST)

Mir Shams ol Din (Persian: میرشمس‌الدین) (Note: Also romanized as Mīr Shams ol Dīn; also known as Mīr Shams od Dīn) is a village in, and the capital of, Mir Shams ol Din Rural District in the Central District of Mazandaran province, Iran.

== Demographics ==
=== Population ===
At the time of the 2006 National Census, the village's population was 1,386 in 400 households. The following census in 2011 counted 1,453 people in 485 households. The 2016 census measured the population of the village as 1,436 people in 510 households.
