= Kalijar =

Kalijar (Persian: كليجار) may refer to:

- Kalijar, Gilan
- Kalijar, Mazandaran
