= Ab Kuleh Sar-e Kuchak =

Village in Mazandaran province, Iran

Ab Kuleh Sar-e Kuchak Persian: ابكوله سركوچك
- Village
- Location within Iran
- Coordinates: 36°47′11″N 50°54′23″E
- Country: Iran
- Province: Mazandaran
- County: Tonekabon
- District: Central
- Rural District: Mir Shams ol Din

Population (2016)
  - Total: 401
- Time zone: UTC+3:30 (IRST)

Ab Kuleh Sar-e Kuchak (Persian: آبكوله سر كوچک) (Note: Also romanized as Āb Kūleh Sar-e Kūchak; also known as Āb Kalleh Sar-e Kūchak) is a village in Mir Shams ol Din Rural District of the Central District in Mazandaran province, Iran.

== Demographics ==
=== Population ===
At the time of the 2006 National Census, the village's population was 362 in 104 households. The following census in 2011 counted 380 people in 114 households. The 2016 census measured the population of the village as 401 people in 137 households.
