= Soleymanabad, Mazandaran =

Village in Mazandaran province, Iran

Soleymanabad Persian: سلیمان آباد
- Village
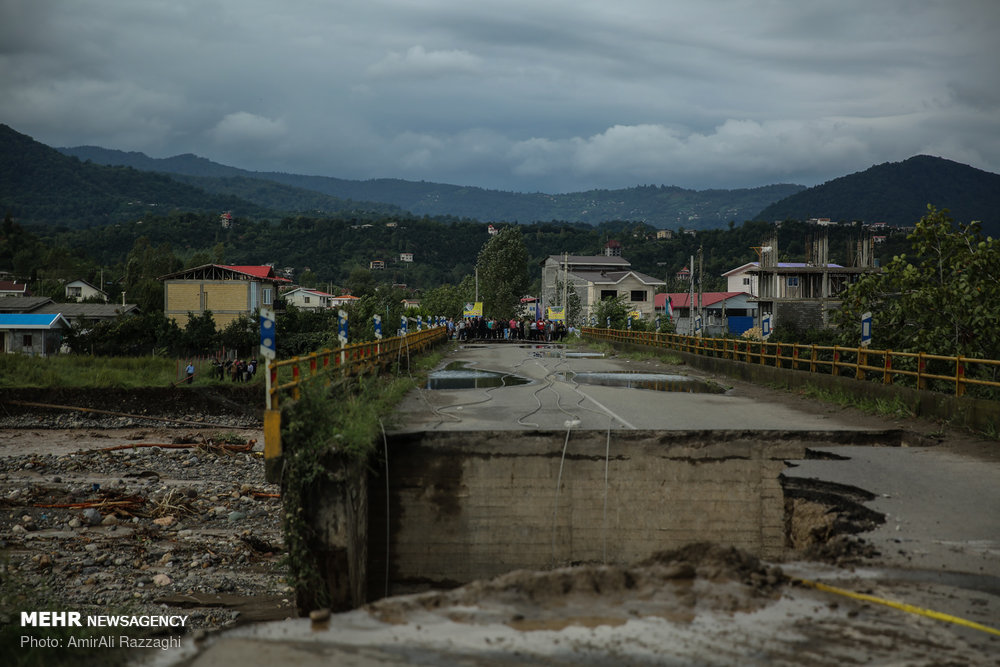
- Road destroyed after heavy rain in the village of Soleymanabad

- Location within Iran
- Coordinates: 36°48′01″N 50°48′14″E
- Country: Iran
- Province: Mazandaran
- County: Tonekabon
- District: Central
- Rural District: Goli Jan

Population (2016)
  - Total: 2,122
- Time zone: UTC+3:30 (IRST)

Soleymanabad (Persian: سليمان اباد) (Note: Also romanized as Soleymānābād) is a village in, and the capital of, Goli Jan Rural District in the Central District of Tonekabon County, Mazandaran province, Iran.

== Demographics ==
=== Population ===
At the time of the 2006 National Census, the village's population was 1,696 in 466 households. The following census in 2011 counted 1,937 people in 593 households. The 2016 census measured the population of the village as 2,122 people in 706 households.
