= Kashku, Mazandaran =

Village in Mazandaran province, Iran

Kashku Persian: كشكو
- Village
- Location within Iran
- Coordinates: 36°46′24″N 50°49′14″E
- Country: Iran
- Province: Mazandaran
- County: Tonekabon
- District: Central
- Rural District: Goli Jan

Population (2016)
  - Total: 812
- Time zone: UTC+3:30 (IRST)

Kashku (Persian: كشكو) (Note: Also romanized as Kashkū) is a village in Goli Jan Rural District of the Central District in Tonekabon County, Mazandaran province, Iran.

== Demographics ==
=== Population ===
At the time of the 2006 National Census, the village's population was 906 in 259 households. The following census in 2011 counted 877 people in 291 households. The 2016 census measured the population of the village as 812 people in 283 households.
