= Goli Jan, Mazandaran =

Village in Mazandaran province, Iran

Goli Jan Persian: گليجان
- Village
- Location within Iran
- Coordinates: 36°48′23″N 50°49′23″E
- Country: Iran
- Province: Mazandaran
- County: Tonekabon
- District: Central
- Rural District: Goli Jan

Population (2016)
  - Total: 699
- Time zone: UTC+3:30 (IRST)

Goli Jan (Persian: گليجان) (Note: Also romanized as Golī Jān; also known as Kalījār) is a village in Goli Jan Rural District of the Central District in Tonekabon County, Mazandaran province, Iran.

== Demographics ==
=== Population ===
At the time of the 2006 National Census, the village's population was 406 in 119 households. The following census in 2011 counted 443 people in 138 households. The 2016 census measured the population of the village as 699 people in 240 households.
