= Akhunov =

Akhunov / Ahunov, feminine: Akhunova / Ahunova is a patronymic surname derived from the Persian name or title ахун, akhund with the Russian Slavic patronymic suffix '-ov'. Notebla people with the surname include:

- Rustem Akhunov
- Tursunoy Akhunova
- Vyacheslav Akhunov
