= Akhund Mahalleh =

Akhund Mahalleh (Persian: اخوندمحله) may refer to:

- Akhund Mahalleh, Ardabil
- Akhund Mahalleh, Gilan
- Akhund Mahalleh, Mazandaran
