= Kashku =

Kashku or Koshku (Persian: كشكو) may refer to:

- Koshku, Fars
- Kashku, Hormozgan
- Kashku, Mazandaran
