= Akhund Mahalleh, Mazandaran =

Village in Mazandaran province, Iran

Akhund Mahalleh Persian: آخوند‌محله
- Village
- Location within Iran
- Coordinates: 36°47′08″N 50°48′25″E
- Country: Iran
- Province: Mazandaran
- County: Tonekabon
- District: Central
- Rural District: Goli Jan

Population (2016)
  - Total: 863
- Time zone: UTC+3:30 (IRST)

Akhund Mahalleh (Persian: آخوند‌محله) (Note: Also romanized as Akhūnd Maḩalleh) is a village in Goli Jan Rural District of the Central District in Tonekabon County, Mazandaran province, Iran.

== Demographics ==
=== Population ===
At the time of the 2006 National Census, the village's population was 873 in 230 households. The following census in 2011 counted 979 people in 301 households. The 2016 census measured the population of the village as 863 people in 306 households.
