= François Bordes =

French scientist and writer

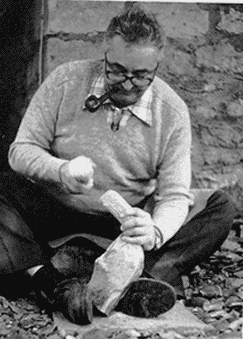
François Bordes

François Bordes (French pronunciation: [fʁɑ̃swa bɔʁd]; December 30, 1919 – April 30, 1981), also known by the pen name of Francis Carsac, was a French scientist, geologist, archaeologist, and science fiction writer.

== Biography ==
He was a professor of prehistory and quaternary geology at the Faculty of Sciences, University of Bordeaux 1. He decisively renewed the approach to focusing on prehistoric lithic industries, introducing statistical studies in typology and expanding the use of experimental flint knapping. He was internationally known among archaeologists for his ability to replicate ancient stone implements; his technique was showcased in a photo essay in the "Early Man" volume of the Life Nature Library.

He also published many science fiction novels under his pen name. In the USSR the science fiction of Carsac was very popular. He was translated and published into Russian as well as Romanian, Bulgarian, Lithuanian, Latvian, Hungarian, Estonian, Portuguese, amongst others. However, no translations into English existed until 2020, when Pour patrie l’espace was published as The City Among the Stars.

== Bibliography ==
=== Prehistory ===
- "Principes d'une méthode d'étude des techniques de débitage et de la typologie du Paléolithique ancien et moyen", L'Anthropologie, t. 54 (1950)
- A Tale of two Caves, Harper and Row (1972)
- Typologie du Paléolithique ancien et moyen, Delmas, Publications de l'Institut de Préhistoire de l'Université de Bordeaux, Mémoire n° 1 (1961), réédition CNRS 1988 : ISBN 2-87682-005-6
- Leçons sur le Paléolithique, CNRS, 3 vol. (1984)

=== Science fiction ===
==== Novels ====
- Ceux de nulle part (Those of Nowhere) (1954)
  - Doctor Vsevolod Clair helps out an alien in a flying saucer, joins him in an interstellar travel via ahun (non-space), and joins the struggle against invaders called misliks, who prefer to live near the absolute zero because their metabolism is based on superconductivity, and therefore they are extinguishing the stars in the star systems they colonize.
- Les Robinsons du Cosmos (The Robinsons of the Cosmos) (1955)
  - A piece of French land is ripped off from the Earth during a galactic collision and planted on an alien planet.
- Terre en fuite (Fleeing Earth) (1960)
- Pour patrie l’espace (literally "For Homeland Space", translated under the title The City Among the Stars in 2020) (1962)
  - The first English translation of Carsac's novels. Lieutenant in the Stellar Guard of Earth Empire is rescued by the "People of the Stars" who are born and live in space with minimal contact with planets.
- Ce monde est nôtre (This World is Ours) (1962)
- La Vermine du Lion (The Lion's Parasites) (1967)
  - A geologist Teraï Laprade struggles against a mining company from Earth whose activities on the planet Eldorado are detrimental for the indigenous population
- Sur un monde stérile (On a Barren World) (1997; written in 1945)

==== Shorter works ====
- "Hachures" (Hatch) (1954)
- "Taches de rouille" (Spots of Rust) (1954)
- "Genèse" (Genesis) (1958)
- "L’Homme qui parlait aux martiens" (The Man Who Spoke With Martians) (1958)
- "Le Baiser de la vie" (The Kiss of Life) (1959)
- "Sables morts" (Dead Sands) (1959)
- "La Revanche des Martiens" (The Revenge of the Martians) (1959)
- "Quelle aubaine pour un anthropologue!" (What a Boon for an Anthropologist!) (1959)
- "Les pauvres gens" (The Poor Folk) (1959)
- "La Voix du loup" (The Voice of the Wolf) (1960)
- "Premier Empire" (First Empire) (1960)
- "Une fenêtre sur le passé" (A Window on the Past) (1961)
- "L’Ancêtre" (The Ancestor) (1962)
- Les Monts De Destin (1966), also "Dans les montagnes du destin" (In the Mountains of Destiny) (1971)
  - A prequel to La Vermine du Lion
- "Le dieu qui vient avec le vent" (The God That Comes With the Wind) (1972)
- "Tant on s’ennuie en Utopie" (As You Get Bored in Utopia) (1975)
- "L’homme qui voulut être Dieu" (The Man Who Would be God) (1970)
- "Les Mains propres" (Clean Hands) (1981)
  - The third story involving Teraï Laprade, a "sidequel" to La Vermine du Lion
- "Celui qui vint de la grande eau" (One Who Came From the High Water) (1982)

==== Translations ====
- "Souvenir lointain" (Distant Memory) (1958) (translation of Poul Anderson's "The Long Remembering", 1957)

== See also ==
- Station François Bordes on the Bordeaux tramway
