= Tonekabon =

City in Mazandaran province, Iran

Tonekabon Gilaki: تؤنكابؤن
- City
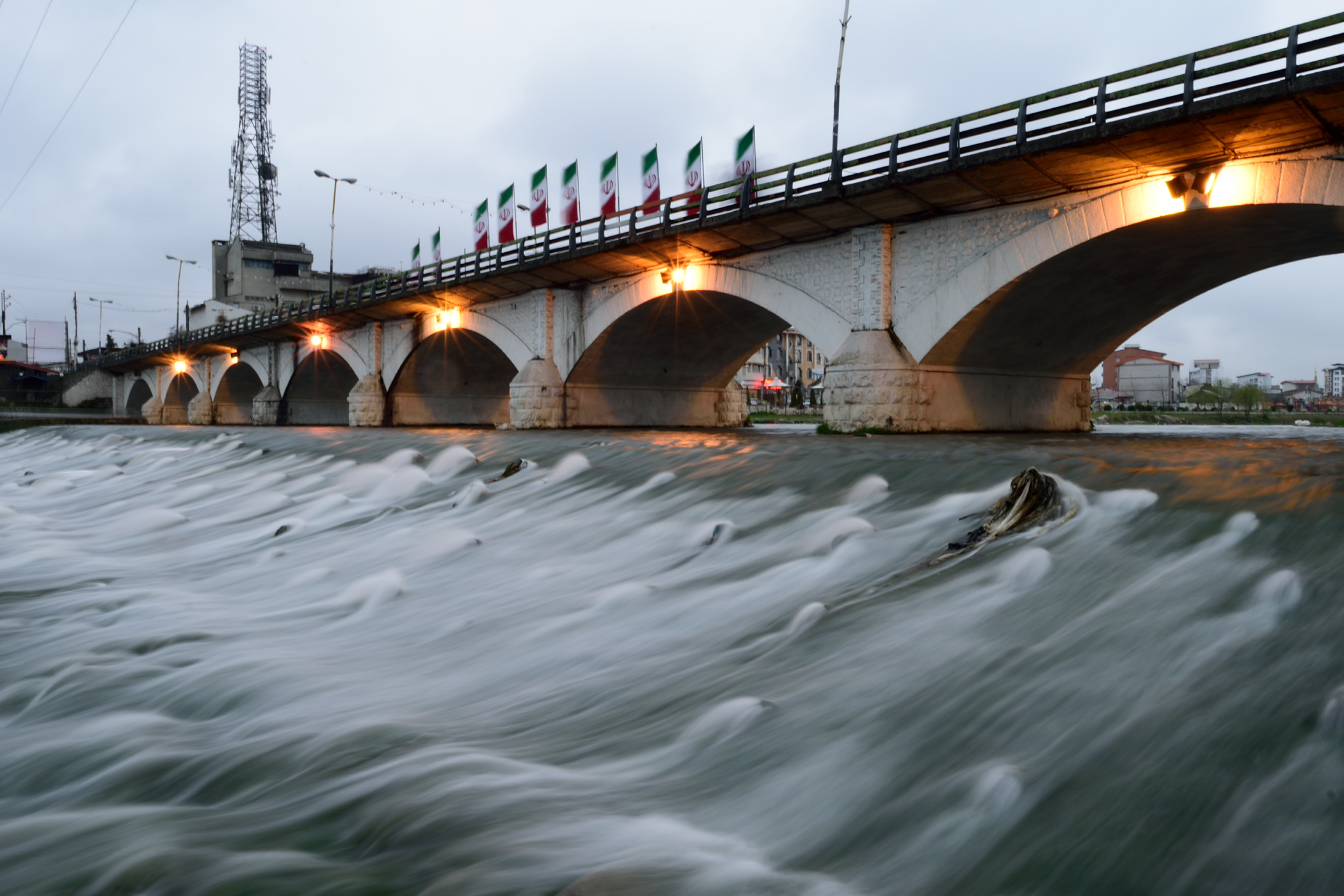
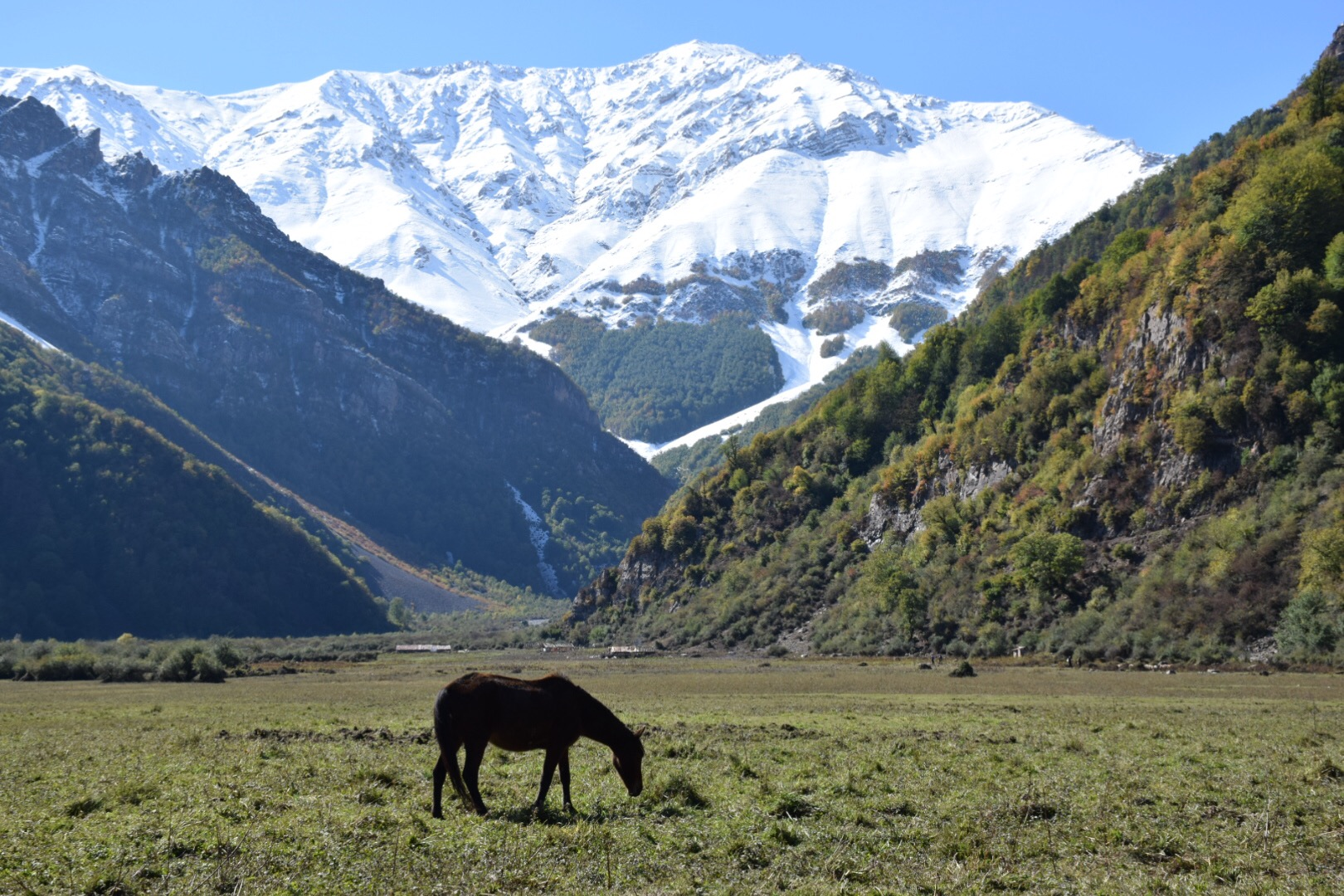
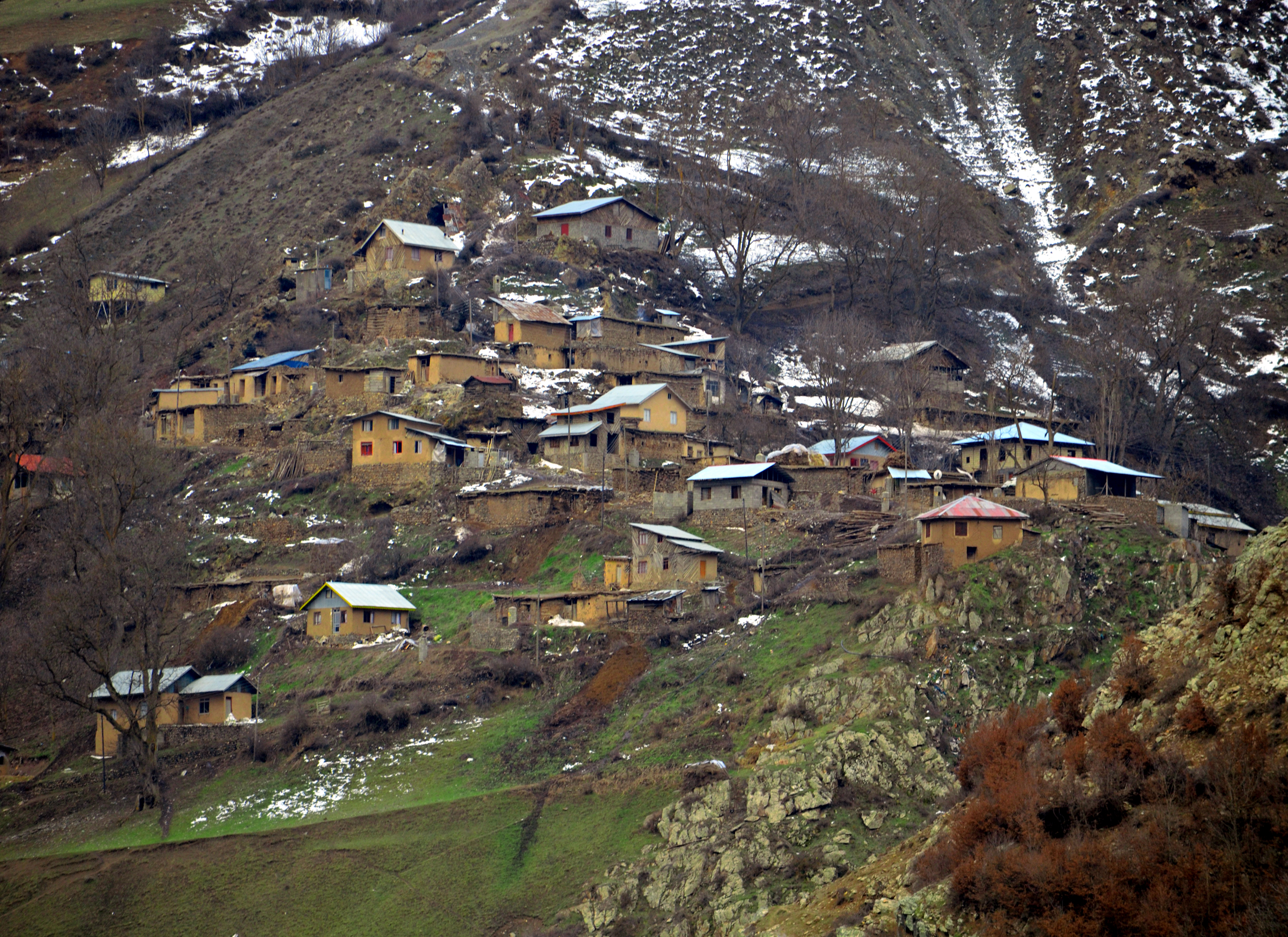
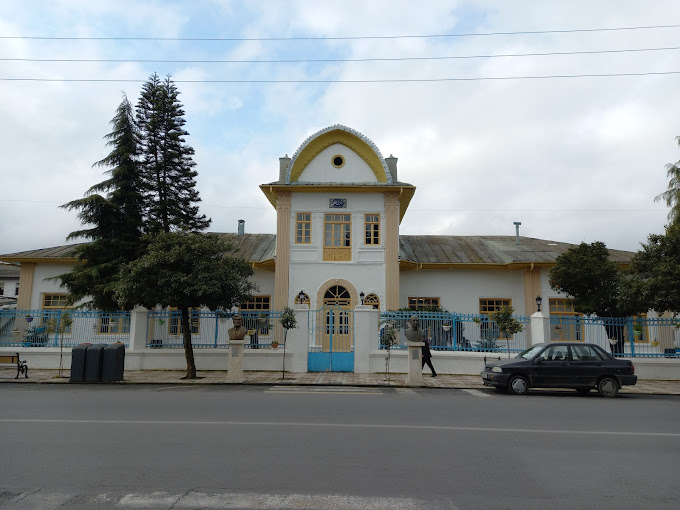
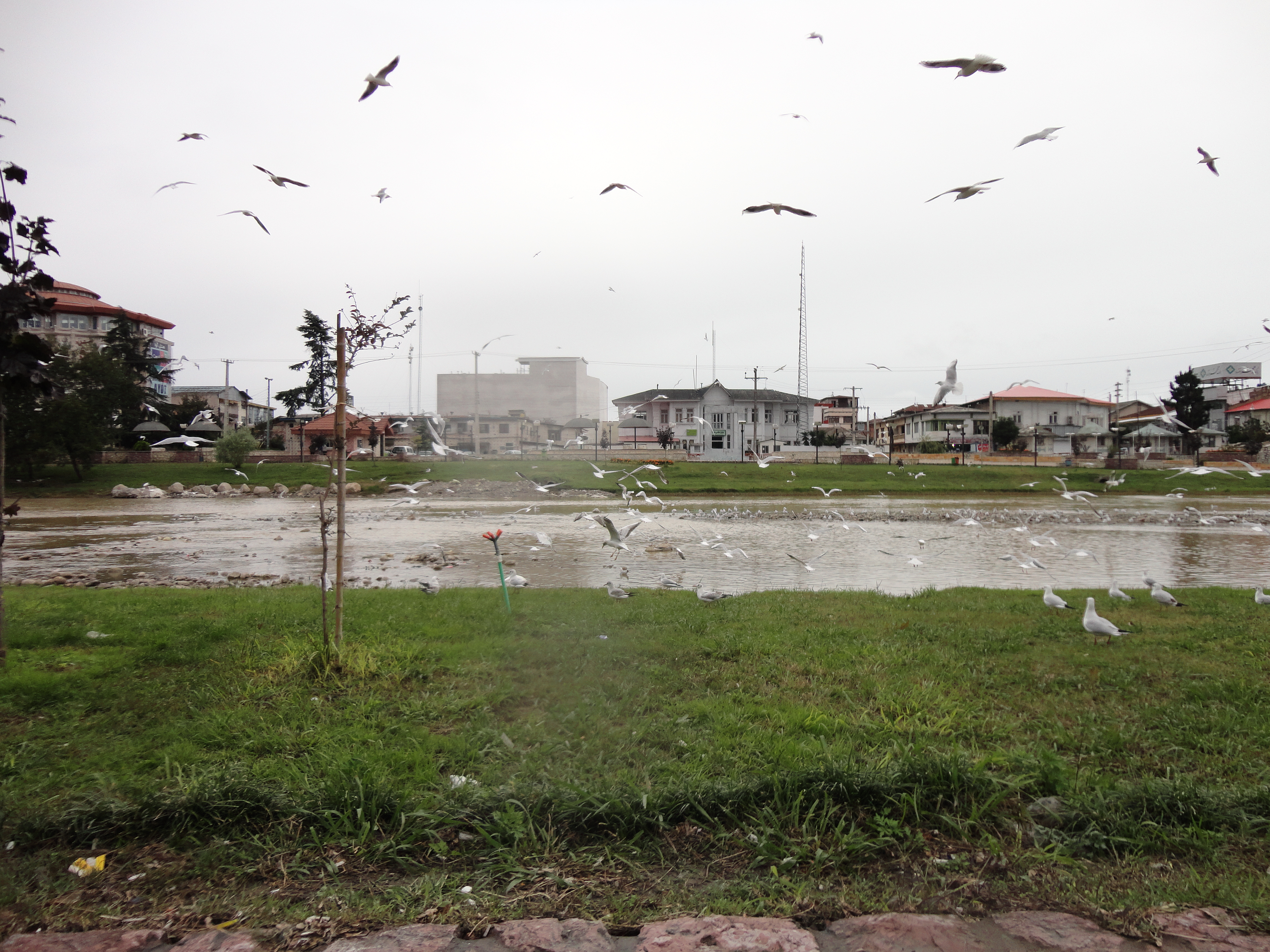

- Location within Iran
- Coordinates: 36°48′55″N 50°52′16″E
- Country: Iran
- Province: Mazandaran
- County: Tonekabon
- District: Central

Population (2016)
  - Total: 55,434
- Time zone: UTC+3:30 (IRST)
- Website: tonekabon.ir

Shahsavar/Tonekabon (Gilaki: تؤنکابؤن-شهسٚوار) (Note: Also romanized as Tonekābon; formerly known as Shahsavar (شَهسَوار), also romanized as Shahsavār and Shahsawār) is a city in the Central District of Tonekabon County, Mazandaran province, Iran, serving as capital of both its county and its district.

== Etymology ==
Toneka was a large and fortress-like city with a fence and a hard and strong surface in the west of Ruyan district. After the partial destruction of Shahsava/Toneka Castle due to its old age, a small city was turned into the main city of its area, built from the ruins of the old city, keeping its original names of Shahsavar/Tonekabon (Gilaki: شهسوآر/تنکآبن, lit. 'The city ruling over the Shah/Low point of the Toneka'). This name was extended to all the lands that formed the areas of the local rulers.

== History ==
The territory of Shahsavar/Tonekabon was originally part of Gilan & Daylamestan. Numerous evidences discovered in various parts of the region, indicate that it was a flourishing city in the past. The ancient Shahsavar/Tonekabon experienced the Padusbanan helding the power of it vicinity till the reign of Abbas the First.

During the Pahlavi era, the city was renamed to its original name of Shahsavar. After the 1979 Iranian revolution the name was returned to its second oldest name Tonekabon. Almost all of the present-day people of the city still use the Shahsavar name.

== Demographics ==
=== Language ===
The language of Tonekabon is 86% Gilaki, the rest is a mixture of other languages such as Mazani, Kurdi, Luri, & even Baluchi.

=== Population ===
At the time of the 2006 National Census, the city's population was 43,128 in 13,087 households. The following census in 2011 counted 45,338 people in 14,975 households. The 2016 census measured the population of the city as 55,434 people in 18,878 households.

== Geography ==
Shahsavar is located on the southern coast of the Caspian Sea, 257 kilometres (160 mi) north of Tehran, between Ramsar and Chalus. Tonekabon County has common borders with Qazvin province to the south.

In its northern regions it has a moderate and humid climate and in the southern portions cold weather prevails. The Cheshmeh Kileh River flows through it.

=== Climate ===
Tonekabon has a humid subtropical climate (Köppen: Cfa, Trewartha: Cf), with warm, humid summers and cool, damp winters.

Climate data for Tonekabon
Month	Jan	Feb	Mar	Apr	May	Jun	Jul	Aug	Sep	Oct	Nov	Dec	Year
Mean daily maximum °C (°F)	10.5 (50.9)	10.4 (50.7)	12.4 (54.3)	17.6 (63.7)	22.8 (73.0)	27.4 (81.3)	30.1 (86.2)	29.7 (85.5)	26.8 (80.2)	21.9 (71.4)	17.5 (63.5)	13.0 (55.4)	20.0 (68.0)
Mean daily minimum °C (°F)	2.8 (37.0)	3.3 (37.9)	5.8 (42.4)	10.1 (50.2)	15.0 (59.0)	19.2 (66.6)	21.8 (71.2)	21.6 (70.9)	19.0 (66.2)	14.2 (57.6)	9.4 (48.9)	5.0 (41.0)	12.3 (54.1)
Average rainfall mm (inches)	83 (3.3)	69 (2.7)	78 (3.1)	43 (1.7)	40 (1.6)	41 (1.6)	31 (1.2)	65 (2.6)	124 (4.9)	225 (8.9)	146 (5.7)	115 (4.5)	1,060 (41.8)
Average snowfall cm (inches)	1.6 (0.6)	11.1 (4.4)	2.4 (0.9)	0.0 (0.0)	0.0 (0.0)	0.0 (0.0)	0.0 (0.0)	0.0 (0.0)	0.0 (0.0)	0.0 (0.0)	1.1 (0.4)	0.0 (0.0)	16.2 (6.3)
Average rainy days	11	11	15	12	11	7	5	8	9	12	11	11	123
Average relative humidity (%)	82	81	82	79	77	73	71	74	76	79	81	82	78
Mean monthly sunshine hours	130.2	121.5	111.6	147	198.4	231	226.3	201.5	165	145.7	135	120.9	1,934.1
Mean daily sunshine hours	4.2	4.3	3.6	4.9	6.4	7.7	7.3	6.5	5.5	4.7	4.5	3.9	5.3
Average ultraviolet index	2	3	2	4	5	6	6	6	5	4	4	3	4
Source: weather2visit World weather online(Snow-UV)

== Economy ==
A famous variety of orange, Shahsavari Orange, is grown in the city and bears its former name. The other products of Shahsavar are kiwi fruit, rice, tea, coffee and more. Shahsavar has a semi tropical climate. The temperature is mild year round.

The "Gardan Qaleh high lands" and "Dohezar, Sehhezar, & Chaharhezar Valleies" are famous resort areas in the Alborz/Alburs) mountain range, South of Shahsavar. There are also dense forests in Dohezar, Sehezar, & Chaharhezar Road areas of Iran’s Great Alborz Mountain Range.

== Tourist attractions ==
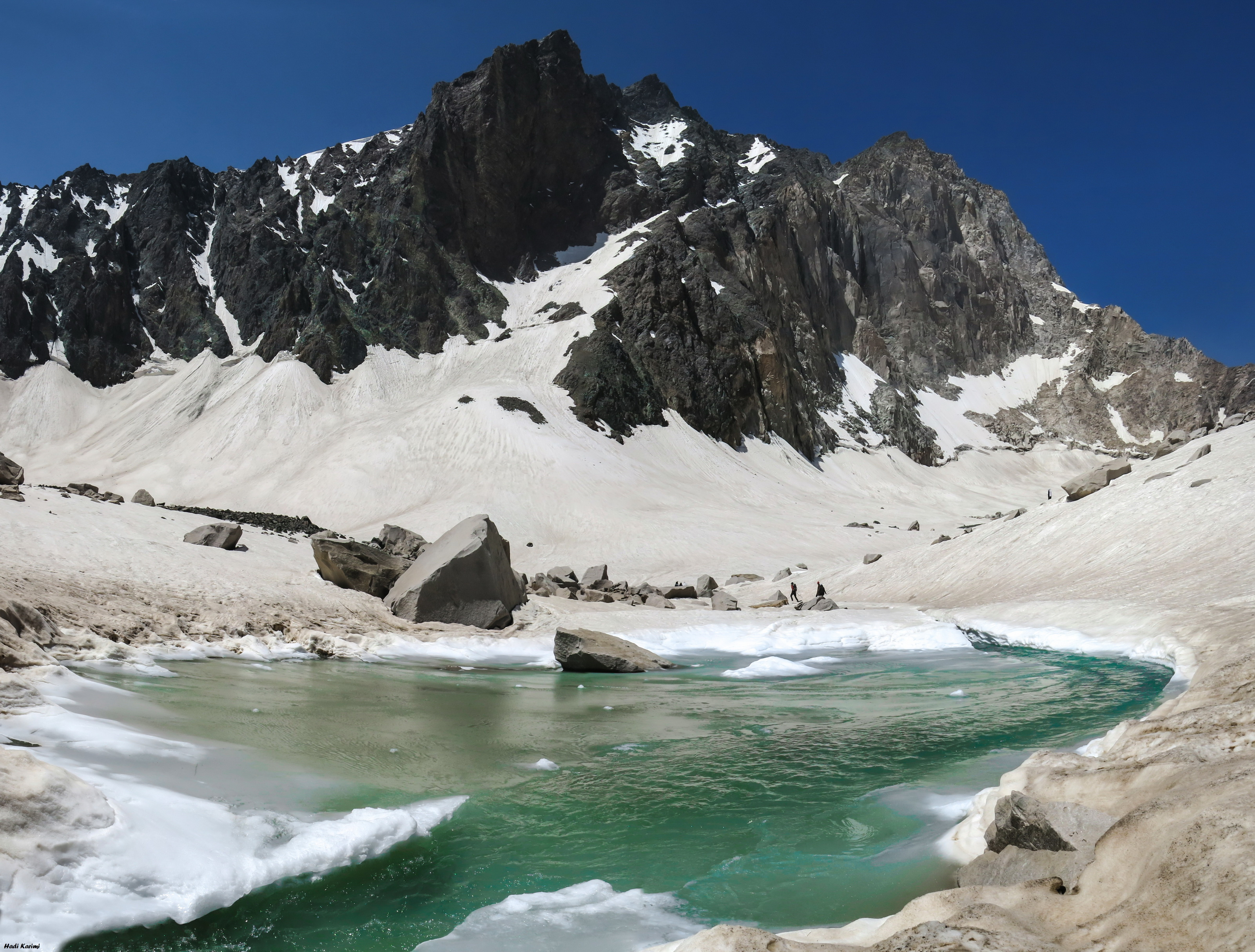
Glacial lake in Alam Kuh

• Alam Kuh

- Sialan
- Cheshmeh Kileh Bridges
- Wildlife Museum
- Municipality Palace of Shahsavar
- Do Hezar Forest Park
- Se Hezar Forest Park
- Toneka Castle
- Se Hezar Hot water
- Sang Bon Cheshmeh Waterfall
- Chaldarreh
- Daryasar Plain
- Dinar Sara
- Beles Kūh
- Kouhsar Waterfall
- Falakdeh Hot water
- Shahsavar Markets
- Garma Poshteh Village

== Notable people ==
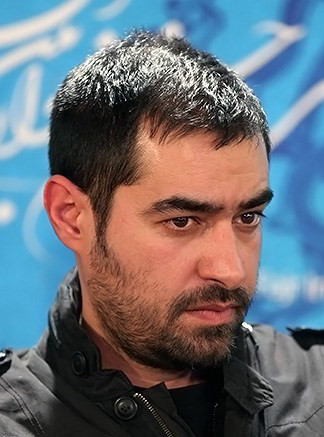
Shahab Hosseini

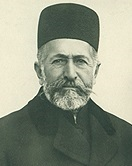
Sepahdar A'zam

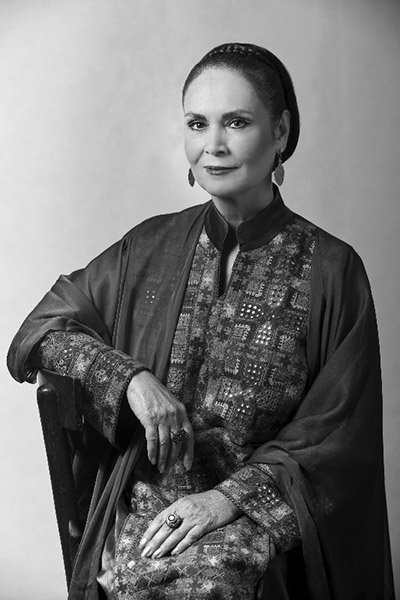
Parisa

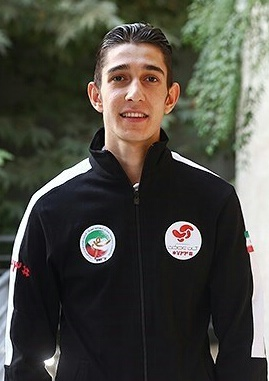
Farzan Ashourzadeh

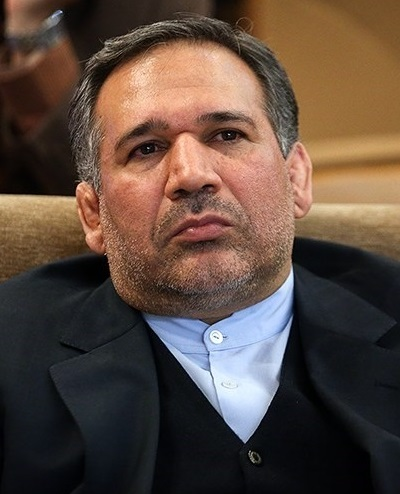
Shamseddin Hosseini

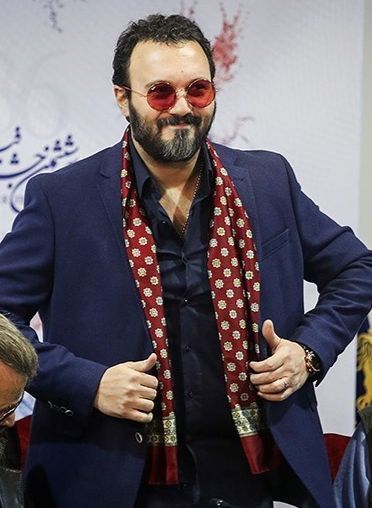
Kambiz Dirbaz

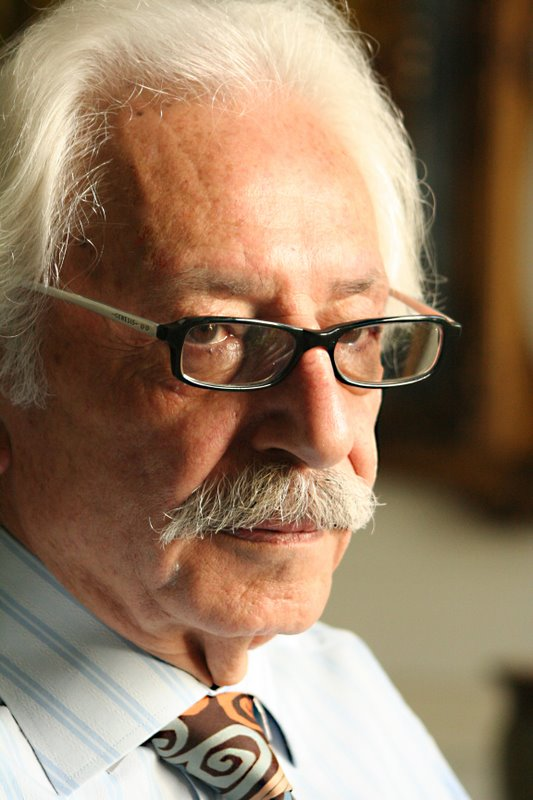
Jamshid Mashayekhi

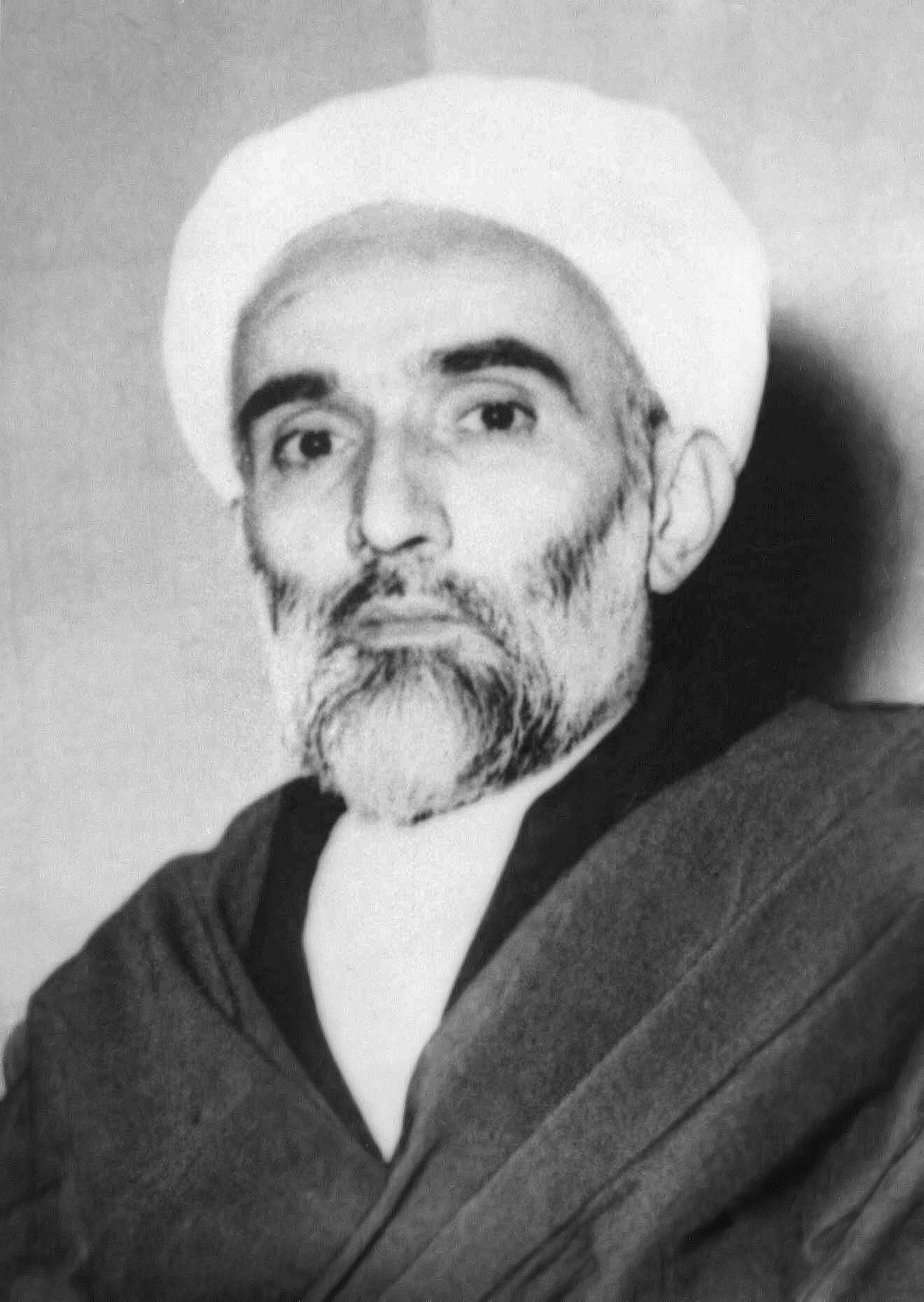
Mohammad Taghi Falsafi

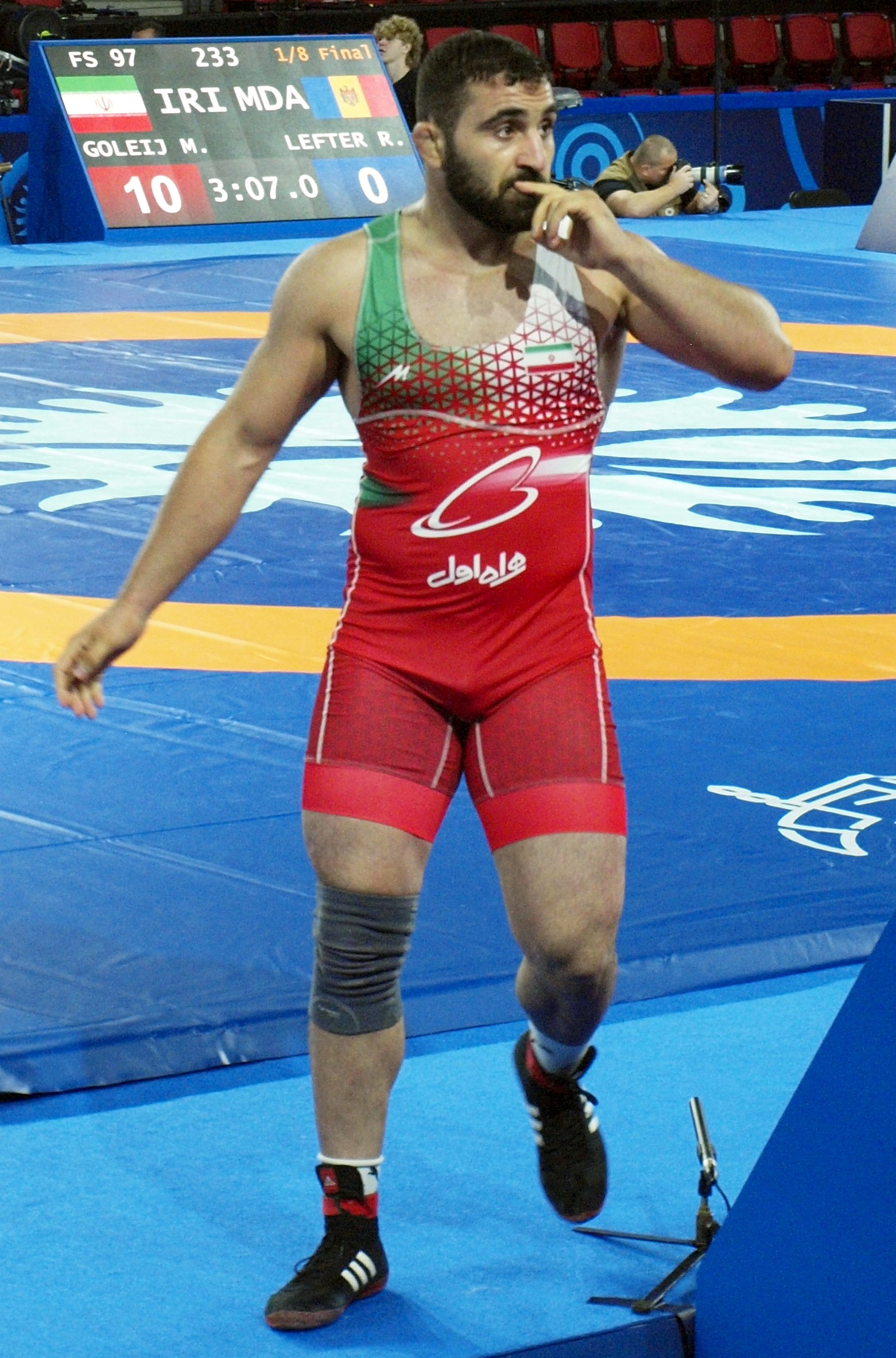
Mojtaba Goleij

- Mohammad Vali Khan Tonekaboni (1846–1926), former prime minister of Iran
- Shahab Hosseini (born 1974), actor
- Simin Ghanem (born 1944), singer
- Moslem Bahadori (born 1927), pathologist
- Shamseddin Hosseini (born 1967), politician
- Foad Manshadi (born 1987), musician
- Jamshid Mashayekhi (1934–2019), actor
- Bahram Aryana (1906–1985), general officer
- Ladan Mostofi (born 1972), actor
- Parisa (born 1950), singer
- Kambiz Dirbaz (born 1975), actor
- Arsalan Khalatbari (1904–1976) lawyer and politician
- Benyamin Bahadori (born 1982), musician, singer
- Kourosh Sotoodeh (born 1978), photographer
- Mohammad Taghi Falsafi (1908–1998), preacher
- Tunakabuni (17th-century), physician
- Mojtaba Goleij (born 1996), wrestler
- Mohammad Zohari (1926–1995), poet
- Farzan Ashourzadeh (born 1991), taekwondo practitioner
- Mehdi Khodabakhshi (born 1991), taekwondo practitioner
- Saeid Ahmadabbasi (born 1992), futsal player
- Javad Asghari Moghaddam (born 1979), futsal player
- Mohammad Mokhtari (born 1983), football player
- Navid Rezaeifar (born 1996), basketball player

== See also ==
- Populated coastal places in Iran
- Populated places on the Caspian Sea
