= La Vermine du Lion =

1967 novel by François Bordes

- cover of the first edition
- Author: Francis Carsac
- Cover artist: Gaston De Sainte-Croix
- Language: French
- Genre: Science fiction
- Publisher: Fleuve Noir
- Publication date: 1967
- Publication place: France
- Media type: Print (Paperback)
- Pages: 251 pp

La Vermine du Lion (The Lion's Parasites) is a science fiction novel by French writer Francis Carsac, first published in paperback by Fleuve Noir in 1967. It was reissued by Super-luxe in 1978 and Eons in 2004. The first hardcover edition was issued after the author's death by La page blanche in December 1982 with a new preface by Jacques Tixier.

The novel was dedicated to Carsac's American friends and science fiction writer colleagues Poul Anderson and L. Sprague de Camp, from whose works the author acknowledged borrowing some elements.

In 1966 Carsac published its prequel, a novelette Les Monts De Destin.

In 1981 Carsac published one more novelette involving Teraï Laprade, "Les Mains propres" (Clean Hands).

== Plot summary ==
The novel is an interplanetary adventure along the lines of de Camp's Krishna series. The protagonist, independent geologist Téraï Laprade, champions the native humanoids of the planet Eldorado against the Interplanetary Metallurgical Bureau (IMB), a predatory conglomerate bent on exterminating them so it can freely plunder their world's mineral wealth. Stella Henderson, daughter of the director of the IMB, arrives on El Dorado disguised as a reporter to gather information portraying the natives in an unfavorable light. She hires Laprade, who has connections among many of the planet's tribes, as her guide.

Their expedition involves them in conflicts with hostile inhabitants of Eldorado, and also in a religious war afflicting the largest state of Keno, where adherents of the bloodthirsty cult of the goddess Beelba seize power. In the course of this, Laprade begins to suspect Stella is not who she says she is, and his native wife Laele dies. Learning the war was provoked by the IMB, he destroys the priests and elevates a friend to the throne of the Keno empire.

After Stella's departure, her report achieves its goal, but she herself is isolated. Meanwhile, Laprade works to prevent the IMB from obtaining an unlimited license for the planet, which will empower it to develop any areas, regardless of the wishes of the inhabitants. He becomes a full-time agent for the Bureau of Xenology, a government agency opposing the IMB, and arms the natives from a large weapons shipment from the planet New England, transported to Eldorado with the help of Captain Flandry. Stella, having escaped custody of the IMB, informs Laprade of the conglomerate's monstrous plans to overthrow the government and exterminate of the Eldoradans. Laprade, at the head of the native army, takes the planet's spaceport, triggering a forty year quarantine of Eldorado that will protect the inhabitants. Stella dies in the conflict, and her realizes he loved her. He finds solace in Sigrid Nielsen, daughter of an old colleague, whom he marries.

== Reception ==
The novel was included in Annick Béguin's Les 100 principaux titres de la science-fiction in 1981.

L. Sprague de Camp called the book "a whale of a story," and with the permission of Carsac's widow undertook to translate it into English for the American market. His agent circulated a three-chapter sample with a synopsis of the remainder of the story to U.S. publishers, but it was rejected on the grounds that Carsac "had no name recognition in the US and, being dead, could not be sold as a 'coming' writer."

The novel was translated into Russian (printed 25 times, both standalone and in anthologies), Lithuanian, Polish, and Bulgarian.
