= Mir Shams ol Din Rural District =

Rural district in Mazandaran province, Iran

Mir Shams ol Din Rural District دهستان میرشمس‌الدین
- Rural District
- Location within Iran
- Coordinates: 36°47′N 50°55′E
- Country: Iran
- Province: Mazandaran
- County: Tonekabon
- District: Central
- Established: 2003
- Capital: Mir Shams ol Din

Population (2016)
  - Total: 8,736
- Time zone: UTC+3:30 (IRST)

Mir Shams ol Din Rural District (Persian: دهستان میرشمس‌الدین) is in the Central District of Tonekabon County, Mazandaran province, Iran. Its capital is the village of Mir Shams ol Din.

== Demographics ==
=== Population ===
At the time of the 2006 National Census, the rural district's population was 8,270 in 2,402 households. There were 8,838 inhabitants in 2,651 households at the following census of 2011. The 2016 census measured the population of the rural district as 8,736 in 2,849 households. The most populous of its eight villages was Valiabad, with 3,548 people.

=== Other villages in the rural district ===
- Ab Kuleh Sar-e Kuchak
- Aminabad
- Bagh-e Nazar
- Hajjiabad
- Shahrak-e Eslamabad, Mazandaran
- Shiraj Mahalleh-ye Kuchak
