= Mohammad Taghi Falsafi =

Mohammad Taghi Falsafi محمدتقی فلسفی
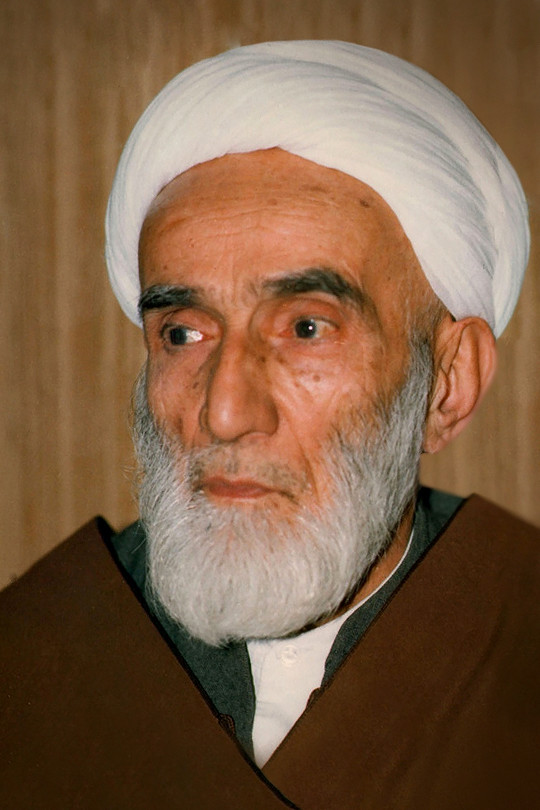
- Mohammad Taghi Falsafi, Iranian preacher
- Title: Ayatollah

Personal life
- Born: April 13, 1908 Tonekabon, Iran
- Died: December 19, 1998 (aged 90) Tehran, Iran

Religious life
- Religion: Shia Islam (Usuli Twelver)

Senior posting
- Period in office: Modern history

Mohammad Taghi Falsafi (Persian: محمدتقی فلسفی; 1908–1998) was an Iranian Ayatollah and preacher. He was a campaigner against the regime of Mohammad Reza Shah Pahlavi. Many of his lectures was about psychology, ethics and mental development. During the mid-1950s Falsafi strongly campaigned against the Baháʼí Faith, promoting conspiracies of a potential Baháʼí takeover and inciting an attack on a Baháʼí temple. His anti-Baháʼí speeches were broadcast on the radio during the month of Ramazan.

== Biography ==
Mohammad Taghi Falsafi was born in a religious family on April 11, 1908 in Tonekabon. His father, Mohammad Reza Tonekaboni was a teacher in Tehran hawza. Falsafi started to preach when he was 16 years old. He married his cousin.

== Death ==
He died on 18 December 1998. His grave is located in the Shah-Abdol-Azim shrine in Rey.

== Works ==
- Explanation of Makarem al-Akhlaq:

The first volume and the second volume was published by the Islamic Culture Publications Office in 1991 and 1992 respectively.

- Resurrection in view of spirit and material:

The book included series of Falsafi's lectures in Ramadan 1971. The book is three volumes that published by the Islamic Culture Publications Office.

- Young in view of rationality and sensibility:

This book included part of Falsafi's speeches. The book included the value of youth, elegance of youth, the opportunity of youth, respect for the young character, development of young personality, young and leisure.

- Child in view of heredity and upbringing
- Adults and young in view of thoughts and desires
- Morality in view of coexistence and human values
- Ayat-ul-Kursi heavenly messages of monotheism

== See also ==
- Persecution of Baháʼís
