= Akhun =

Akhun is a Uyghur surname. Notable people with the surname include:

- Islam Akhun, Uyghur con-man
- Omar Akhun, Uyghur composer and musician
- Sadri Akhun, Soviet sculptor
- Turdi Akhun (1881–1956), Uyghur folk musician

== See also ==
- Ahun (disambiguation)
