= Kourosh Sotoodeh =

Iranian fashion photographer

- Born: March 19, 1978 (age 47); Tonekabon, Mazandaran Province, Iran
- Occupation: Photographer
- Years active: 1998-present
- Known for: Fashion photography
- Website: www.kouroshsotoodeh.com

Kourosh Sotoodeh (born March 19, 1978) is an Iranian born fashion photographer based in New York City.

== Life and career ==
Sotoodeh was born in 1978 in Tonekabon, Iran. He holds a bachelor in Industrial Design from Azad Art University of Tehran. His interest in visual arts started at a young age and started working as a fashion and portrait photographer in 1998.

In addition to photography, Sotoodeh acted in few Iranian films including Cafe Setareh, which received a Crystal Simorgh nomination in the 24th Fajr International Film Festival. He started his acting career at the Amin Tarokh Film Acting School in 1998 and played in some theaters such as The Resistible Rise of Arturo Ui at City Theater of Tehran. He continued his training at the Karnameh Institute of Arts & Culture where he took acting class with Parviz Parastui and Habib Rezaei in 2005. In 2006, he was featured on the cover of 40cheragh magazine and his photographs were exhibited at Mahe Mehr Art & Cultural Institute in Tehran.

In 2009, Sotoodeh left Iran during the government crackdown and moved to the UAE. He worked as a professional fashion and advertising photographer in Dubai for a few modeling and advertising agencies before he settled in New York City in 2015.

Sotoodeh talked about leaving Iran and working in Dubai and NYC in an interview given to The Huffington Post, “The subjects in my photography are people, therefore it is natural for me to want to go somewhere where people have more freedom with their clothes, conduct, and social acts.” He worked with a number of top modeling agencies including IMG Models, Women Management, dna Model and The Lions as a fashion & beauty photographer in New York. His inspiration in fashion photography includes Irving Penn, Helmut Newton, Richard Avedon and Herb Ritts.

Sotoodeh worked with Joanne Gair at several shoots for the editorial of L'officiel and Lucire. In January 2017, he collaborated with Gair again and shot Iranian princess, Noor Pahlavi, daughter of Crown prince Reza Pahlavi, for the editorial of Marie Claire Indonesia. He also worked with noted Iranian photographer Firooz Zahedi for some projects.

=== Campaign ===
Sotoodeh has shot campaigns for Essie, Estée Lauder, Fair & Lovely, Kahlua, Blue Marlin Ibiza, Native, FashionTV, and Flydubai and his works were covered by various fashion channels including FashionTV and Fashion One. He has shot for a number of Persian celebrities including Mohsen Namjoo, and some Bollywood actors while he was in Dubai such as Saif Ali Khan and others.

=== Editorial ===
Sotoodeh's photographs are covered in various fashion magazines including Vogue, Harper's Bazaar, Elle, Glamour, Marie Claire, L'Officiel, MAXIM and others.
