= Shirud, Iran =

City in Mazandaran province, Iran

Shirud Persian: شیرود
- City
- Location within Iran
- Coordinates: 36°50′42″N 50°47′22″E
- Country: Iran
- Province: Mazandaran
- County: Tonekabon
- District: Central
- Established as a city: 2008

Population (2016)
  - Total: 11,377
- Time zone: UTC+3:30 (IRST)

Shirud (Persian: شیرود) is a city in the Central District of Tonekabon County, Mazandaran province, Iran.

== History ==
In 2008, the city of Shirud was established upon the merger of the following villages: Bala Shirud, Beramsar, Hemmatabad, Kaseh Gar Mahalleh, Khezr Konar, Kochanak, Lapa Sar, Lashtu, Mian Daj Mahalleh, Mohammadabad, Mojtame-ye Meskuni Farhangian, Pain Shirud, Ramj Mahalleh, Rashidiyeh, Shaghuz Kaleh, Sharifabad, Tamijanak, Vachak, and Zaruj Mahalleh.

== Demographics ==
=== Population ===
At the time of the 2011 National Census, the city's population was 10,429 people in 3,278 households. The 2016 census measured the population of the city as 11,377 people in 3,851 households.
