= Ceux de nulle part =

1954 science fiction novel by François Bordes

Ceux de nulle part (literally "Those from Nowhere") is a 1954 science fiction space opera novel written by French scientist François Bordes under the pen name Francis Carsac.

In 1962 Carsac published the sequel, Ce monde est nôtre ("This World is Ours").

== Plot ==
Doctor Vsévolod Clair helps out aliens in a flying saucer downed by the military of some Earth country. Aliens communicate telepathically and they suggest him to join their interstellar travel via ahun (non-space) to their native universe. They invite Clair to take part in the struggle against invaders called misliks. Misliks prefer to live near the absolute zero because their metabolism is based on superconductivity, and therefore they are extinguishing the stars in the star systems they colonize. Clair is the only one who can handle misliks thanks to the red blood of humans, unique in the universe: others are killed by some kind of radiation produced by misliks.

The novel is structured as a "story within a story within a story". It begins with the narration of Frank Borie, a colleague of doctor Clair. Clair tells him his story. In the epilogue Clair tells Borie that the aliens decided to call Earthlings for help and suggests Borie to join the team. The last paragraph of the epilogue says that this manuscript was found behind the sofa in Borie's apartment, who disappeared, last seen visited by a tall brunette man and a beautiful blonde woman.

== Commentary ==
A very similar plot was used in the book Aux Étoiles du Destin [To the Stars of Destiny] published six years later by Michel Jeury under the pen name Albert Higon in 1960.

== Translations ==
- Estonian: Tulnukad eikusagilt (1994, translated from Russian)
- Hungarian: A sehollakók (1980)
- Italian: Galassia maledetta ("Cursed Galaxy"), 1954, transl. Antonio Crimi, 1979, transl. Ugo Malaguti
- Latvian: Atnācēji no nekurienes (1969, translated from the French by Mirdza Ersa
- Lithuanian: Ateiviai Iš Niekur (1970, Vilnius, Vaga)
- Portuguese: A união dos universos (1957), Guerra de Estrelas (1961)
- Russian: Пришельцы ниоткуда ("Comers from Nowhere"), 1967, 1994, 2003
- Spanish: Los habitantes de la nada (1956)
