= Mal-e Akhund =

Mal-e Akhund مال اخوند
- Village
- Location within Iran
- Coordinates: 31°00′59″N 50°22′20″E
- Country: Iran
- Province: Kohgiluyeh and Boyer-Ahmad
- County: Landeh
- Bakhsh: Central
- Rural District: Tayebi-ye Garmsiri-ye Shomali

Population (2006)
  - Total: 55
- Time zone: UTC+3:30 (IRST)
  - Summer (DST): UTC+4:30 (IRDT)

Mal-e Akhund (Persian: مال اخوند, also Romanized as Māl-e Ākhūnd, Mal Akhoond, and Māl-e Ākhvond; also known as Māl-i-Akhūn) is a village in Tayebi-ye Garmsiri-ye Shomali Rural District, in the Central District of Landeh County, Kohgiluyeh and Boyer-Ahmad Province, Iran. At the 2006 census, its population was 55, in 11 families.
