= Akhundi =

Akhundi اخوندي
- village
- Location within Iran
- Coordinates: 34°02′01″N 46°56′00″E
- Country: Iran
- Province: Kermanshah
- County: Kermanshah
- Bakhsh: Firuzabad
- Rural District: Sar Firuzabad

Population (2006)
  - Total: 63
- Time zone: UTC+3:30 (IRST)
  - Summer (DST): UTC+4:30 (IRDT)

Akhundi (Persian: اخوندي, also Romanized as Ākhūndī) is a village in Sar Firuzabad Rural District, Firuzabad District, Kermanshah County, Kermanshah Province, Iran. At the 2006 census, its population was 63, in 14 families.
