= Boneh-ye Akhund, Khuzestan =

Boneh-ye Akhund بنه اخوند
- Village
- Location within Iran
- Coordinates: 31°15′52″N 49°37′37″E
- Country: Iran
- Province: Khuzestan
- County: Ramhormoz
- Bakhsh: Central
- Rural District: Howmeh-ye Sharqi

Population (2006)
  - Total: 676
- Time zone: UTC+3:30 (IRST)
  - Summer (DST): UTC+4:30 (IRDT)

Boneh-ye Akhund (Persian: بنه اخوند, also Romanized as Boneh-ye Ākhūnd; also known as Akhoond and Ākhūnd) is a village in Howmeh-ye Sharqi Rural District, in the Central District of Ramhormoz County, Khuzestan Province, Iran. At the 2006 census, its population was 676, in 159 families.
