= Akhun, Republic of Bashkortostan =

Akhun Ахун
- Selo
- Location within Bashkortostan Location within Russia
- Coordinates: 54°51′N 54°38′E
- Country: Russia
- Region: Bashkortostan
- District: Buzdyaksky District
- Time zone: UTC+5:00

Akhun (Russian: Ахун; Bashkir: Ахун, Axun) is a rural locality (a selo) in Kuzeyevsky Selsoviet, Buzdyaksky District, Bashkortostan, Russia. The population was 387 as of 2010. There are 5 streets.

== Geography ==
Akhun is located 43 km north of Buzdyak (the district's administrative centre) by road. Kuzeyevo is the nearest rural locality.
