= Rein Ahun =

Estonian sport coach

Rein Ahun (22 March 1940 – 14 December 2016) was an Estonian athletics coach.

He was born in Valga. In 1963 he graduated from Tartu State University's Institute of Physical Education.

In youth he was an athlete. 1954–1959 he was coached by Meinhard Kukli, and 1959–1963 Valter Kalam. He was focused on hammer throw.

From 1963 until 1967, he was a track and field athletics coach at Trudovye Rezervy. From 1980 until 1984, he was a lecturer at the Tallinn Polytechnic Institute. From 1984, he was an athletics coach at the Karksi-Nuia sports club, and from 1984 to 2004 he was also a physical education teacher at the August Kitzberg Gymnasium. Among his students were Margus Hunt and Märt Israel.

Awards:

- 2003: (Estonian: Eesti Kultuurkapitali kehakultuuri ja spordi sihtkapitali aastapreemia)
- 2006: state sports prize (Estonian: riiklik spordipreemia)
- 2006: Order of the White Star, V class
