= Bazar Mahalleh, Gilan =

Bazar Mahalleh بازارمحله
- Village
- Location within Iran
- Coordinates: 36°44′30″N 50°18′42″E
- Country: Iran
- Province: Gilan
- County: Rudsar
- Bakhsh: Rahimabad
- Rural District: Siyarastaq Yeylaq

Population (2006)
  - Total: 27
- Time zone: UTC+3:30 (IRST)
  - Summer (DST): UTC+4:30 (IRDT)

Bazar Mahalleh (Persian: بازارمحله, also Romanized as Bāzār Maḩalleh) is a village in Siyarastaq Yeylaq Rural District, Rahimabad District, Rudsar County, Gilan Province, Iran. At the 2006 census, its population was 27, in 10 families.
