= Rustem Akhunov =

Russian economist and politician (born 1978)

- Рустем Ринатович Ахунов
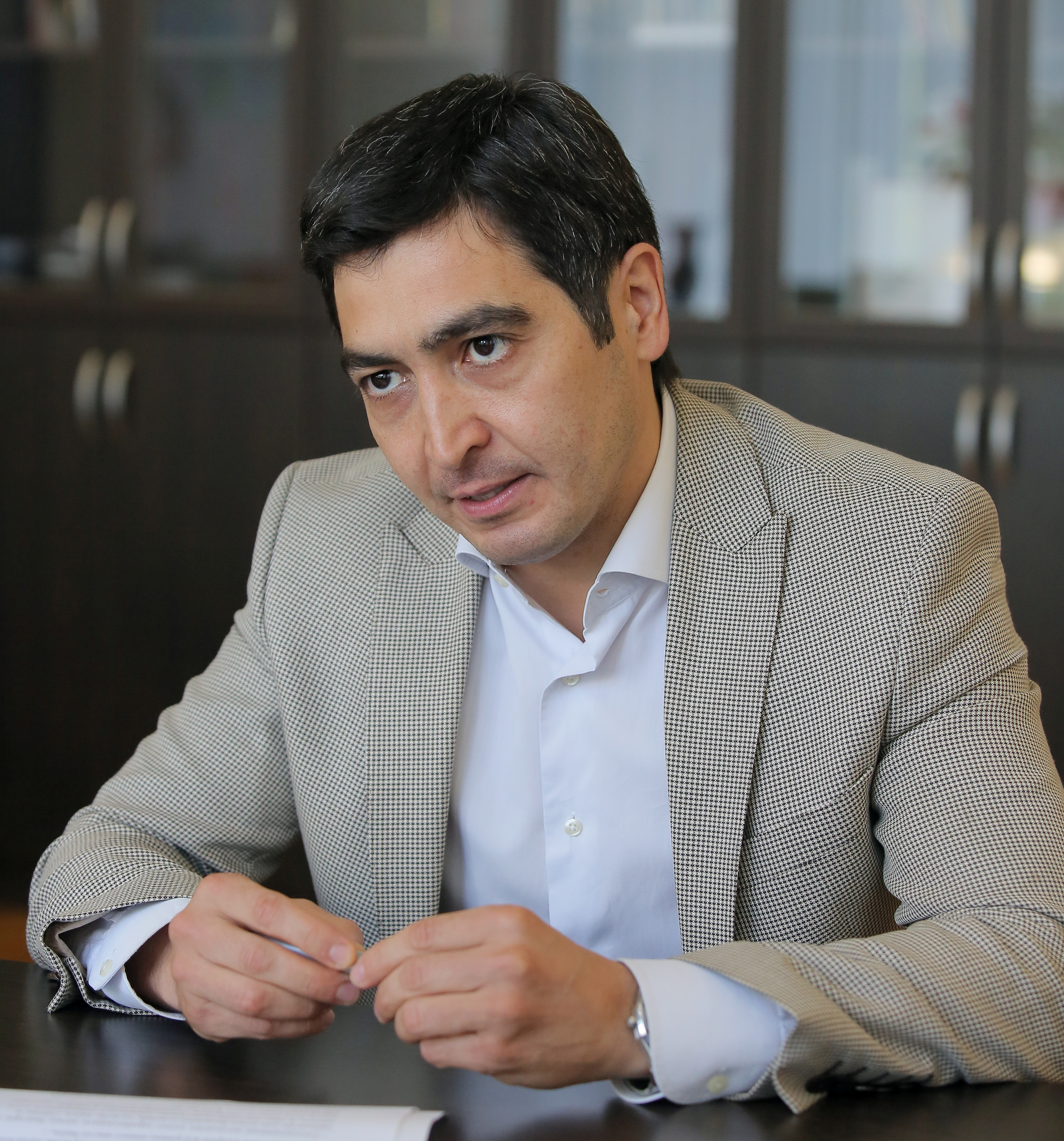
- Born: August 22, 1978 (age 47); Ufa, Bashkir Autonomous Soviet Socialist Republic
- Education: Candidate of Economics, Bashkir State University, 2003); Doctor of Business Administration (High School of Corporate Management, 2011); Doctor of Business Administration (European University, 2012); Doctor of Economics (BashSU Institute of Economics, Finance and Business, 2018),
- Awards: Commemorative medal ‘For significant contribution to the preparations and events of the 22nd Winter Olympic Games and 11th Winter Paralympic Games in Sochi 2014’; Badge of Excellence in Education of Bashkortostan (2015); Honorary Certificate of The Government of Bashkortostan (2017)
- Scientific career
- Fields: Regional economics
- Institutions: Ufa Federal Research Centre of the Russian Academy of Sciences
- Theses: The region as a functional subsystem of the national economy (2003); Management of regional development through the interaction of reproduction potential and competitiveness (2017)
- Doctoral advisors: K.N. Yusupov

Rustem Rinatovich Akhunov (Русте́м Рина́тович Аху́нов; born August 22, 1978) is a Russian economist and politician. He holds a DEc degrees from BashSU Institute for Economics, Finance, and Business, and Ufa State Petroleum Technological University, and two DBA degrees from the High School of Corporate Management, and European University (Switzerland). He's the Chief Science Officer, and the head of Laboratory of Regional Economics Issues; a former dean of the Institute for Economics, Finance and Business of Bashkir State University, and a former Acting Chairman of the Ufa Federal Research Center of Russian Academy of Science. Deputy of the 6th convocation of the State Assembly - Kurultai of the Republic of Bashkortostan (2018-2023).

== Biography ==
Akhunov was born in Ufa on August 22, 1978. He graduated from Bashkir State University (BashSU) Faculty of Economics (2000) and was granted the Candidate of Economic Sciences degree in 2003. He continued his education in the Russian Presidential Academy of National Economy and Public Administration and received a Master of Business Administration degree from the Institute of Business and Administration (2008) and Doctor of Business Administration (2011) from the High School of Corporate Management. In 2012 he was granted another DBA degree from the European University. In 2017 he complete an education course for top university managers, public administrators, and corporate managers in fields of social and science at Moscow School of Management SKOLKOVO. In 2018 he was granted the Doctor of Economic Sciences degree.

== Occupation ==
=== Science ===
Akhunov worked in BashSU since 2002. He was an assistant, senior lecturer and associate professor at the Department of National Economy. In 2011 he was elected as the dean of the Faculty of Economics. He redefined its strategic goals and built up the management team to reorganize the Faculty into the Institute of Economics, Finance, and Business. The Institute had soon become a notable regional scientific and educational center for economics and management. In 2017—2018 Akhunov worked BashSU deputy rector for strategic development. In 2018 he was elected as a corresponding member of the Academy of Sciences of the Republic of Bashkortostan. From 2018 to 2019 he was the Chairman ad interim of Ufa Federal Research Centre of the Russian Academy of Sciences. Since 2019 he works as the Chief Science Officer and the head of the Laboratory of Regional Economics Issues.

=== Politics and public service ===
Akhunov is a deputy of the 6th convocation of the State Assembly of the Republic of Bashkortostan, a member of the local political council of the Bashkortostan branch of the United Russia party, a member of the regional committee of the All-Russia People's Front in Bashkortostan. Akhunov's public activities correspond with his scientific focus on regional economics. He is a co-author of the Strategy for Socio-Economic Development of Republic of Bashkortostan until 2030.

Akhunov was the public representative of the Agency for Strategic Initiatives and Project Support at Bashkortostan. He also worked in numerous parliamentarian, governmental, and scientific commissions and committees, such as:

- Bashkortostan Governmental Committee for Young Scientists and Engineers Grants Distribution;
- The Supervisory Board of the Institute for Strategic Studies of Bashkortostan Republic;
- The Regional Committee for the "Science" National Project;
- Scientific Coordination Council of the National Academy of Sciences of Bashkortostan;
- Member of International Regional Studies Association (RSA);
- Bashkortostan Interdepartamental Governmental Commission for Budget Drafting;
- State Assembly Budget Committee Advisory Council for Fiscal, Tax and Investment Policy and Territorial Development;
- Public Council for the Improvement of Investment Environment at President's Office of Republic of Bashkortostan;
- Project Office at the Ministry of Economic Development of Bashkortostan;
- Advisory Board at Public Chamber of Bashkortostan;
- The Board of Ministry of Economic Development of Bashkortostan;
- The Council of Rectors of Republic of Bashkortostan.

== Publications ==
Akhunov has over 160 publications, including monographs, textbooks, and articles in peer-reviewed journals. He's also a member of editorial boards of "Bashkortostan Finance Journal" and "Economics and Management: Scientific and Practical Journal".

- Managing competitiveness in the system of the reproductive potential of a region: monograph / R. R. Akhunov. – Ufa: BashSU Printing and publications center, 2015. – 242 p.
- The Assessment of the dynamics of region's participation in interregional and international exchange processes based on the change in the ratio of intermediate and final products / K.N. Yusupov, A.V. Yangirov, R. R. Akhunov, Yu.S. Toktamysheva // Economy of the Region. – 2017. – Book.13, issue 2. – 640 p. – p. 559-569.
- Performance-based pay – a new (mixed) payment scheme for Russian civil servants. / Grinberg R.S., Akhunov R.R., Volodin A.I., Gubarev R.V., Dzyuba E.I. // Economic and Social Changes: Facts, Trends, Forecast. – Moscow. – 2018. – Book. 11. – No. 6. – P. 163–183. – 1 printed sheet. (author of 0.7 ps). web of science DOI: 10.15838 / ESC.2018.6.60.10
- Bashkortostan: 5 years of development in the eyes of the media: Information edition / Akhunov R.R. – Ufa: Aeterna, 2023.-158 p.

== Awards and honors ==
Akhunov received scholarships from the President of Bashkortostan (2002), Fedorenko International Scientific Foundation of Economic Research (2003), Academic Council of BashSU (2005). He was also granted a number of awards

- Commemorative medal ‘For significant contribution to the preparations and events of the 22nd Winter Olympic Games and 11th Winter Paralympic Games in Sochi 2014’:
- Badge of Excellence in Education of Bashkortostan (2015)
- Honorary Certificate of The Government of Bashkortostan (2017)
- The Honored Professor of Abkhazian State University (2017)
- Honorary Certificate of the Government of Bashkortostan "for the support in the implementation of best practices of Russian National Rating of Investment Environment in the Republic of Bashkortostan"
- The Public Medal of Committee for Public Medals and Commemorative Badges of Bashkortostan "for success and diligence in work"
