= Akhund (disambiguation) =

Akhund or Akhoond is a Persian title or surname for Islamic scholars in Iran, Afghanistan, Tajikistan, Pakistan, Bangladesh and Azerbaijan.

Akhund may also refer to:

== Places ==
- Akhund, Iran (disambiguation), a number of places in Iran

== People ==
=== Title or first name ===
- Akhund Darweza (1553-1638), Sufi and Islamic scholar, one of the caliphs of Sayyid Ali Tirmizi
- Akhund Azizullah Muttalawi, Muslim theologian from Sindh, translator of the Quran from Arabic into Sindhi
- Akhund Mullah Mohammad Kashani, 19th century Islamic mystic, philosopher, sage, Shiite scholar

=== Surname ===
==== Akhund ====
- Abdul Haq Akhund, Deputy Interior Minister for Counter Narcotics in Afghanistan
- Hají Ákhúnd, title of Ḥají Mullá ʻAlí-Akbar S͟hahmírzádí, eminent follower of Baháʼu'lláh, the founder of the Baháʼí Faith
- Hasan Akhund, Prime Minister of the Islamic Emirate of Afghanistan from 2021
- Mohammed Isa Akhund, Minister of Minerals and Petroleum in Afghanistan
- Mullah Shirin Akhund, Governor of Kabul, Afghanistan
- Obaidullah Akhund (c. 1968 – 2010), Defence Minister under the Taliban government in Afghanistan

==== Akhoond ====
- Imran Muhammad Akhoond, Pakistani guitarist, music composer songwriter

== See also ==
- Akhun (disambiguation)
