= Akhund Melk =

Akhund Melk اخوندملك
- Village
- Location within Iran
- Coordinates: 36°59′39″N 50°19′01″E
- Country: Iran
- Province: Gilan
- County: Rudsar
- Bakhsh: Rahimabad
- Rural District: Rahimabad

Population (2006)
  - Total: 206
- Time zone: UTC+3:30 (IRST)
  - Summer (DST): UTC+4:30 (IRDT)

Akhund Melk (Persian: اخوندملك, also Romanized as Ākhūnd Melk) is a village in Rahimabad Rural District, Rahimabad District, Rudsar County, Gilan Province, Iran. At the 2006 census, its population was 206, in 50 families.
