= Akhund Mahalleh, Ardabil =

Akhund Mahalleh
- Location in Iran
- Coordinates: 37.389°N 48.736°E
- Country: Iran
- Province: Ardabil Province
- Time zone: UTC+3:30 (IRST)
  - Summer (DST): UTC+4:30 (IRDT)

Akhund Mahalleh is a village in the Ardabil Province of Iran.
