= Goli Jan Rural District =

Rural district in Mazandaran province, Iran

Goli Jan Rural District Persian: دهستان گليجان
- Rural District
- Location within Iran
- Coordinates: 36°42′N 50°41′E
- Country: Iran
- Province: Mazandaran
- County: Tonekabon
- District: Central
- Established: 1987
- Capital: Soleymanabad

Population (2016)
  - Total: 23,643
- Time zone: UTC+3:30 (IRST)

Goli Jan Rural District (Persian: دهستان گليجان) is in the Central District of Tonekabon County, Mazandaran province, Iran. Its capital is the village of Soleymanabad.

== Demographics ==
=== Population ===
At the time of the 2006 National Census, the rural district's population was 34,341 in 9,815 households. There were 24,342 inhabitants in 7,645 households at the following census of 2011. The 2016 census measured the population of the rural district as 23,643 in 8,230 households. The most populous of its 119 villages was Ammariyeh, with 2,395 people.

=== Other villages in the rural district ===
- Akhund Mahalleh
- Chala Sar
- Chenarbon
- Goli Jan
- Kashku
- Khowban Razgah
- Lazarbon
- Nasirabad
- Salimabad
