= Tonekabon County =

County in Mazandaran province, Iran

Tonekabon County Persian: شهرستان تنکابن
- County
- Location of Tonekabon County in Mazandaran province (left, green)

- Location of Mazandaran province in Iran
- Coordinates: 36°35′N 50°50′E
- Country: Iran
- Province: Mazandaran
- Capital: Tonekabon
- Districts: Central, Khorramabad, Kuhestan, Nashta

Population (2016)
  - Total: 166,132
- Time zone: UTC+3:30 (IRST)

Tonekabon County (Persian: شهرستان تنکابن) is in Mazandaran province, Iran. Its capital is the city of Tonekabon.

== History ==
The village of Shirud was converted to a city upon the merger of 19 villages in 2008. In 2009, Abbasabad District was separated from the county in the establishment of Abbasabad County.

In 2020, Baladeh-ye Sharqi Rural District was created in Khorramabad District, and Do Hezar and Seh Hezar Rural Districts were separated from it in the formation of Kuhestan District, which was divided into three rural districts, including the new Miyandaman Rural District.

== Demographics ==
=== Population ===
At the time of the 2006 National Census, the county's population was 193,428 in 55,318 households. The following census in 2011 counted 153,940 people in 48,845 households. The 2016 census measured the population of the county as 166,132 in 56,636 households.

=== Administrative divisions ===
Tonekabon County's population history and administrative structure over three consecutive censuses are shown in the following table.

Tonekabon County Population
Administrative Divisions	2006	2011	2016
Central District	85,739	88,947	99,190
Goli Jan RD	34,341	24,342	23,643
Mir Shams ol Din RD	8,270	8,838	8,736
Shirud (city) (Note: Merger of 19 villages)		10,429	11,377
Tonekabon (city)	43,128	45,338	55,434
Abbasabad District (Note: Transferred to Abbasabad County)	45,589		
Kelarabad RD (Note: Renamed Kelarabad-e Gharbi Rural District)	8,445		
Langarud RD (Note: Renamed Langarud-e Sharqi Rural District)	10,839		
Abbasabad (city)	11,256		
Kelarabad (city)	5,457		
Salman Shahr (city)	9,592		
Khorramabad District	37,517	40,263	41,006
Baladeh RD	25,099	26,330	25,830
Baladeh-ye Sharqi RD (Note: Established after the 2016 census)			
Do Hezar RD	1,494	2,789	2,326
Seh Hezar RD	988	2,030	1,308
Khorramabad (city)	9,936	9,114	11,542
Kuhestan District			
Do Hezar RD			
Miyandaman RD			
Seh Hezar RD			
Nashta District	24,583	24,730	25,935
Katra RD (Note: Formerly Nashtarud Rural District)	8,032	8,140	8,147
Tameshkol RD	10,714	10,948	11,394
Nashtarud (city)	5,837	5,642	6,394
Total	193,428	153,940	166,132
RD = Rural District

== See also ==
Media related to Tonekabon County at Wikimedia Commons
