= Central District (Tonekabon County) =

District in Mazandaran province, Iran

Central District (Tonekabon County) Persian: بخش مرکزی شهرستان تنكابن
- District
- Location within Iran
- Coordinates: 36°42′N 50°41′E
- Country: Iran
- Province: Mazandaran
- County: Tonekabon
- Capital: Tonekabon

Population (2016)
  - Total: 99,190
- Time zone: UTC+3:30 (IRST)

The Central District of Tonekabon County (Persian: بخش مرکزی شهرستان تنكابن) is in Mazandaran province, Iran. Its capital is the city of Tonekabon.

== History ==
The village of Shirud was converted to a city upon the merger of 19 villages in 2008.

== Demographics ==
=== Population ===
At the time of the 2006 National Census, the district's population was 85,739 in 25,304 households. The following census in 2011 counted 88,947 people in 28,549 households. The 2016 census measured the population of the district as 99,190 inhabitants in 33,808 households.

=== Administrative divisions ===
Central District (Tonekabon County) Population
Administrative Divisions	2006	2011	2016
Goli Jan RD	34,341	24,342	23,643
Mir Shams ol Din RD	8,270	8,838	8,736
Shirud (city) (Note: Merger of 19 villages)		10,429	11,377
Tonekabon (city)	43,128	45,338	55,434
Total	85,739	88,947	99,190
RD = Rural District
