= List of tallest structures in Iran =

This is a list of the tallest structures in Iran. The list contains all types of structures.

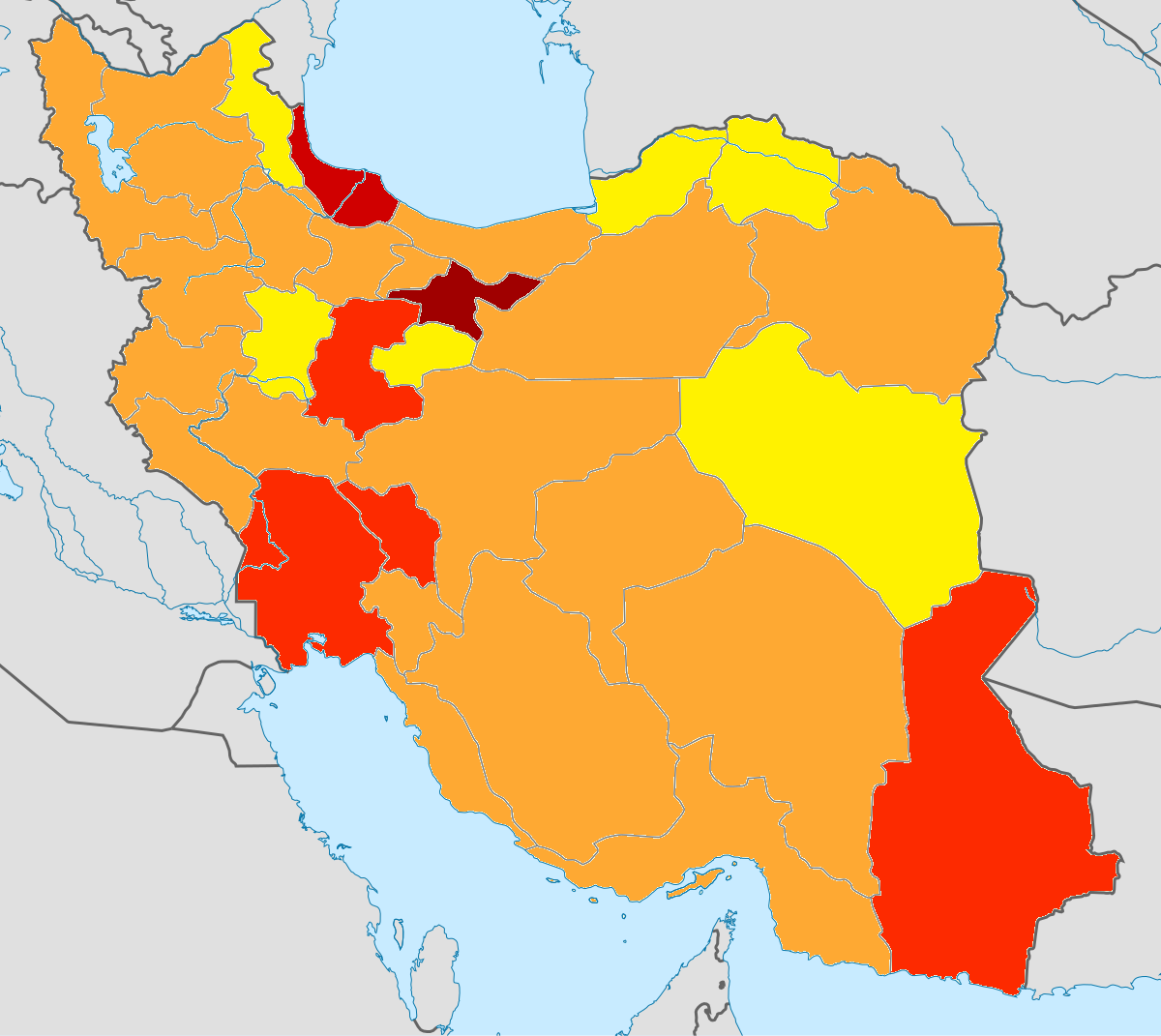
tallest completed structures in Iran provinces 2020 +400m +300m +200m +100m +50m

== List ==
Rank	Name	Place	Height (metres)	Image
1	Milad Tower	Tehran	435	
2	Ziba Kenar television station	Rasht	365	
3	Zahidan Mediumwave Transmitter	Nazarabad	276	
4	Western Mast of Gol Dasteh Mediumwave Transmitter	Gol Dasteh	256	
5	Karun-4 Dam	Shahr-e Kord	230	
5	Fereshteh Pasargad Hotel (under construction)	Tehran	230	
6	Karun-3 Dam	Izeh	205	
7	Dez Dam	Andimeshk	203	
8	Shiraz World Trade Center	Shiraz	200	
8	Shazand Power Plant	Shazand	200	
9	Amir Kabir Dam	Karaj	180	
9	Seimare Dam	Darreh Shahr	180	
10	Tehran International Tower	Tehran	162	
11	World Trade Center Tabriz	Tabriz	152	
12	Shahd Rajai Power Plant	Qazvin	150	
12	Fars Hotel (under construction)	Shiraz	150	
12	Motel Gho	Salman Shahr	150	
13	Tehran Muslla finials	Tehran	140	
14	Shahid Rajaee Dam	Sari	138	
15	Jiroft Dam	Jiroft	134	
16	White Tower	Tehran	132	
17	Karkheh Dam	Andimeshk	127	
18	Marjan Towers	Tehran	125	
19	B3 Mahestan Tower	Tehran	123	
19	Damavand Tower (under construction)	Tehran	122	
19	Aseman Tower	Tehran	122	
20	Musalla Towers	Isfahan	120	
20	Third Millennium Tower (under construction)	Tehran	118.5	
20	Shahid Montazeri Power Plant	Isfahan	118	
21	Sepehr Tower	Tehran	115	
22	Negar Tower	Tehran	114	
23	Chamran Grand Hotel	Shiraz	110	
23	Baran 2 Tower	Mashhad	110	
23	Ghoghnoos Tower (under construction)	Semnan	110	
23	Latyan Dam	Lavasan	107	
25	Sefidrud Dam	Manjil	106	
26	Saman Complex	Tehran	105	
27	Isfahan City Center Towers Complex	Isfahan	103	
27	Qazvin Trade Tower (under construction)	Qazvin	103	
28	Rais Ali Dilavari Dam	Borazjan	102	
29	Shahran Tower	Tabriz	100	
29	Zayanderud Dam	Chadegan	100	
29	Elahieh Twin Towers	Tehran	100	
30	Makki Mosque	Zahedan	94	
31	Mausoleum of Ruhollah Khomeini finials	Tehran	91	
32	Ghadir Bridge	Ahvaz	81	
33	Mellat Park Carousels	Mashhad	80	
34	Bank Markazi Tower	Tehran	74	
35	Eskan Tower	Tehran	72	
35	Gonbad-e Qabus	Gonbad-e Qabus	72	
36	Alton Tower (under construction)	Mashhad	70	
36	Saman Twin Towers	Tehran	70	
37	Tehran Stock Exchange building	Tehran	68	
38	Milad Hospital	Tehran	63	
39	Gorgan Tower	Gorgan	57	

== See also ==
- List of tallest buildings in Iran
- List of tallest buildings in Tehran
