= List of tallest buildings in Iran =

This is a list of the tallest buildings in Iran with a structural height of at least 100 m (330 ft).

As of 2026, the Fereshteh Pasargad Hotel in Tehran is the tallest building in Iran, having topped out at a height of 235 m (771 ft). Although the building has reached its full height, it remains in the final stages of completion.

Although the Milad Tower is the tallest structure in Iran at 435 m (1,427 ft), it is excluded from this list. It is classified as a telecommunications and observation tower rather than a building because its habitable floor area occupies less than 50% of its total height. Despite its use as a major tourism hub, it remains categorized as a self-supporting tower.

== Tallest buildings ==
Was the tallest building in Iran upon completion

Rank	Name	Image	City	Height m (ft)	Floors	Year	Notes
1	Fereshteh Pasargad Hotel		Tehran	235 m (771 ft)	46	2026	Tallest building in Iran. Designed by Zaha Hadid.
2	Tabriz World Trade Center		Tabriz	192 m (630 ft)	37	2019	Tallest building in Iran from 2019 to 2026. Tallest building in Tabriz.
3=	Saman Faraz Twin Tower 1		Tehran	185 m (607 ft)	50	2024	
3=	Saman Faraz Twin Tower 2		Tehran	185 m (607 ft)	50	2024	
5	Odima Tower		Nur	170 m (560 ft)	38	N/D	Topped out; tallest residential building in Iran.
6	Tehran International Tower		Tehran	162 m (531 ft)	56	2007	Tallest building in Iran from 2007 to 2019.
7	Jahan Koodak Building		Tehran	153 m (502 ft)	34	2019	Shelled by Israel in 2025.
8	Armitaj Golshan Tower		Mashhad	152 m (499 ft)	34	2016	Tallest building in Mashhad.
9	Fars Tower		Shiraz	150 m (490 ft)	35	N/D	Tallest building in Shiraz. Also known as Persian Gulf Hotel. Topped out, but never completed.
10	Telecommunication Twin Towers		Tehran	149.8 m (491 ft)	30	2024	
11	Zarafshan Commercial Office Building		Tehran	138.4 m (454 ft)	27	2025	
12	Anahid Tower		Tehran	135.4 m (444 ft)	36	2020	
13	Borj-e Sefid		Tehran	134 m (440 ft)	22	1994	Tallest building in Iran from 1994 to 2007. Also known as White Tower.
14=	Gran Meliá Ghoo Hotel Tower		Salman Shahr	130 m (430 ft)	33	N/D	Tallest building in Salman Shahr. Also known as Middle East Diamond. Topped out, but never completed.
14=	Aseman Tower		Tehran	130 m (430 ft)	37	2002	
14=	Hormozan Tower 21		Tehran	130 m (430 ft)	34	2021	
14=	Prestige Hotel		Isfahan	130 m (430 ft)	29	N/D	
14=	Top Island Tower 1		Qeshm	130 m (430 ft)	33	N/D	Tallest building in Qeshm.
19	Afra Tower		Tehran	128 m (420 ft)	38	N/D	
20	Qazvin Trade Tower		Qazvin	125 m (410 ft)	30	2023	Tallest building in Qazvin.
21	B3 Tower		Tehran	122 m (400 ft)	30	2007	
22=	Imperial Medical Center		Tehran	120 m (390 ft)	36	2003	
22=	Pazh Tower		Mashhad	120 m (390 ft)	27	N/D	
22=	Third Millennium Tower		Tehran	120 m (390 ft)	36	N/D	Remains unfinished due to legal disputes, financial mismanagement, and safety concerns.
25	Sepehr Tower		Tehran	115 m (377 ft)	33	1991	Tallest building in Iran from 1991 to 1994.
26	Negar Tower		Tehran	114 m (374 ft)	31	2002	
27	Chitgar 6		Tehran	112.9 m (370 ft)	30	2019	
28=	Mehr Tower		Ahvaz	110 m (360 ft)	25	N/D	Tallest building in Ahvaz.
28=	Baran 2 Tower		Mashhad	110 m (360 ft)	27	N/D	
30	Chamran Grand Hotel		Shiraz	109 m (358 ft)	30	2011	
31	Jaam Tower		Tehran	108.3 m (355 ft)	26	2015	
32=	Sefid Tower		Sorkhrud	108 m (354 ft)	29	N/D	
32=	Miniature Tower		Mashhad	108 m (354 ft)	27	N/D	
34	Saba Tower		Tehran	105.3 m (345 ft)	28	N/D	
35=	Parsa Tower		Tehran	105 m (344 ft)	32	2000	
35=	Atisaz Residential Complex		Tehran	105 m (344 ft)	31	1977	Tallest building in Iran from 1977 to 1991.
35=	Farmaneih Residential Commercial Tower		Tehran	105 m (344 ft)	28	2005	
35=	Yas Tower		Mashhad	105 m (344 ft)	30	N/D	
35=	Pars Tower		Tehran	105 m (344 ft)	20	2011	Also known as Central Insurance Building and Bime Markazi Tower.
40=	Farhangian Twin Tower 1		Qazvin	104 m (341 ft)	28	N/D	
40=	Farhangian Twin Tower 2		Qazvin	104 m (341 ft)	28	N/D	
42	Isfahan City Center Business and Residential Towers		Isfahan	103 m (338 ft)	22	N/D	
43=	Shahgoli Towers Phase 2		Tehran	101.6 m (333 ft)	27	1967	Tallest building in Iran from 1967 to 1977. Also known as Khayam Tower 2.
43=	Shahgoli Towers Phase 3		Tehran	101.6 m (333 ft)	27	1968	Also known as Pasargad Tower 2.
43=	Negin Reza Tower		Tehran	101.6 m (333 ft)	27	2012	
43=	Omid 2 Tower		Tehran	101.6 m (333 ft)	27	2015	
47=	Shahran Tower		Tabriz	100 m (330 ft)	30	2013	
47=	Tehran Twin Towers, Tower 1		Tehran	100 m (330 ft)	28	2008	
47=	Tehran Twin Towers, Tower 2		Tehran	100 m (330 ft)	28	2006	
47=	Golnar Tower		Tehran	100 m (330 ft)	27	2001	

== Under construction ==
Name	Height m (ft)	Floors	Planned Completion	City	Notes
Iran Mall World Trade Tower	350 m (1,150 ft)	53	2027	Tehran	Will become the tallest building and the first supertall skyscraper in Iran upon completion.
Caspian	230 m (750 ft)	66		Abyek	Deeply on hold.
Padide Shandiz	225 m (738 ft)	34		Mashhad	Deeply on hold since January 2015 due to fraud investigation launched by the Iranian Judiciary.
Aysan Twin Towers	210 m (690 ft)	43		Tabriz	Deeply on hold.
Shiraz World Trade Center	200 m (660 ft)	47		Shiraz	Deeply on hold.
Sepehr Elahieh Tower	170 m (560 ft)	44		Tehran	
Marjan Nedaja Tower 1	150 m (490 ft)	42		Tehran	Deeply on hold.
Marjan Nedaja Tower 2	150 m (490 ft)	42		Tehran	Deeply on hold.
Ayrana Tower	150 m (490 ft)	30		Tehran	
Atieh Hospital 2	120 m (390 ft)	25		Tehran	

== Proposed ==
Name	Height m (ft)	Floors	City	Notes
Tabriz Towers	340 m (1,120 ft)	90	Tabriz	Considered a stale proposal.
National Iranian Gas Company Headquarters	215 m (705 ft)	40	Tehran	Designed by Hadi Teherani. Won the international competition for the new National Iranian Gas Company headquarters in Tehran. As of 2026, no start date has been set for construction.

== Unbuilt ==
Name	Height m (ft)	Floors	City	Notes
Iran-Tabriz WTC 2	218 m (715 ft)	56	Tabriz	Cancelled
Flower of the East	210 m (690 ft)	45	Kish	Construction began in 2004 and was slated for completion by 2010, but the project was eventually cancelled in 2007 due to an alleged failure to finalize financing arrangements for the €1.7 billion development.
Farhang Shahr Tower 1	205 m (673 ft)	49	Shiraz	Cancelled
Farhang Shahr Tower 2	197 m (646 ft)	48	Shiraz	Cancelled
Farhang Shahr Tower 3	193 m (633 ft)	47	Shiraz	Cancelled
Central Bank of Iran	192 m (630 ft)	44	Tehran	Cancelled
Kapsad Development Housing	135 m (443 ft)	38	Tehran	Cancelled due to the outbreak of the 1978–1979 Islamic Revolution.

== Timeline of the tallest buildings ==
Name	Image	Years As Tallest	Height m (ft)	Floors	City	Notes
Plasco Building (1960 - 2017)		1960–1967	42 m (138 ft)	16	Tehran	Collapsed on January 17, 2017 due to severe fire. In 2021, a new 20-story high-rise known as Plasco 1400 was constructed on the original site.
Shahgoli Towers Phase 2		1967–1977	102 m (335 ft)	27	Tehran	First building in Iran to exceed 100 m (328 ft).
Atisaz Residential Complex		1977–1991	105 m (344 ft)	31	Tehran	
Sepehr Tower		1991–1994	115 m (377 ft)	33	Tehran	
Borj-e Sefid		1994–2007	134 m (440 ft)	22	Tehran	
Tehran International Tower		2007–2019	162 m (531 ft)	56	Tehran	First building in Iran to exceed 150 m (492 ft).
Tabriz World Trade Center		2019–2026	192 m (630 ft)	37	Tabriz	
Fereshteh Pasargad Hotel		2026–Present	235 m (771 ft)	46	Tehran	First building in Iran to exceed 200 m (656 ft).

== See also ==
- List of tallest buildings in Tehran
