= List of tallest buildings in Tehran =

This list ranks skyscrapers and high-rise buildings in Tehran by height. Tehran maintains the highest concentration of skyscrapers and high-rise buildings in Iran and possesses the highest population density in the country. Please note that the Milad Tower, which stands at 435 m (1,427 ft) and is the sixth-tallest telecommunications tower in the world, is excluded from this list because it is classified as an observation and telecommunications tower rather than a habitable building.

== Tallest buildings ==
Was the tallest building in Tehran upon completion
Indicates buildings that have been topped out but not yet completed

This list ranks buildings in Tehran that stand at least 100 m (328 ft) tall, based on standard height measurement. This measurement includes spires and architectural details but excludes antenna masts.

Rank	Name	Image	Height m (ft)	Floors	Year	Notes	References
1	Fereshteh Pasargad Hotel		235 m (771 ft)	46	2026	Tallest building in Iran.	
2=	Saman Faraz Twin Tower 1		185 m (607 ft)	50	2027		
2=	Saman Faraz Twin Tower 2		185 m (607 ft)	50	2027		
4	Tehran International Tower		162 m (531 ft)	56	2007	Tallest building in Iran from 2007 to 2019. Tallest residential building in Tehran.	
5	Jahan Koodak Building		153 m (502 ft)	34	2019	Shelled by Israel in 2025.	
6	Telecommunication Twin Tower 1		149.8 m (491 ft)	30	N/D	Topped out, currently on hold.	
7	Zarafshan Commercial Office Building		138.4 m (454 ft)	27	2025	Also known as Parisan Tower.	
8	Borj-e Sefid		134 m (440 ft)	22	1994	Tallest building in Iran from 1994 to 2007. Also known as White Tower.	
9	Asseman Tower		130 m (427 ft)	37	2002		
10	Mahestan B3 Tower		122 m (400 ft)	30	2007		
11=	Imperial Medical Center		120 m (394 ft)	36	2003	Tallest hospital building in Iran.	
11=	Third Millennium Tower		120 m (394 ft)	36	N/D	Topped out, currently on hold.	
13	Sepehr Tower		115 m (377 ft)	33	1991	Tallest building in Iran from 1991 to 1994.	
14	Pars Tower		105 m (344 ft)	20	2011	Also known as Bime Markazi Tower.	

== Other Completed Towers ==
- Negar Tower, 27 floors.
- Shahin Dezh I, 97 m (318 ft), 26 floors.
- Shahin Dezh II, 97 m (318 ft), 26 floors.
- Shahin Dezh III, 97 m (318 ft), 26 floors.
- Shahin Dezh IV, 97 m (318 ft), 26 floors.
- Kohe Nore Tower, 95 m (312 ft), 25 floors.
- Apadana Tower II, 92 m (302 ft), 26 floors.
- Apadana Tower III, 92 m (302 ft), 26 floors.
- Parsian Azadi Hotel (Azadi Grand Hotel), 90 m (300 ft), 26 floors.
- Bonyad-e-Tarikh Administrative Tower, 84 m (276 ft), 24 floors.
- Seda-va-sima Tower, 84 m (276 ft), 24 floors.
- Iran Zamin Towers, 80 m (260 ft), 23 floors.
- Apadana Tower I, 78 m (256 ft), 22 floors.
- Foreign Trade Bank of Iran, 75 m (246 ft), 20 floors.
- Central Bank of Iran, 74 m (243 ft) (estimated), 20 floors.
- Pejman Tower, 20 floors.
- Bucharest Tower, 72 m (236 ft), 16 floors.
- Bank Of Keshavarzi, 63 m (207 ft), 15 floors.
- Melli Complex, 55 m (180 ft), 17 floors.
- Esteghlal Grand Hotel, 16 floors.
- Homa Hotel Tehran, 16 floors.
- Milad Hospital, 15 floors.
- Qolhak Commercial Tower, 14 floors.
- Laleh International Hotel, 13 floors.
- Pavyard Apartment Complex, 13 floors.

== Under construction ==
- Fereshteh Pasargad Hotel, 210 m (690 ft), 46 floors
- Saman Faraz Tower 1, 185 m (607 ft), 50 floors
- Sama Faraz Tower 2, 185 m (607 ft), 50 floors
- Nadaja Marjan Tower 1, 150 m (490 ft), 42 floors. On hold
- Nadaja Marjan Tower 2, 150 m (490 ft), 42 floors, On hold
- Telecommunications Twin Towers 1, 149 m (489 ft), 30 floors. On hold
- Telecommunications Twin Towers 2, 149 m (489 ft), 30 floors
- AtiCenter Administrative Tower, 143 m (469 ft), 40 floors. On hold
- Tehran International Financial Center, 138 m (453 ft), 28 floors
- Espinas Palace Hotel, 118 m (387 ft), 34 floors
- Tehran Third millennium Tower, 34 floors,
- Didar Complex, 26 floors
- Alborz Tower, 26 floors
- Narges Hotel, 38 floors.
- Third Millennium Tower, 120 m (390 ft), 36 floors. On hold
- Jam Tower, 33 floors.
- AtiCenter Residential Tower 2, 110 m (360 ft), 30 floors. On hold
- AtiCenter Residential Tower 1, 110 m (360 ft), 30 floors. On hold
- Baran, 23 floors.

== Timeline of tallest buildings ==
This is a list of buildings that in the past held the title of tallest building in Tehran. This list includes only residential, office and commercial buildings. Therefore, since the Milad Tower (at 435 m (1,427 ft) is an observation and telecommunications tower, it is not listed here

Name	Image	Street address	Years as tallest	Height m	Floors	Reference
Shams-ol-Emareh		Nasir Khusraw St.	1867–1982, c.1930-1960	35 m (115 ft)	5	
Bagh-e Shah Tower		Bagh-e Shah Park	1882–c.1930	69 m (226 ft)	6	
Plasco Tower (collapsed)		Istanbul St. (Jomhuri St.)	1960–1963	42 m (138 ft)	14	
Kar Bank Tower (Tehran Stock Exchange Tower)		Hafez St.	1963–1969	68 m (223 ft)	19	
Saman Twin Towers		Keshavarz Boulevard	1969–1977	70 m (230 ft)	22	
Eskan Triple Towers		Mirdamad Boulevard	1977–1991	72 m (236 ft)	23	
Sepehr Tower	Sepehr Tower	Somayeh St.	1991–2005	115 m (377 ft)	32	
Tehran International Tower		Close to the Kordestan and Hakim Expressways bridges	2005–present	162 m (531 ft)	56	

== See also ==
- List of tallest buildings in Iran
- List of tallest structures in Iran
