= Gol Dasteh =

Gol Dasteh or Goldasteh (Persian: گلدسته) may refer to:

- Goldasteh, Hamadan
- Gol Dasteh, Kerman
- Gol Dasteh, Tehran
