= Gran Meliá Ghoo =

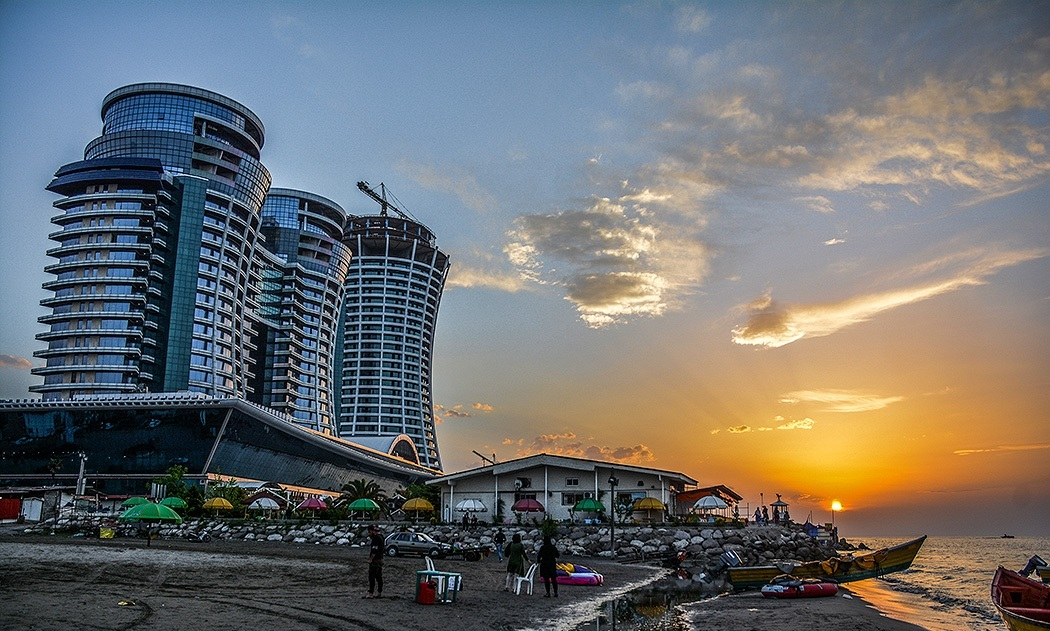
- The incomplete five-star hotel tower (left) standing adjacent to the complex's twin residential towers and retail mall.

General information
- Status: Incomplete
- Type: Hotel
- Location: Salman Shahr, Iran
- Construction started: 2016
- Construction stopped: 2019
- Completed: N/A
- Opened: N/A
- Client: Meliá Hotels International

Height
- Roof: 130 m (427 ft)

Technical details
- Floor count: 33 (Hotel Tower); 23 (Residential Towers)

Design and construction
- Architect: Mehrdad Khalilifard Fard
- Developer: Ahad Azimzadeh

The Gran Meliá Ghoo, also known as the Swan, is an unfinished five-star skyscraper hotel within a mixed-use development in Salman Shahr, Iran, situated on the shore of the Caspian Sea. Announced in 2016, the hotel was designed to be housed in a 130-meter, 33-story skyscraper, adjacent to two 23-story towers of residential apartments, all positioned above a large retail mall.

The hotel was designed to feature 319 guest rooms, seven restaurants and bars, two swimming pools, and a spa. This project was developed by the Spain-based Meliá Hotels International, and it was intended to be the first foreign branded hotel in Iran since the revolution.

As of 2026, the skyscraper is topped out at its full height, making it the tallest building in Salman Shahr, but it remains incomplete, having been indefinitely stalled in 2019 due to the impact of international sanctions and political tensions between the United States and Iran.

== Other developments ==
In addition to the incomplete hotel, the complex contains two residential apartment buildings and a completed retail mall.

If finished, the complex would have been the largest mixed use development in Iran.
