= Flower of the East =

- The Flower of the East logo

General information
- Status: Never built
- Type: Residential; Commercial
- Construction started: 2004
- Cost: €1.7 billion
- Management: Drees & Sommer AG

Technical details
- Floor area: 2.38 million square metres (25.6×10^{6} sq ft)

Design and construction
- Developer: FOE Projektgesellschaft mBH
- Structural engineer: Thalen Consult
- Main contractor: Hampa Engineering Corporation

The Flower of the East (Persian: گل شرق) complex was a €1.7 billion tourism attraction project, begun in 2004 in Kish Island and was expected to be finished by 2010. The project was cancelled in 2007. The complex was to accommodate a luxury hotel. This project was cancelled in 2017. If built, the 210-meter hotel would have been the tallest building in Iran surpassing Tehran International Tower in Tehran.

== Development project ==
The Flower of the East Development Project was the biggest project on Kish Island in the Persian Gulf. The project was slated to include three hotels, three residential areas, villas and apartment complexes, coffee shops, showrooms, stores, sports facilities and a marina. The project was managed by the German firm FOE Projektgesellschaft mbH.

Flower of the East Kish Development company, in which FOE Projektgeselschaft mbH was the 98% share holder, was registered in the Department of Registrar of Companies and Industrial and Intellectual Ownerships of Kish Free Zone Organization. It received the annual Economy Activity License for 2010 from KFZO, and also received the Amendment of the primary Foreign Investment Permission from FIPA on 05/01/2009.

Flower of the East consists of these sub-categories:

- Flower of the East Hotel
- Mainland Apartments
- Promenades: Mainland Promenade, Marina Promenade, gardens, patio & restaurants, shopping malls
- Marina: club village villas, club arcades, yacht harbour, apartments
- Harbour City
- Parc residences
- Golf villas & hotel
- Fallin Waters golf club & residences
- Hotels: beauty, spa, park, etc.

== Hotel ==
The centerpiece of the project is a hotel in the shape of a flower. The tower is a combination of Persian and modern architecture.

Due to the geographical location of the Flower of the East Hotel, the sunrise would have been seen by the hotel residents. The hotel was to be surrounded by a park.

== Marina ==
A Marina Club Village is to be constructed by Flower of the East Hotel:

- Marina Club Village is surrounded by a club park.
- Marina Club Arcade is the central attraction for fans of water sports.
- The marina offers a harbour.

== Falling Waters golf club and residences ==
The golf facilities include an 18-hole championship golf course based on PGA standards and a 9-hole course for beginners.

The properties of Falling Water Residences are between 1500 and 3500 m^{2}, and living areas are 430 to 2000 m^{2}. They can be designed and furnished according to the taste of the owner.

Falling Waters Golf Club

== See also ==
- Kish Island
