= Bagh-e Shah Tower =

19th-century observation tower in Tehran, Iran

- برج باغشاه
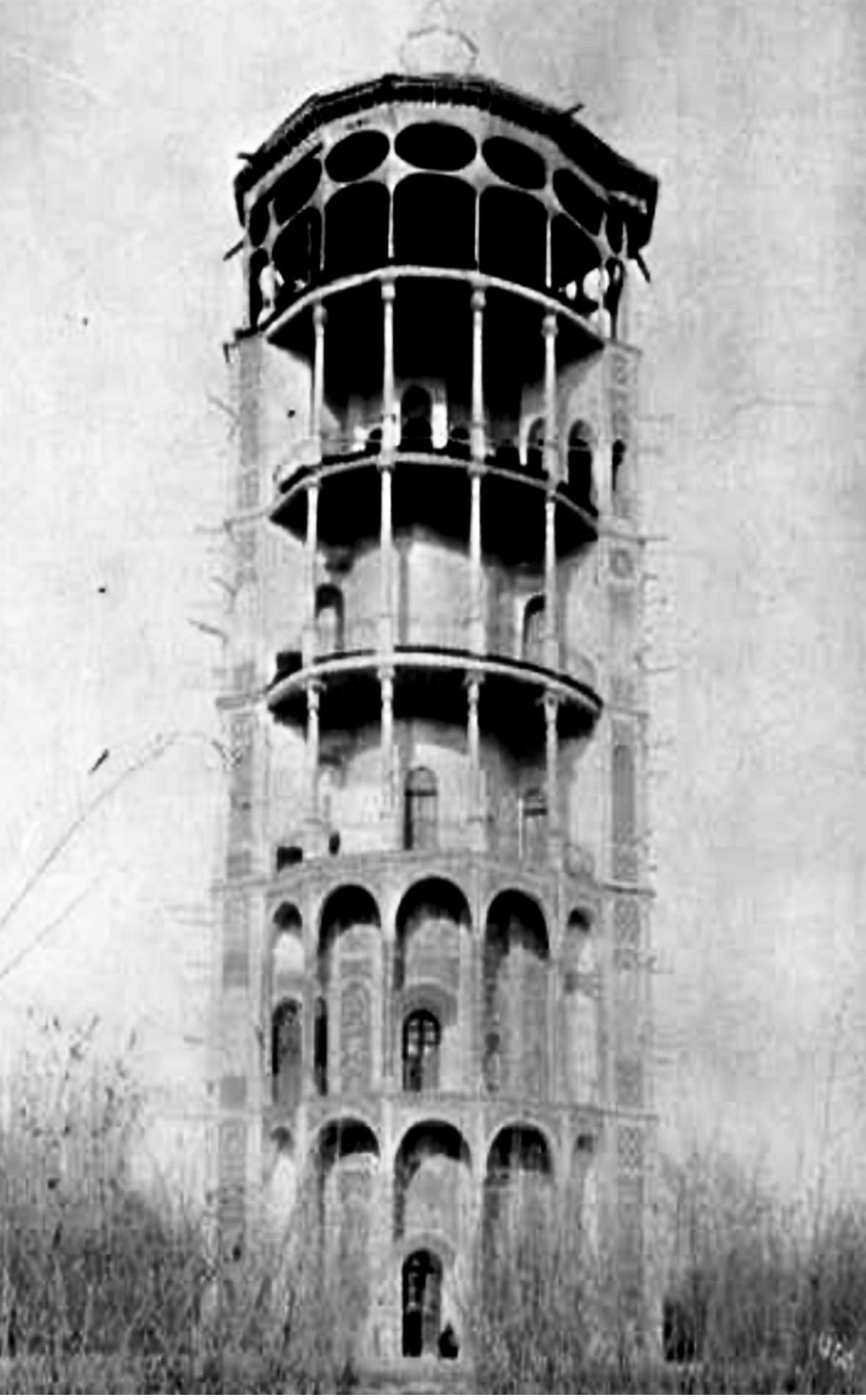

General information
- Type: Observation tower
- Location: Tehran, Iran
- Construction started: 1850s
- Completed: 1882
- Demolished: 1930s
- Owner: Naser al-Din Shah Qajar

Height
- Height: 69 meters

Technical details
- Floor count: 6

Bagh-e Shah Tower was a 19th-century observation tower erected in one of the corners of Bagh-e Shah, Tehran. The tower was the tallest buildings in Tehran from 1882 till its demolition in the 1930s.
