= Borj-e Sefid =

Building in Tehran, Iran

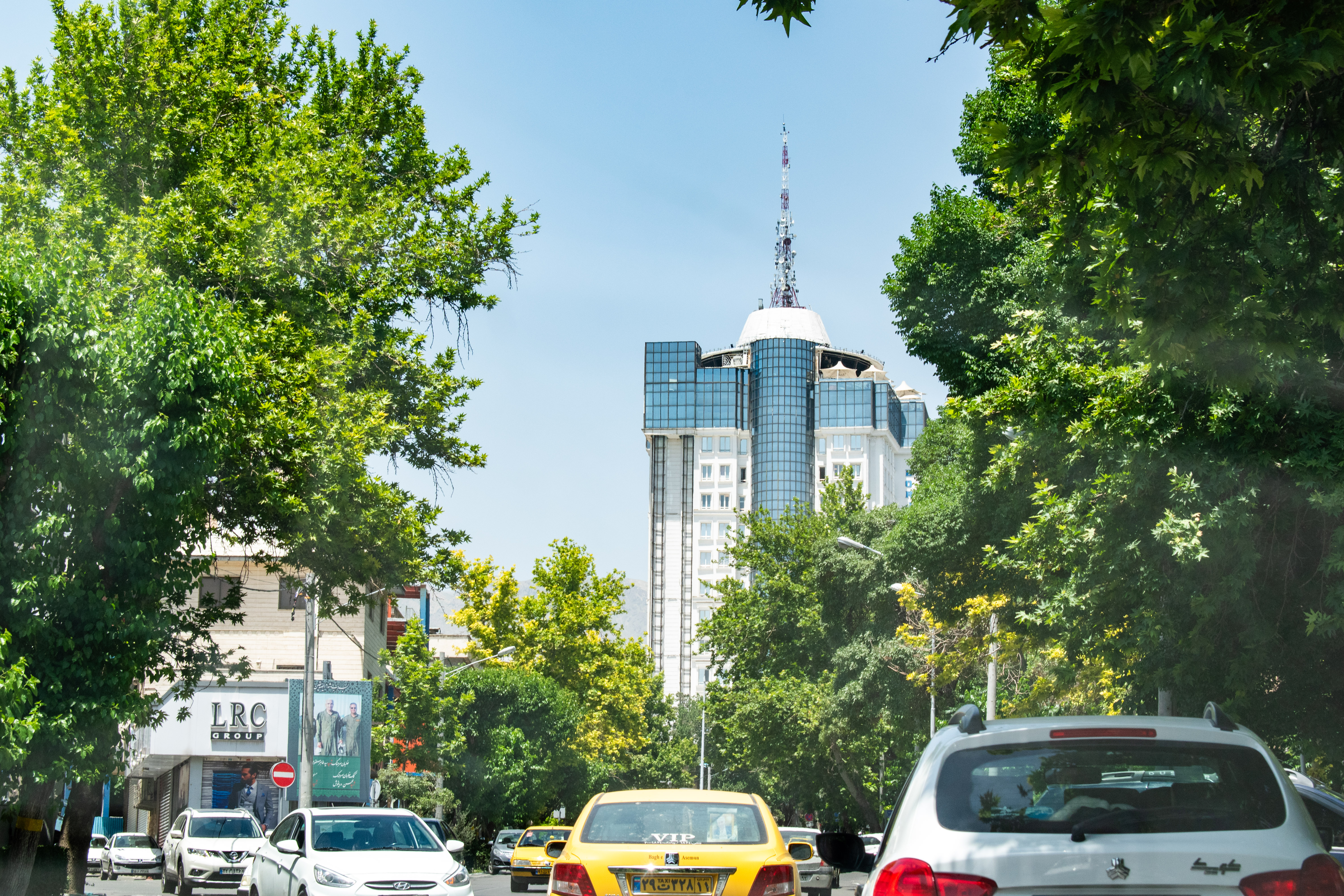
- Location: Tehran, Iran
- Mast height: 134 metres (440 ft)
- Coordinates: 35°45′59″N 51°27′22″E
- Built: 1995–1997

Borj-e Sefid (Persian: برج سفید) is a building located in Pasdaran district in Tehran, Iran.

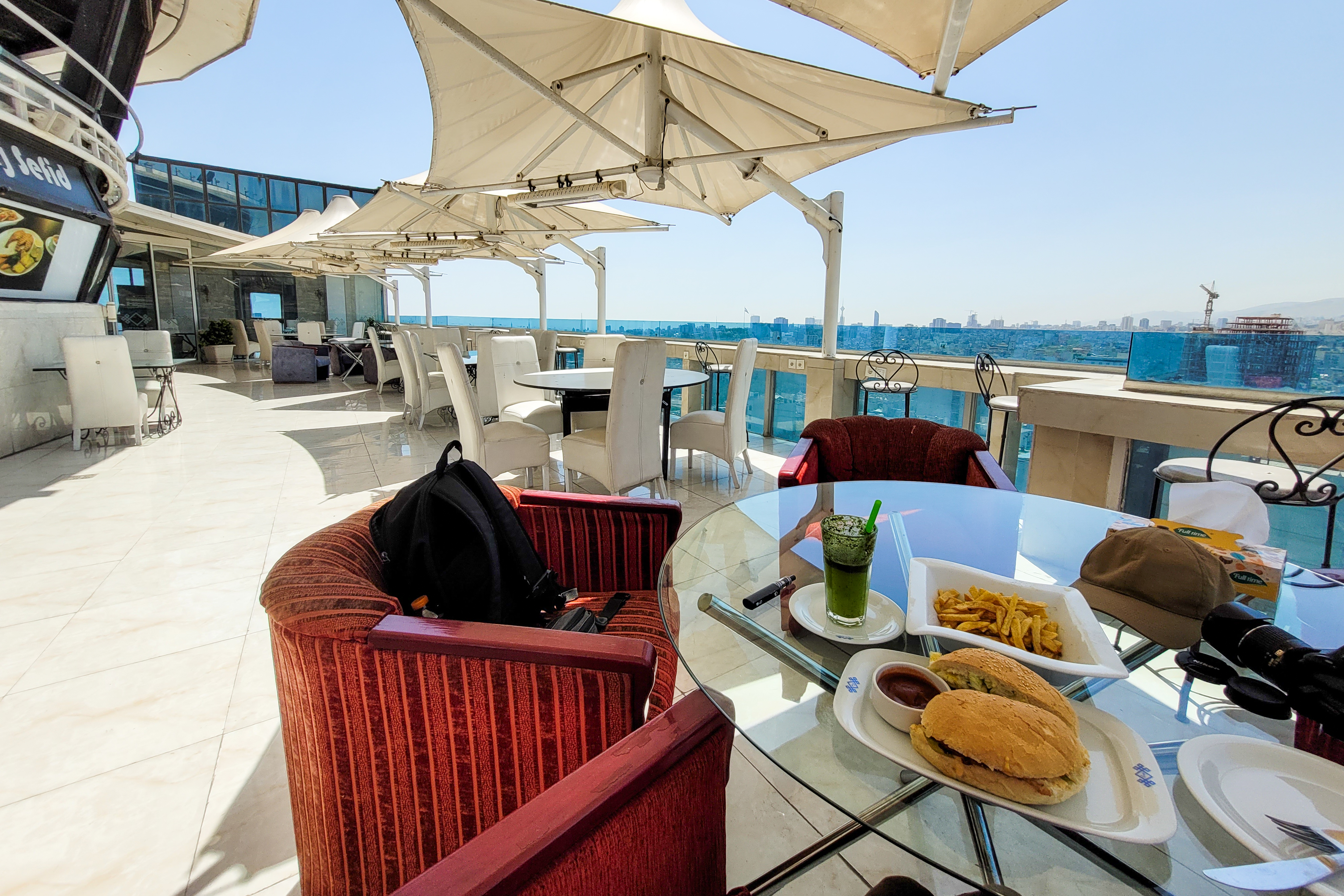
The restaurant.

The Borj-e Sefid (which translates to "White Tower" in English) is a high-rise building built along Pasdaran Ave, within which is contained a shopping center as well as many offices. The building has cemented Pasdaran's status as an upscale suburb of Tehran, raising the area's profile and spurring a series of developments in the surrounding areas. It is home to the revolving restaurant of Borj-e Sefid at the top floor of the building.

Also known as Borj Sefid located in the most prominent site. In 1994, Mr. Farhadkhani whose vision was to build the first high rise building in Tehran after the revolution came up with idea of Borj Sefid. Mr. Farhadkhani’s vision was made possible with the expertise of engineers, Dr. Joharzadeh, Mr. Saeed Sheibani, Mr. Firouz Sheibani, Mr. Tabatabaie, Mr. Hojati, and Mr. Saberi. Together, this group of engineers built a 22-storey high rise in one of the historic sites of Tehran.

Although the building is a center of business and commerce and is part of a trend towards increasing urbanity in the district (mainly witnessed along the district's northern edge near Farmanieh), the majority of the area's housing remains relatively suburban in nature, consisting mostly of mansions and townhomes or duplexes.

== See also ==
- List of revolving restaurants
- List of tallest towers
- List of tallest structures in Iran
