= Bank Saderat Iran =

Iranian banking and financial services corporation

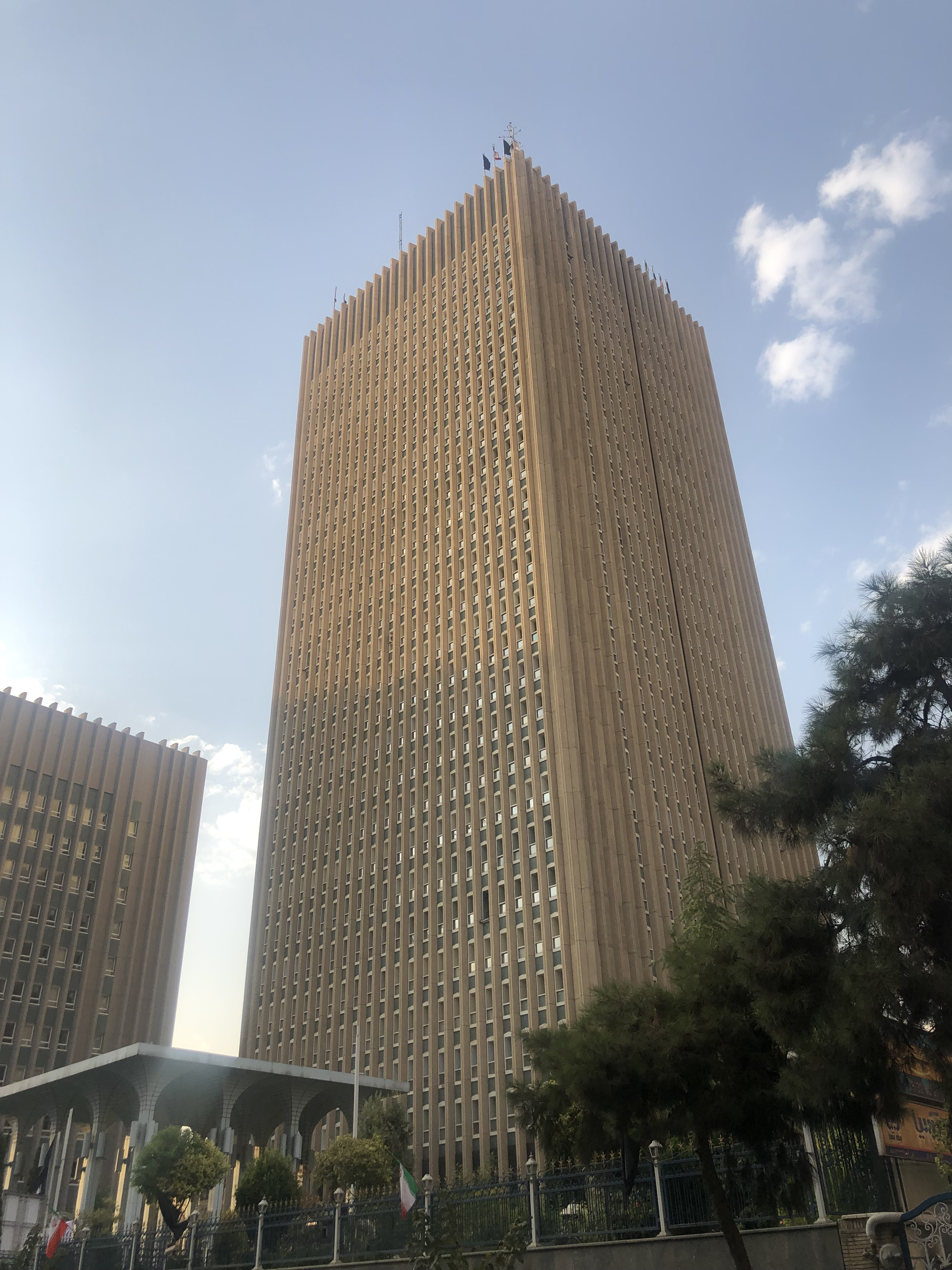
- Sepehr Tower, location of the bank's head office, in 2019
- Type: State-Owned
- Industry: Banking, Financial services
- Founded: 1952, Tehran
- Founder: Mohammad Ali Mofarrah
- Headquarters: Bank Saderat Tower, 43 Somayeh Avenue, Tehran, Iran
- Area served: Worldwide
- Key people: Ghorban Eskandari (CEO)
- Services: Credit cards, consumer banking, corporate banking, investment banking, mortgage loans, private banking, wealth management
- Revenue: ▲US$3,304 million (2013)
- Net income: ▲US$407 million (2013)
- Total assets: ▲US$105 billion (2021)
- Total equity: ▲US$6,017 million (2013)
- Number of employees: 24,369 (2021)
- Subsidiaries: Bank Saderat PLC (London), Bank Saderat Tashkent.
- Website: www.bsi.ir/en/Pages/HomePage.aspx

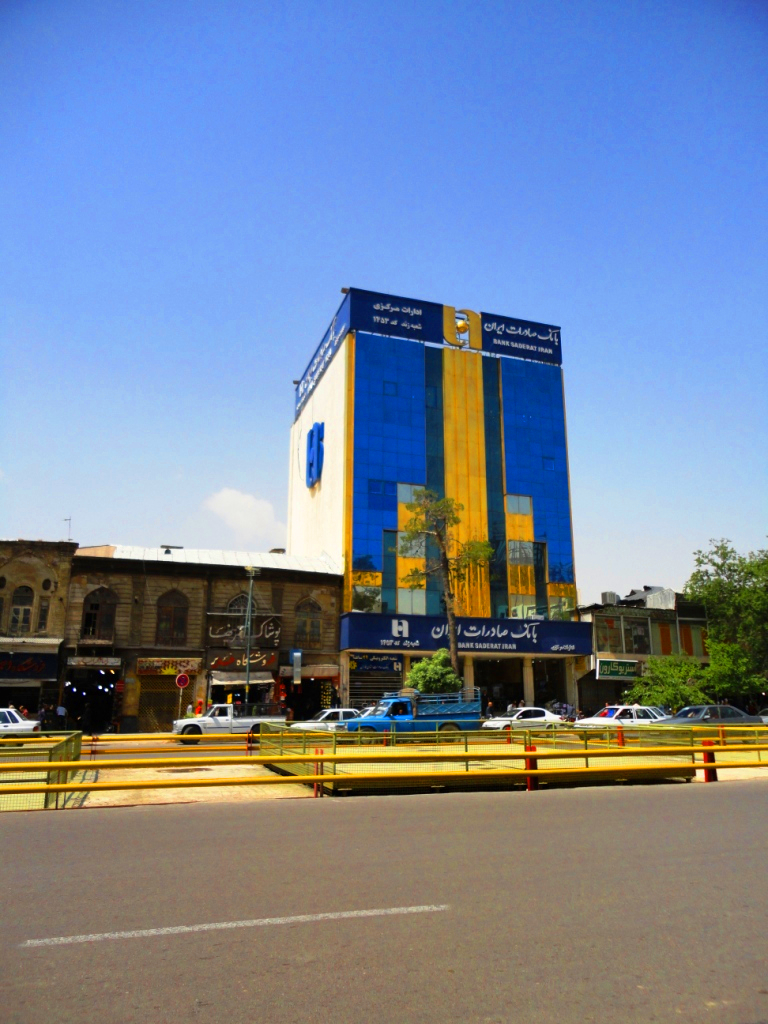
in shiraz

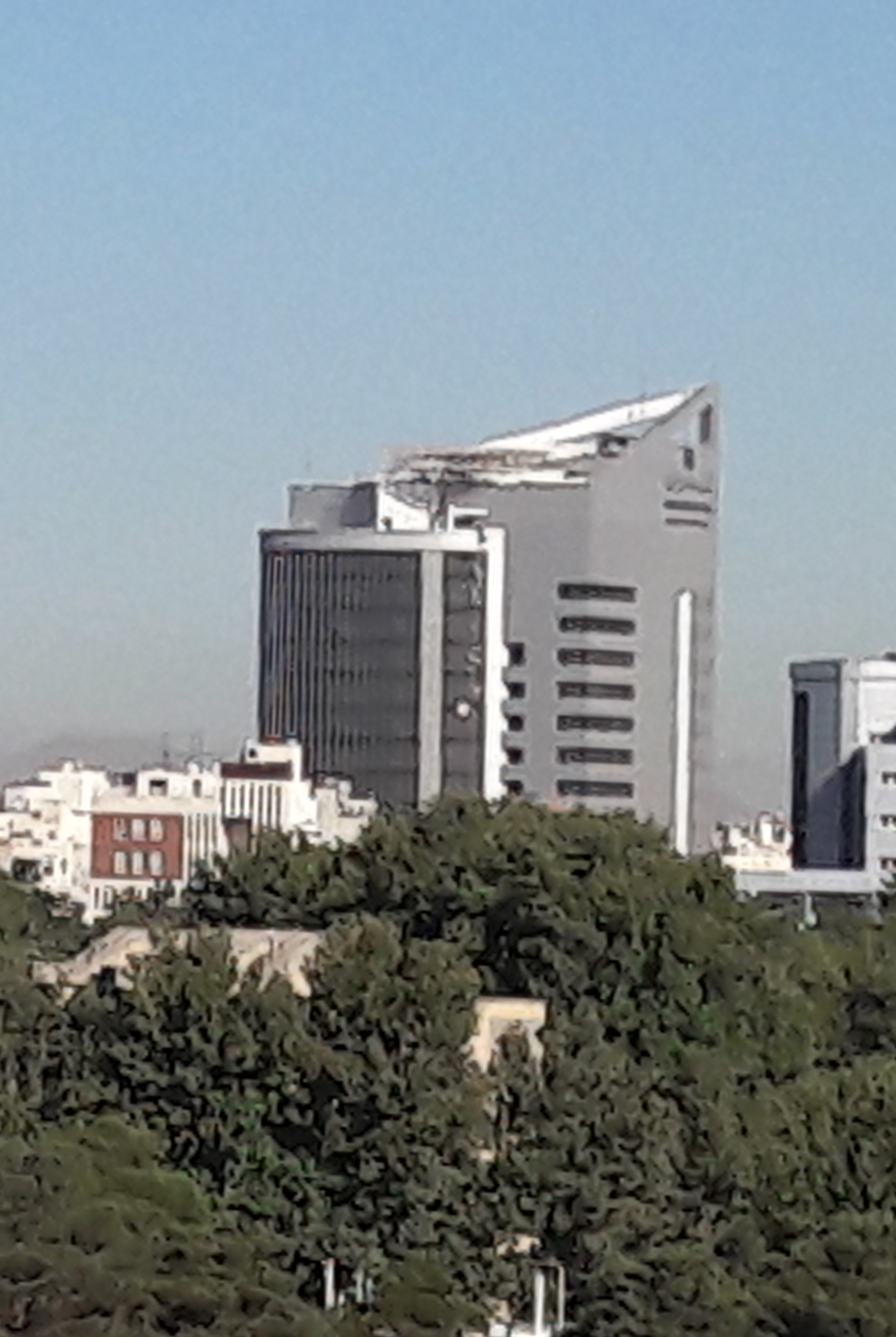
Bank Saderat Central Branch in Mashhad.

Bank Saderat Iran (BSI; Persian: بانک صادرات ایران, Bānk-e Sāderāt-e Irān, lit. "Export Bank of Iran") is an Iranian multinational banking and financial services company headquartered in Tehran, Iran. It is Iran's largest bank. It was founded in Tehran in 1952 by the prominent Mofarrah and Bolurfrushan (also spelled Bolourforoushan) families, represented in the first board by Mohammad Ali Mofarrah and Mohammad Bolurfrushan and commenced operation on 13 November 1952 with a board of three directors and 20 employees.

Bank Saderat Iran has around 3,500 offices in 12 countries and territories across Europe, the Middle East and Asia, and around 10 million customers. As of 30 June 2013, it had total assets of $59.110 billion. BSI has 28 international branches and services in 12 countries.

== History ==
=== Before 1979 ===
Bank Saderat Iran was founded on September 7, 1952, by the Bolurfrushan family, Mohammad Ali Mofrah, and several of his associates. The bank was initially established with a capital of 20 million Iranian rials in credit and 3,500 Iranian rials in loans. It was temporarily housed in an upper floor of a building overlooking the central branch of Bank Melli Iran in Takyeh Dowlat, Tehran. The bank was initially registered as "Bank Saderat va Ma'aden" (Bank of Exports and Mines) in the Tehran Companies Registration Office. The bank officially began operations on November 13, 1952, with the opening of its first branch, which employed 25 staff members. By the end of its first year, the bank's balance sheet showed total deposits of about 17.6 million rials, loans and credit facilities of about 67 million rials, total assets equivalent to 44.2 million rials, and a net profit of about 700,000 rials. This was achieved with only 10 million rials of its 20 million rial capital paid up. Initially, Mohammad Ali Mofrah invited Edward Joseph, a well-known banking expert at the time, to serve as the bank's CEO. Joseph led the bank for the first two years. In 1954, Mofrah was appointed CEO by the bank's board of directors. He remained in this position for 23 years until late 1977 when he resigned. In June 1978, Mofrah completely withdrew from the bank's board of directors. In 1963, the bank's name was changed to its current form, "Bank Saderat Iran" (Export Bank of Iran).

=== After 1979 ===
On 7 June 1979, after the Iranian Revolution, all Iranian private banks were nationalized, quite to the dismay of the founding families, and became state-owned. In 1980, branches and sub-branches of BSI in the Iranian provinces were turned into independent banks, named Bank Saderat Ostan (province). Today, BSI has 29 owned provincial bank subsidiaries and over 200 affiliated companies, supervised by Ghadir Investment Company. Iranian banks are administered on the basis of a law passed by the Islamic Revolution Council on 25 September 1979, and the provisions of its Articles of Association.

Bank Saderat is used by the Government of Iran to transfer money to what the U.S. has stated are designated terrorist organizations, including Hezbollah, Hamas, the Popular Front for the Liberation of Palestine-General Command and Palestinian Islamic Jihad, according to the U.S. Department of the Treasury.

Under the Iranian Transactions Regulations (31 CFR Part 560) in 2008, U.S. banks may process certain funds transfers involving an Iranian bank, such as transfers for authorized or exempt transactions and "U-turn" transactions. U-turn transactions allow U.S. banks to process payments involving Iran that begin and end with a non-Iranian foreign bank. Bank Saderat will not be able to participate in any transfers involving U.S. banks, effective from the date that the amendment to the regulations is filed with the U.S. Federal Register. By prohibiting U-turn and all other transactions with Bank Saderat, the bank is denied all direct and indirect access to the U.S. financial system.

Bank Saderat Iran currently conducts banking in the UAE, handling Iranian trade in and out of Dubai. The bank mainly deals in project financing, letters of credit and bank guarantees (demand guarantees), whereas other activities remains less important.

In February 2013, the European General Court in Luxembourg ruled to annul sanctions by the European Union (EU) against the bank, stating that the EU "is in breach of the obligation to state reasons and the obligation to disclose to the applicant ... the evidence adduced against it". The EU may appeal the decision. As of 2016, the EU asset freeze was still in effect.

In 2019 an EU court rejected BSI's appeal for £78.7m in damages the bank claimed to have suffered after the EU placed it on their sanctions list.

=== Logo ===
Bank Saderat Iran's logo has undergone several transformations since its inception:

- The original logo (1952-1979): Depicted a winged horse with the phrase "Bank Saderat Iran" above it. This design was proposed by Edward Joseph, the bank's first CEO, who based it on an antique ring he had purchased. The horse symbolized speed, endurance, and nobility, while its wings represented ambition and openness. The logo resembled the seal of Anushirvan, a Sassanid king.
- Post-Islamic Revolution logo (1979-1990): Following the 1979 Islamic Revolution, the logo was changed to feature a map of Iran showing provincial centers, reflecting the bank's regionalization.
- Current logo (1990-present): Introduced in 1990, the current logo depicts two hands and a coin. This design is still in use today.

The initial design of the current logo was commissioned by the bank's public relations department in 1990 and created by Esmail Kia-Moghaddam. Subsequently, at the bank's request, Morteza Momayez made modifications to the design. This collaboration later led to a dispute between the two designers over the authorship of the final work.

== Location of branches ==
- United Arab Emirates (Abu Dhabi - 3 branches and Dubai - 6 branches)
- Lebanon (Beirut - 4 branches, Sidon and Baalbek)
- Afghanistan (Kabul - 2 branches)
- Qatar (Doha - 2 branches)
- Bahrain (Manama)
- France (Paris)
- Germany (Hamburg and Frankfurt)
- Italy (Venice)
- Pakistan (Karachi)
- Oman (Muscat)
- Turkmenistan (Ashkhabad)
- United Kingdom (London)
- Uzbekistan (Tashkent)

== See also ==
- Banking in Iran
- Privatization in Iran
- Sanctions against Iran
- 2011 Iranian embezzlement scandal
