= Plasco Building =

Building in Tehran, Iran

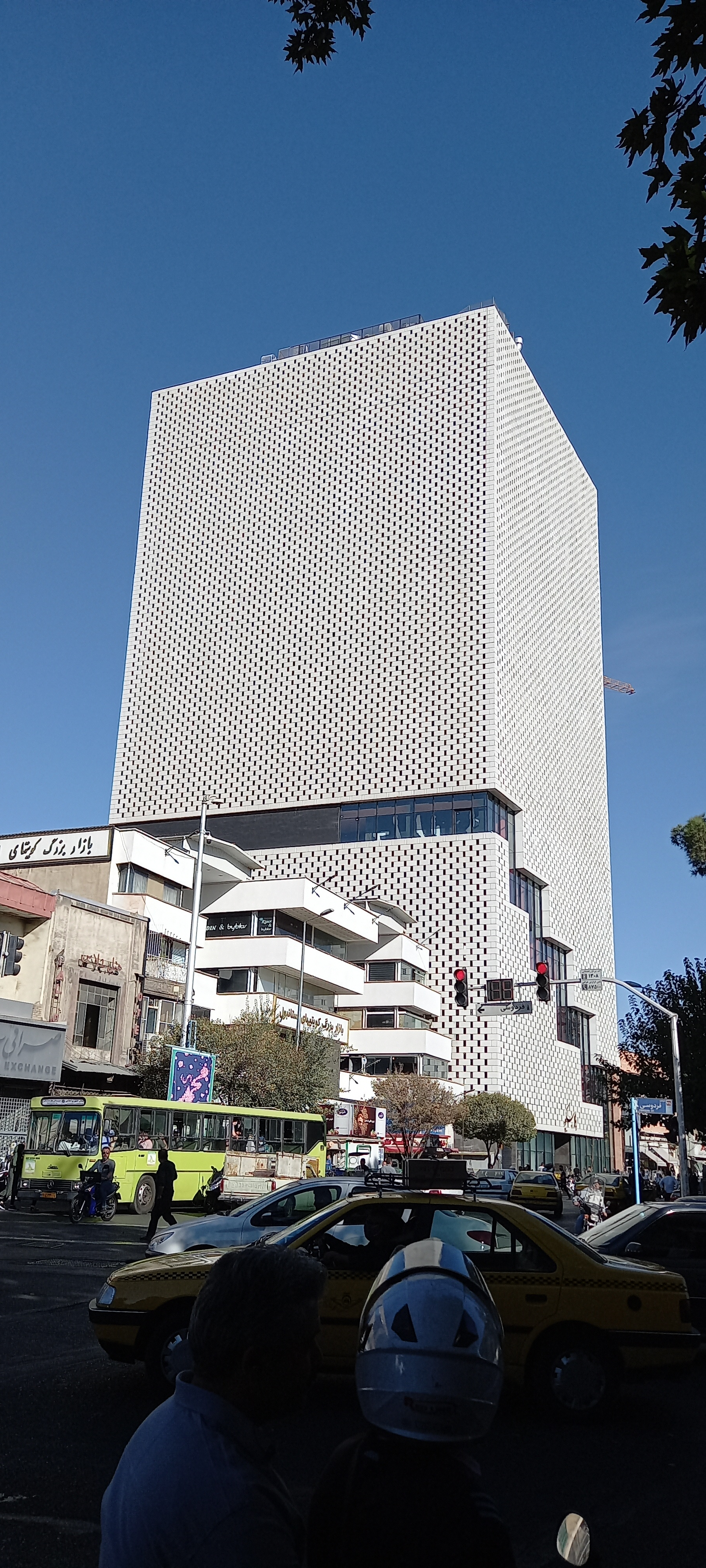
- Plasco Building in 2021
- Interactive map of the Plasco Building area

General information
- Type: Residential, light industrial, commercial, retail, restaurant
- Location: Tehran, Iran
- Coordinates: 35°41′41″N 51°25′15″E
- Construction started: 1960 (former building); 2018 (new building)
- Completed: 1962 (former building); 2021 (new building)
- Opened: 1962 (former building); 2021 (new building)
- Destroyed: 19 January 2017 (former building)

Height
- Roof: 42.0 m (138 ft)

Technical details
- Floor count: 17 (former building); 20 (new building)

The Plasco Building (Persian: ساختمان پلاسکو, romanized: Sâxtmân-e Plâskô) is a 20-story high-rise (5 floors below and 15 floors above ground) landmark building in Tehran, the capital city of Iran. It was built on the site of an earlier Plasco building, which at the time of its construction was the tallest building in Iran and was considered an iconic part of the Tehran skyline. The earlier building caught on fire and collapsed on 19 January 2017; construction on the new building began in 2018 and was completed in 2021.

== History ==
=== Former building ===
The Plasco building was built in 1962 by the prominent businessman Habib Elghanian, during a decade of rapid growth in Iran. The building was named after his plastics company. At the time of its construction it was the tallest building in Iran, and was considered an iconic landmark of the Tehran skyline, representing the drive for modernization under the rule of Shah Mohammad Reza Pahlavi.

After the 1979 Iranian Revolution, Habib Elghanian was executed by the new government, which seized the building and handed ownership of it to the state-controlled Islamic Revolution Mostazafan Foundation, tied to the Iranian Revolutionary Guards. The Mostazafan Foundation operated the building until its collapse.

At the time of the fire, the Plasco building was used as a residential and commercial building, with a major shopping center on its ground floor, a restaurant on its upper floor, and several clothing workshops.

=== Fire and collapse ===
2017 Plasco Building collapse
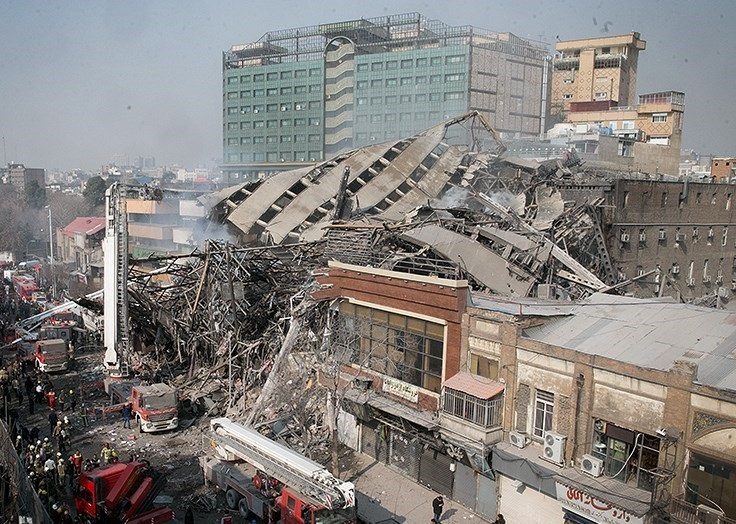
- Ruins of the building after the collapse
- Date: 19 January 2017
- Time: 11:20 local time (07:50 GMT)
- Location: Tehran, Iran
- Deaths: 20 (Official statistics; As of 26 January 2017, 22:33 local time)
- Injuries: 230 (Tehran Emergency Medical Service official statistics; As of 26 January 2017, 21:34 local time)
- Missing: 1 (Iran Police official estimate; announced 24 February 2017, 11:13 local time)

On 19 January 2017, a fire started on the ninth floor at around 07:50 local time (04:20 GMT). The building was occupied at the time by its residents, workers at the garment shops, and various tour groups that were being shown around the building. Ten fire brigades arrived to fight the blaze. The combined brigades had been trying to stop the fire for hours—while assuring that the building had been evacuated—when the building's north wall collapsed without warning, leading to the collapse of the rest of the building a few moments later. The collapse was captured on camera by Iran's state-run Press TV, which was filming the firefighting efforts.

Several firefighters were in the building when the north wall fell, some of whom safely escaped before the building completely collapsed. A number had been fighting the fire from elevated aerial platforms that toppled over during the collapse of the building. Mohammad Bagher Ghalibaf, the mayor of Tehran, said he believed that no other civilians were within the building when it collapsed, but eyewitnesses reported seeing residents crossing police lines to try to enter the building and recover their possessions.

=== Criticism on Ghalibaf ===
Tehran's municipality under Ghalibaf, was regarded by the media as responsible for the negligence of the building. They pointed out insufficient fire department funding, only one safety warning, slow crisis response and prioritizing debris removal over survivor safety.

=== Casualties among firefighters ===
Twenty firefighters have been reported to be killed. At least 70 others were injured by the collapse, with 23 taken to local hospitals having suffered severe injuries. The building primarily collapsed vertically, causing minimal damage to neighboring buildings.

The remains of 15 firefighters were recovered after nine days of relief and rescue operations, which were aided by the local military. Tens of thousands of Iranians, including firefighters and senior officials, attended the funeral ceremony held at Tehran's Grand Mosalla. They were laid to rest in part of the Behesht-e Zahra cemetery that is reserved for martyrs. Iranian Leader Ayatollah Khamenei eulogized the firefighters in a message, calling them heroes and shaheeds.

Following the building's collapse, its owner, the Mostazafan Foundation, declined to make a public statement. Four days later, on 23 January 2017 the foundation apologized for their role in the possible failure in building's safety, but added that they are not a member of building's board who is responsible for the building's affairs. Mohammad Saeedikia, CEO of Mostazafan Foundation also said that the organization is ready to rebuild the Plasco in two years.

In April 2017 the government issued a report on the collapse of the building which stated that the Mostazafan Foundation had ignored warnings given by the authorities. The report also stated that government ministries had failed to enforce 22 national building regulations.

=== New building ===
Designed by Iranian architectural firm KRDS (Kourosh Rafiey Design Studio), the construction of the new building lasted from 2018 to 2021 and was finally opened in mid-2021 under the name Plasco 1400. The new Plasco building has 20 floors with 5 floors below and 15 floors above ground.

== Gallery ==
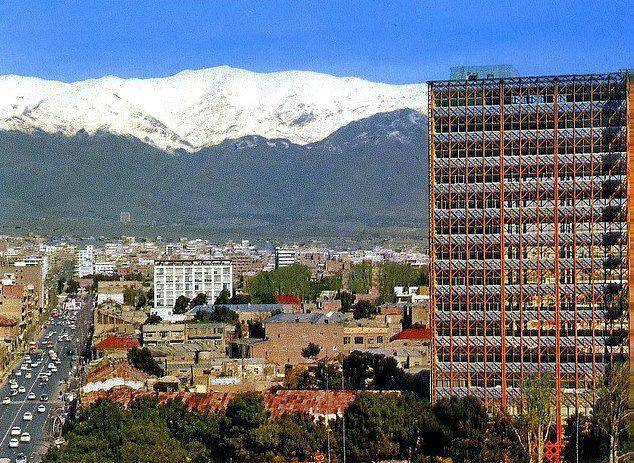
Newly built tower in the 1960s

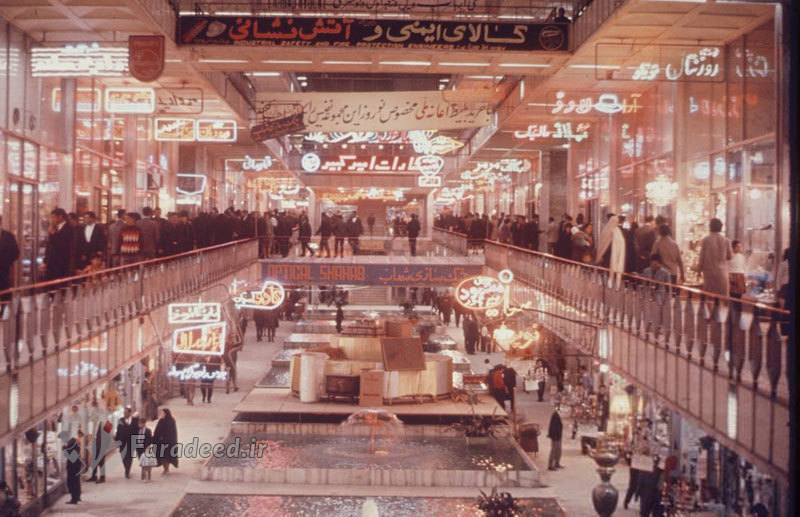
Interior of the building in the 1970s

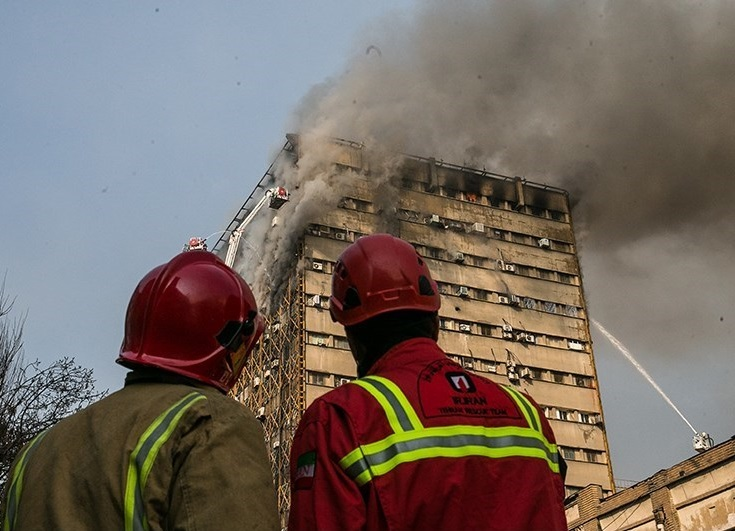
Building on fire on 19 January 2017

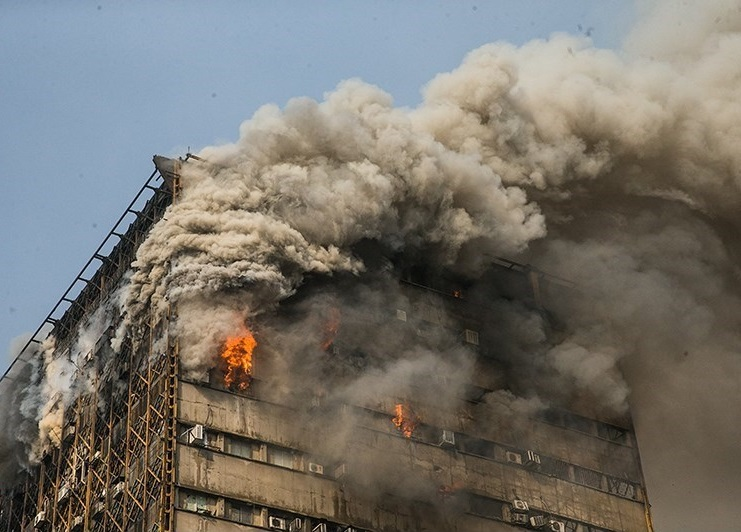
Plasco fire

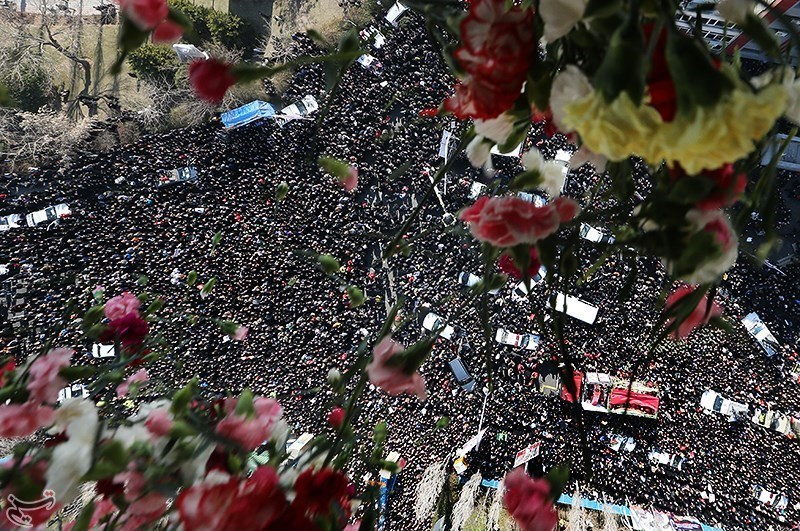
Plasco victims funeral in Tehran 19

== See also ==
- List of tallest buildings in Tehran
