= Milad Hospital =

Milad Hospital بیمارستان میلاد
- Iranian Social Security Organization

Geography
- Location: Tehran, Tehran, Iran
- Coordinates: 35°44′44″N 51°22′52″E

Organisation
- Care system: Social Security Insurance
- Type: Specialist

Services
- Standards: ISO 9001: 2000, ISO 14001:2004
- Emergency department: Yes
- Beds: 1000

History
- Founded: 2001

Links
- Website: http://www.miladhospital.com/
- Lists: Hospitals in Iran

Milad Hospital (Persian: بیمارستان میلاد) is one of the largest specialized and subspecialized hospitals in Iran. This hospital is a complementary health service provider in Iran's Social Security organization (SSO) chain of hospitals. Milad hospital currently employs more than 5600 specialists and subspecialists of various fields.

== History ==
The construction of hospital was started in 1977 but was suspended in 1979 due to the revolution and Iran–Iraq War. The project was later restarted in 1988 with some changes in the original design. It began serving patients in 2001. This 12 floors structure is part of the Milad complex, which also includes Milad Tower and Milad hotel.

== Facilities ==
Milad hospital has 1000 licensed beds, 24 surgery rooms, 20 pre-surgery and 20 post-surgery care beds. Milad hospital also provides Pediatric Intensive Care Unit (PICU) and Neonatal intensive care unit (NICU) units, in addition to CCU, dentistry and various labs.

The hospital also includes general service sections for patients and visitors, including 430 seat and 190 seat conference centers, two 120 seat classrooms, pharmacy, child day care and restaurant.

The building consists of three wings, and one central tower connecting these three wings. This complex is located next to Milad Tower on the junction of Hemmat and Chamran Expressways.

== Gallery ==
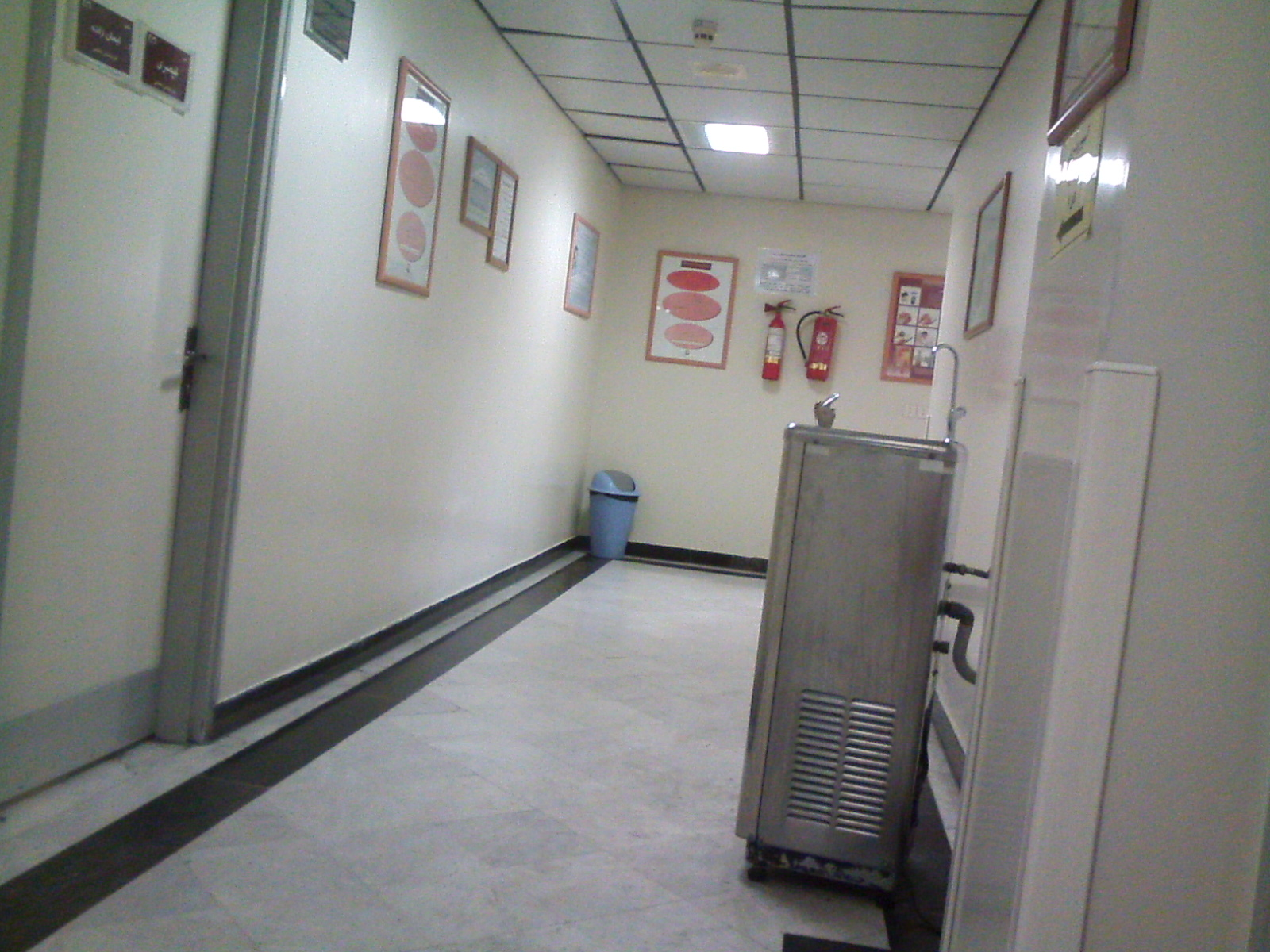
Internal view

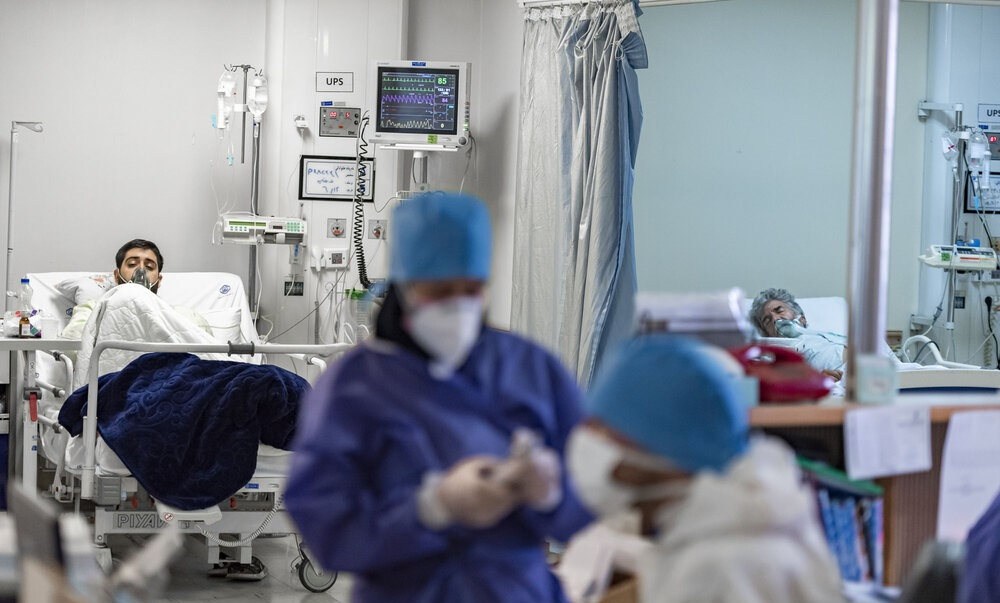
Milad Hospital during the COVID-19 pandemic in Iran (2020)
