= Chamran Grand Hotel =

Hotel in Shiraz, Iran

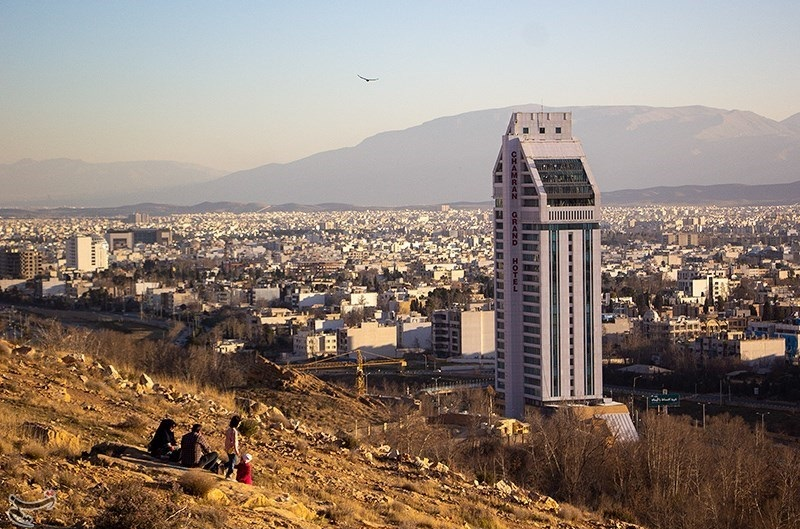
- Interactive map of the Chamran Grand Hotel area

General information
- Location: Shiraz, Iran

Height
- Height: 109 m (358 ft)

Technical details
- Floor count: 30
- Floor area: 99,500 m^{2} (1,071,000 sq ft)

Design and construction
- Architect: M.H Shafaatian
- Developer: Chamran Com.

Other information
- Number of rooms: 230
- Number of suites: 20
- Number of restaurants: 3

Chamran Grand Hotel is a five star hotel located in Chamran Boulevard surrounded by the Ghasrodasht gardens in Shiraz, Iran. The structure has a height of 109 meters, and is the highest hotel tower in Iran. The hotel has 230 rooms and 20 suites. Construction of the hotel began in 2008 and it was officially opened in April 2011.

== See also ==
- List of tallest structures in Iran
