= Bank Markazi Tower =

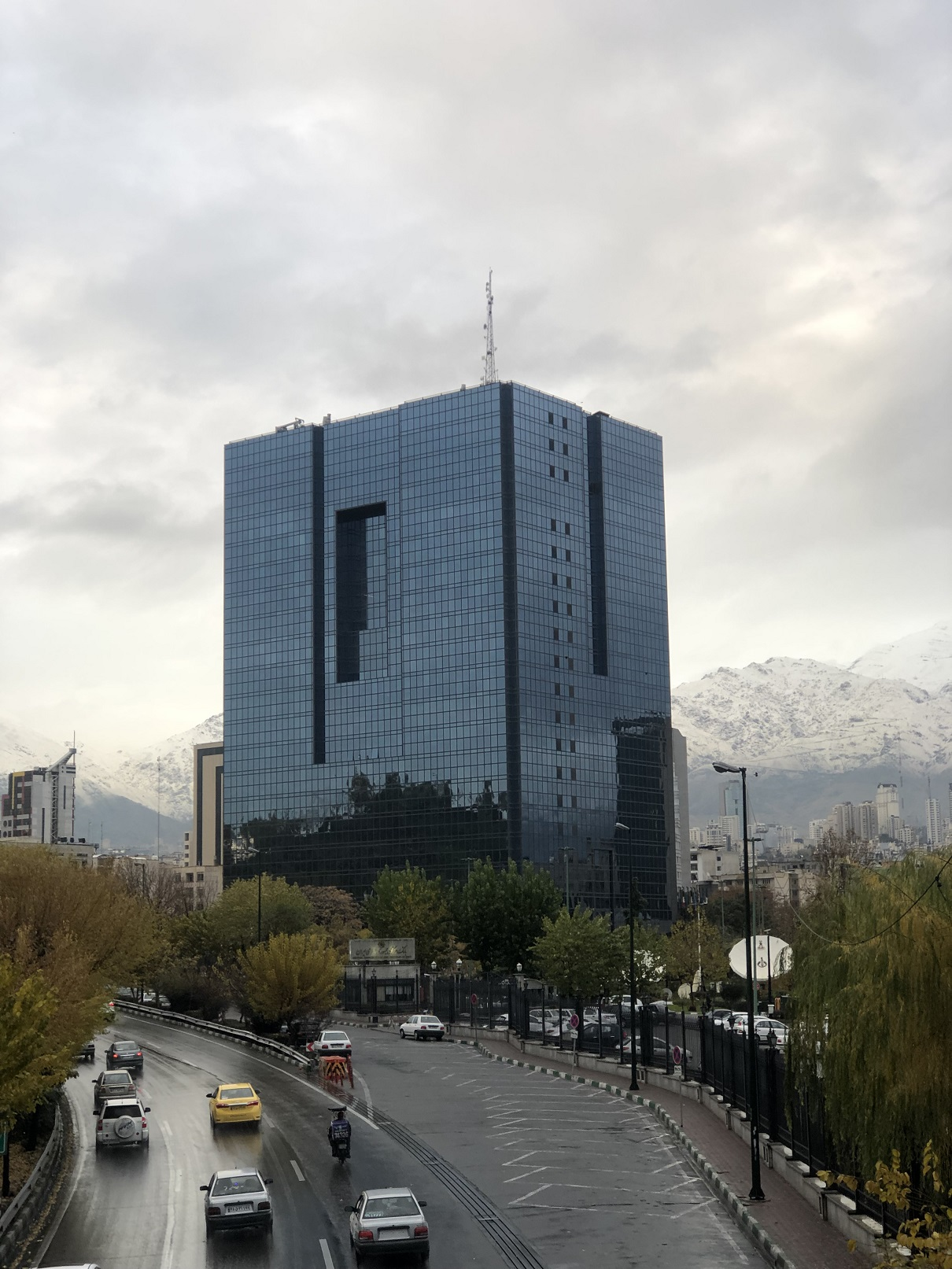

- Location in Tehran Location in Iran

General information
- Status: Completed
- Type: Office building
- Architectural style: Postmodernism
- Location: No. 198, Mirdamad Boulevard, Tehran, Iran
- Coordinates: 35°45′29″N 51°26′06″E
- Opened: 1999
- Owner: Central Bank of Iran

Height
- Roof: 71.62 m

Technical details
- Material: Glass
- Floor count: 20

The Bank Markazi Tower (Persian: برج بانک مرکزی) is a high-rise building located in Davoodiyeh neighborhood of Tehran, between Shahid Haghani Expressway and Mirdamad Boulevard. Its facade is made of dark blue reflective glass, acting as sun protection and preventing free sight into the building. The building belongs to the Central Bank of Iran.

== See also ==
- List of tallest buildings in Tehran
