= Gol Dasteh, Kerman =

Gol Dasteh گلدسته
- Village
- Location within Iran
- Coordinates: 28°08′42″N 57°31′34″E
- Country: Iran
- Province: Kerman
- County: Faryab
- Bakhsh: Central
- Rural District: Mehruiyeh

Population (2006)
  - Total: 498
- Time zone: UTC+3:30 (IRST)
  - Summer (DST): UTC+4:30 (IRDT)

Gol Dasteh (Persian: گلدسته) meaning "flower hand" in Farsi is a village in Mehruiyeh Rural District, in the Central District of Faryab County, Kerman Province, Iran. At the 2006 census, its population was 498, in 94 families.
