= Shahran Tower =

- Borj-e Shahrān
- Shahran Tower in the middle of the picture

- Location within Iran
- Alternative names: Shahran Tower

General information
- Status: Completed
- Type: Residential
- Location: Tabriz, Iran
- Coordinates: 38.0371°N 46.3611°E
- Completed: 2013

Height
- Height: 100 m

Shahran Tower (Persian: برج شهران, Borj-e Shahrān) is the tallest residential tower in Iranian Azerbaijan. It is located in Tabriz, Iran.

== See also ==
- List of tallest buildings in Iran
