= World Trade Center Tabriz =

Skyscraper in Tabriz, Iran

Tabriz World Trade Center
- مرکز تجارت جهانی تبریز

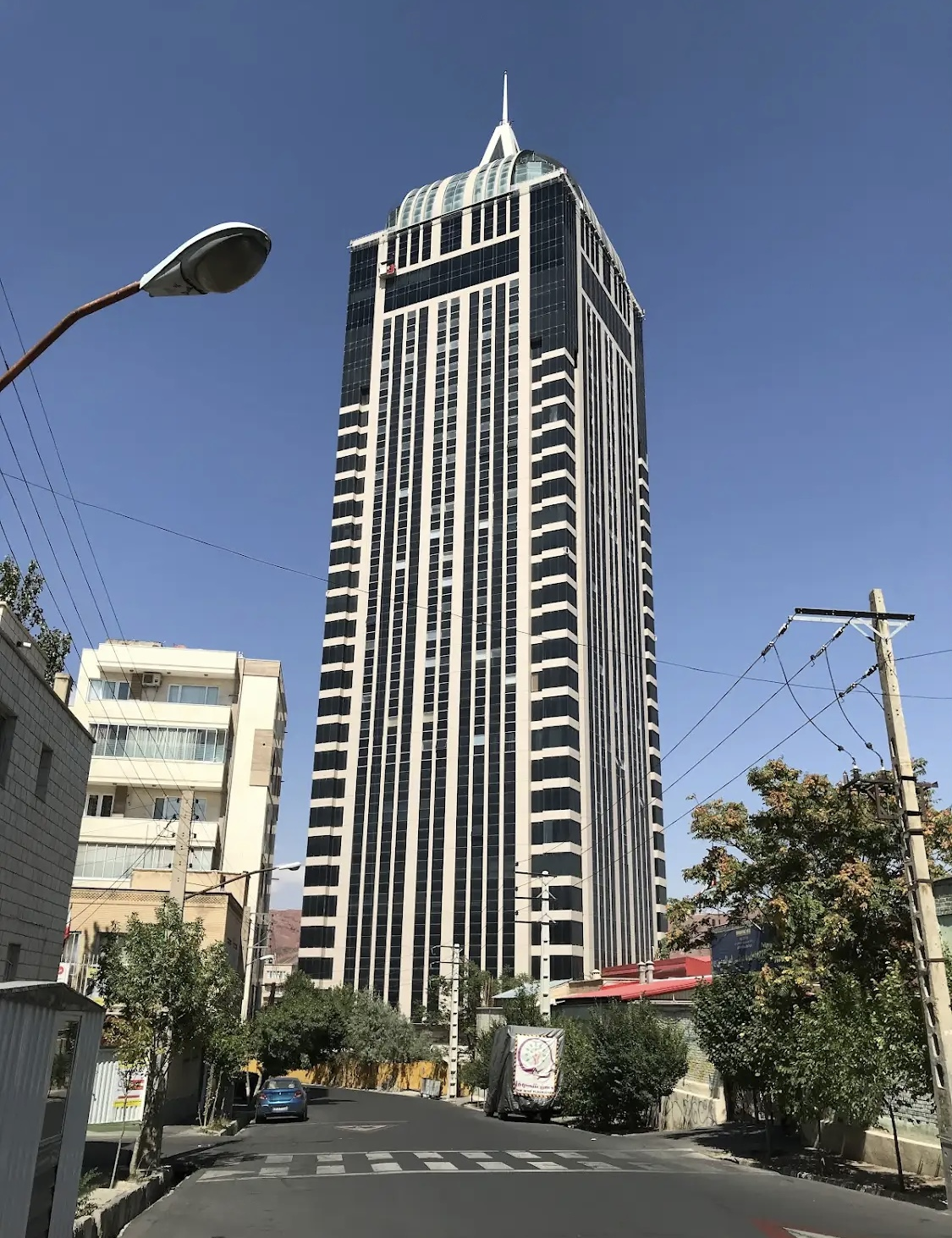

- Location within Iran
- Alternative names: Tabriz World Trade Tower

General information
- Status: Completed
- Type: Mixed-use
- Location: Tabriz, Iran
- Coordinates: 38.0668°N 46.3648°E
- Construction started: 2007
- Opening: 2019

Height
- Architectural: 192 m (630 ft)
- Roof: 152 m (499 ft)

Technical details
- Floor count: 37

Tabriz World Trade Center (Persian: مرکز تجارت جهانی تبریز) is a 37-story skyscraper located in Tabriz, East Azerbaijan Province. Standing at a height of 192 m (630 ft), it is the tallest building in Tabriz and currently the second-tallest building in Iran, surpassed only by the 210-meter Fereshteh Pasargad Hotel in Tehran.

The Tabriz World Trade Center is an expansive mixed-use development centered around a 37-story administrative tower with 41,000 square meters of infrastructure. Reaching a structural height of 152 m (499 ft), the tower is topped by a four-story, 35 m (115 ft) dome designated for scientific and tourism purposes, which, along with a telecommunications antenna, brings its total architectural height to 192 m (630 ft). The broader project encompasses approximately 150,000 square meters of commercial and leisure space, including a large-scale shopping center, entertainment complexes, and dedicated tourism facilities.

== See also ==
- List of tallest buildings in Iran
- List of World Trade Centers
