= Tehran International Tower =

Residential skyscraper in Tehran, Iran

- Tehran International Tower in July 2024

- Location within Iran

General information
- Status: Completed
- Type: Residential
- Location: Tehran, Iran
- Coordinates: 35.7426808°N 51.3991446°E
- Construction started: 1996
- Completed: 2005
- Opening: 2007

Height
- Roof: 162 m (531 ft)

Technical details
- Floor count: 56
- Floor area: 220,000 m^{2} (2,400,000 sq ft)

Design and construction
- Developer: International Construction Development Co.
- Structural engineer: Setec Batiment
- Main contractor: Ati Sazan Persia

Website
- tehrantower.ir

Tehran International Tower (Persian: برج بین المللی تهران), also known as the Tehran Tower, is a 56-story residential skyscraper located in Tehran, Iran. Standing at 162 m (531 ft) tall, it is the tallest residential building in Iran and the fourth-tallest building in the country.

Located in the Yusef Abad district, the tower was completed in 2007 and served as the tallest building in Iran until 2019. It remains a landmark of the Tehran skyline, particularly noted for its structural scale and residential capacity.

== Specifications ==
Constructed with a reinforced concrete core and slabs, the Tehran International Tower features a structural design composed of three wings extending at 120-degree angles from a central axis. The building's architecture utilizes a system of perpendicular main walls and subsidiary walls designed to meet rigorous safety and seismic standards, further reinforced by the implementation of extensive retaining walls. The facility is managed by an integrated Intelligent Building Management System (IBMS), which centralizes the tower's internal computer networks, energy consumption, and network controls. Security and safety operations are further supported by a comprehensive CCTV array, automated fire suppression systems, and dedicated traffic control mechanisms.

The Tehran International Tower comprises three distinct wings: Wing A (North), Wing B (East), and Wing C (West). Each story within the structure maintains a consistent floor-to-ceiling height of 3 meters (9.8 ft).

== Gallery ==
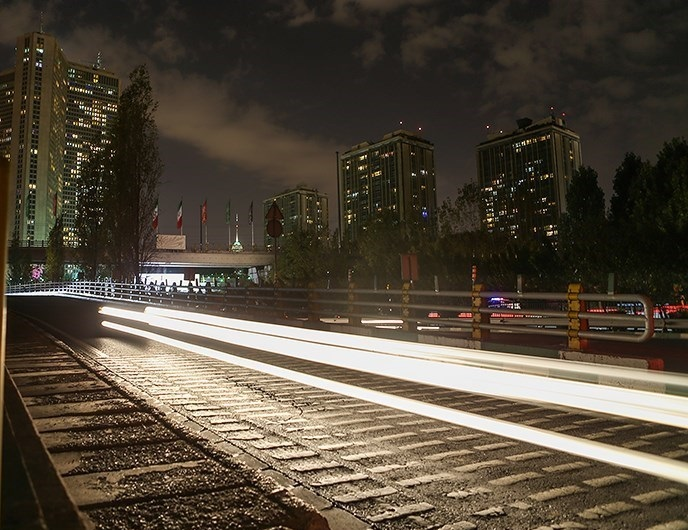
Tehran International Tower (left) and A.S.P. Towers (right) at night

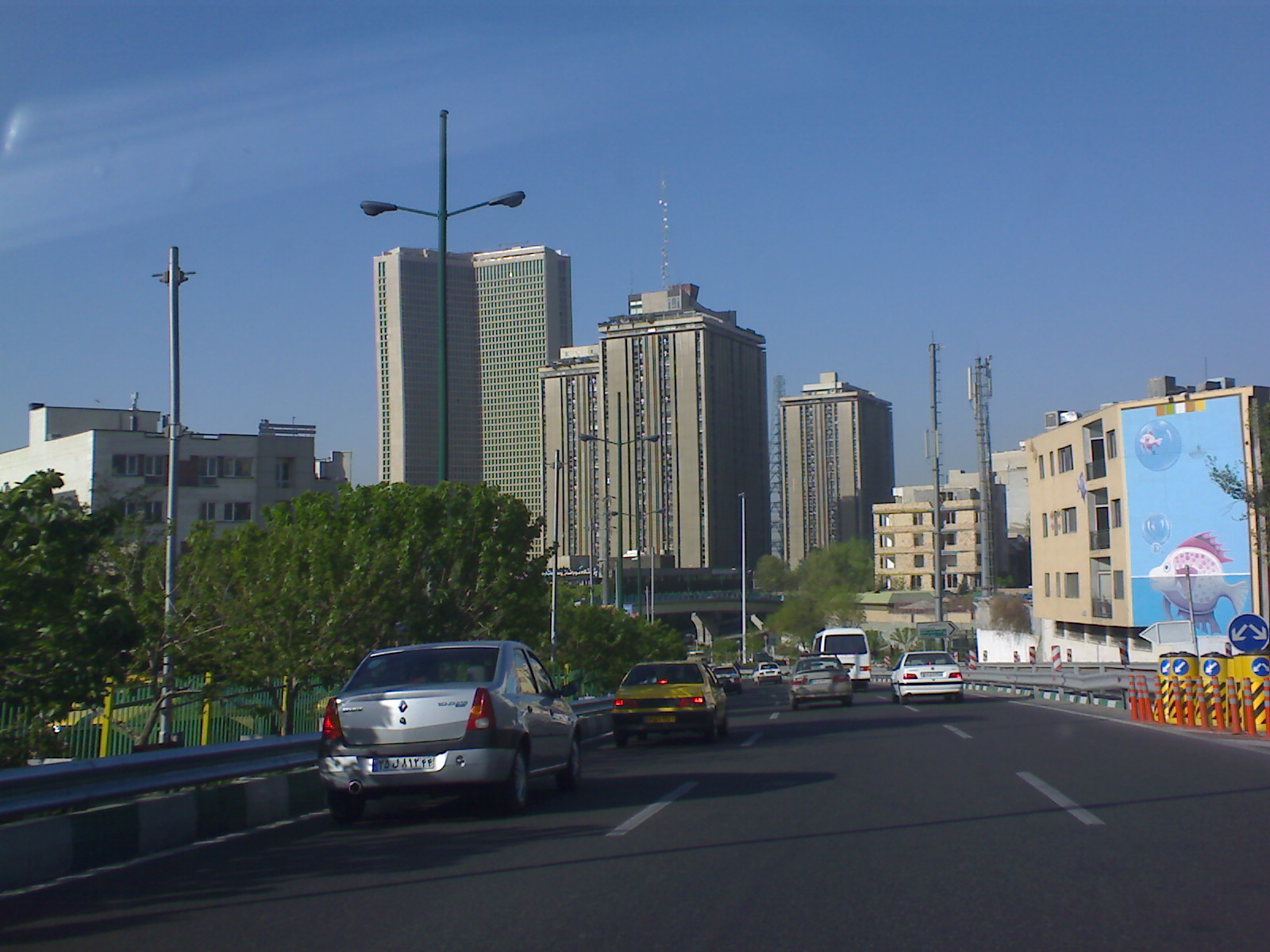
Skyline of Tehran, with the Tehran International Tower visible in the background

Tehran International Tower in 2011

== See also ==
- List of tallest buildings in Tehran
