= Shiraz World Trade Center =

World Trade Center Shiraz
- Interactive map of the World Trade Center Shiraz area

General information
- Status: Under construction
- Type: Mixed
- Location: Shiraz, Iran
- Coordinates: 29°37′48″N 52°30′30″E
- Construction started: 2010
- Estimated completion: 2021
- Cost: 3 billion USD
- Owner: Mohammad Hossein Mohammadpour

Height
- Antenna spire: 200 m (656 ft)

Technical details
- Floor count: 47
- Floor area: 10,000 m^{2} (110,000 sq ft)

The World Trade Center Shiraz is a proposed mixed-use development located in Shiraz, Fars province, Iran. The project is planned to include commercial, office, residential, and hospitality facilities. According to the original project proposal, the development consists of a 47-storey tower with a planned architectural height of approximately 200 m (656 ft). The project was designed by architect Amirabbas Aboutalebi.

== History ==
The World Trade Center Shiraz project was announced as a large-scale mixed-use development intended to become one of the tallest buildings in Shiraz. Construction reportedly began in 2010. The development was planned to combine retail, office, residential, and hospitality spaces within a single complex. The architectural design was prepared by Amirabbas Aboutalebi.

As of 2025, publicly available information about the project's construction progress remains limited, and independent secondary sources have provided little recent coverage of its current status.
