= Sepehr Tower =

Building in Tehran, Iran

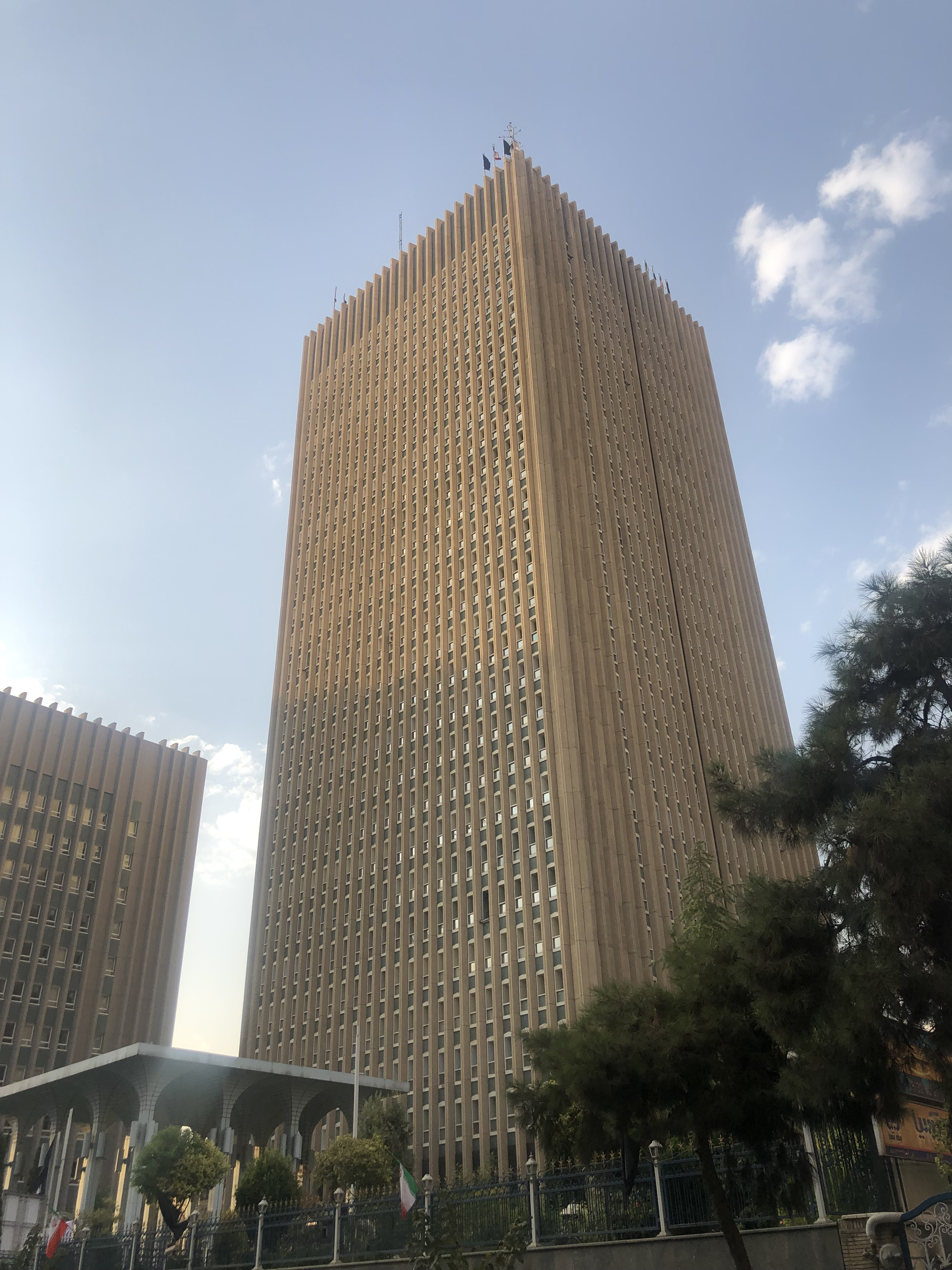
- Sepehr Tower was the tallest tower at the time of built in Iran

- Location within Iran

General information
- Status: Completed
- Type: Office building
- Location: Tehran, Iran
- Coordinates: 35°42′22″N 51°25′38″E

Height
- Roof: 115.0 m (377 ft)

Technical details
- Floor count: 33
- Floor area: 55,000 m^{2} (590,000 sq ft)

Sepehr Tower (Persian: برج سپهر, romanized: Borj-e Sepehr) is a 115 metre high building in Tehran, Iran. With 33 floors, Sepehr Tower was Tehran's tallest building at the time of its completion. It is located at Somayyeh St. close to the junction of Taleghani Ave and Dr. Mofatteh Street.

The construction of the Tower was delayed for years due to the 1979 Iranian Revolution. It now houses the head offices of Saderat Bank of Iran.
