= Milad Tower =

Multi-purpose tower in Tehran

- برج میلاد

- The Milad Tower in 2023

General information
- Type: Telecommunication, commercial, restaurant, observation
- Location: Tehran, Iran
- Coordinates: 35°44′41″N 51°22′31″E
- Construction started: 1997
- Completed: 2007
- Opening: 7 October 2008
- Cost: 266 billion tomans
- Owner: Municipality of Tehran
- Operator: Boland Payeh Co.

Height
- Height: 435 meters
- Antenna spire: 435.0 m (1,427 ft)
- Roof: 315.0 m (1,033 ft)
- Top floor: 312.0 m (1,024 ft)

Technical details
- Floor count: 12
- Floor area: 154,000 m^{2} (1,660,000 sq ft)
- Lifts/elevators: 6

Design and construction
- Architect: Mohammad Reza Hafezi
- Main contractor: Boland Payeh Co.

Website
- miladtower.tehran.ir

The Milad Tower (Persian: برج میلاد, romanized: Borj-e Milād, lit. 'Birth Tower') is a multi-purpose tower in Tehran, Iran. It is the sixth-tallest tower and the world's first telecommunication tower in terms of the usage area of the top structure and the tallest tower in Iran and the 24th-tallest freestanding structure in the world. The construction of the tower took about 11 years and 7 months.

It is located between Shahrak-e Gharb and the district of Gisha, standing at 435 meters from the base to the tip of the antenna. The head consists of a large pod with 12 floors, the roof of which is at 315 meters.

The tower is a part of the International Trade and Convention Center of Tehran, which also includes a five-star hotel, a convention center, a world trade center, and an IT park.

It is the regular host site of the Fajr International Film Festival, Iran's most prominent film festival.

== History ==
=== Background ===
The Milad Tower was part of the Shahestan Pahlavi project, a vast development for a new government and commercial centre for Tehran, that was designed in the 1970s but never materialised, except for the tower. After an international competition, the project was awarded to the Llewelyn Davies Company and construction was inaugurated on 19 August 1975, with Shah Mohammad Reza Pahlavi and Mayor of Tehran, Gholamreza Nikpey burying a commemorative gold plaque. There is also another background of building this tower, since the construction of the tower was started after the 1979 revolution. The new government of Iran wanted to create a new symbol for Tehran to replace the Azadi Tower that was a symbol of the Pahlavi era.

== Opening ==
After 11 years since the beginning of construction, on 7 October 2008, Milad Tower was inaugurated in the presence of representatives of the Islamic Consultative Assembly, members of the Islamic City Council of Tehran, and Mohammad Bagher Ghalibaf, the mayor of Tehran, with the slogan "The sky is near." The ceremony was covered by more than 250 Iranian and foreign journalists.

=== Construction ===
The construction of the tower was commenced in 1997. In 2001, at the suggestion of the Islamic Council of Tehran, on the occasion of the 100th birthday of Ruhollah Khomeini, the founder of the Islamic Republic of Iran, it was renamed Milad Tower. The construction of this tower lasted for 11 years. In the first 8 years, only 40% of the tower was completed, but with the acceleration of the project by Mohammad Bagher Ghalibaf, the mayor of Tehran, the next 60% was built in 30 months. Upon completion of its construction in the mid 2000s, the Milad Tower was considered the fourth-tallest freestanding telecommunication tower in the world. The tower's construction was finished in 2007, 11 years after the beginning of construction. On 7 October 2008, Milad Tower was opened with the slogan "Heaven is near" in the presence of representatives of the Islamic Council, members of the Islamic Council of Tehran and Mohammad Bagher Ghalibaf, the mayor of Tehran. This ceremony was covered by more than 250 Iranian and foreign journalists. Numerous conflicts on the history of the tower still prevail, partly because sections of the tower were open to visitors once the elevators started operating during construction and the tower was still far from finished.

The design of the project was headed by Iranian architect Mohammad Reza Hafezi. The general contractor was the company of Boland Payeh, and the main client and investor was the company of Yadman Sazeh, a representative of the Municipality of Tehran.

== Structure and features ==
Outline of the Milad Tower

The Milad Tower among the world's seven tallest towers

Milad Tower is 435 meters (1,427 ft) tall and is the tallest tower in Iran, and the sixth-tallest telecommunication tower in the world. It consists of five main parts, including the foundation, transition (lobby) structure, shaft, head structure and the antenna mast.

The lobby structure consists of six floors. The first three floors consist of 63 trade units, 11 food courts, a cafeteria, and a commercial products exhibition which is supposed to be about 260 square metres (2,800 sq ft). The first and second underground floors consist of installing sections and a data center. The ground floor is dedicated to the entrance and the gatehouse.

Inside one of the elevators of the Milad Tower

The shaft is a concrete structure about 315 metres (1,033 ft) high from the ground floor. Six elevators in three different sides of the shaft are used to transfer the visitors to the head of the tower at the speed of 7 metres per second (0.0070 km/s), besides an emergency staircase at the fourth side.

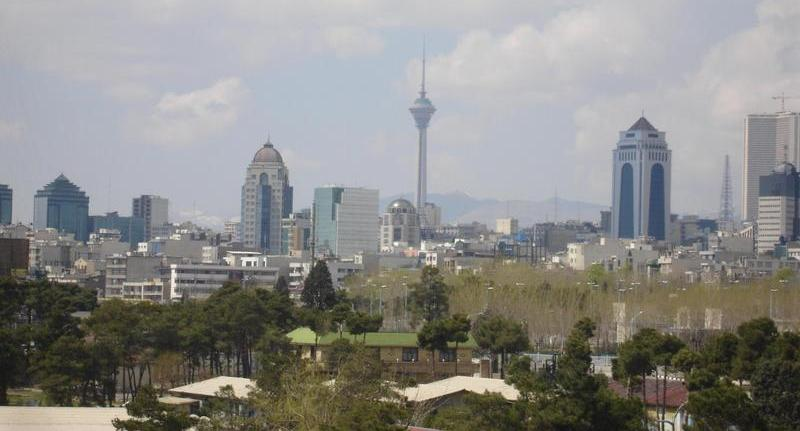
Milad Tower in May 2007

The head of the tower is a steel structure weighing about 25,000 tonnes and consisting of 12 floors. The top floors of the tower include a public art gallery, a cafeteria, a revolving restaurant, a VIP restaurant, telecommunication floors, mechanical floors, fire-immune areas built as a refuge zone, a closed observation deck, an open observation deck, and a sky dome.

The four-stage antenna mast is about 120 metres (390 ft) high. The lower floor of the mast is for the adjustment of public users' telecommunication antennas, and the three upper floors are dedicated to the antenna of the Islamic Republic of Iran Broadcasting.

The complex also features a parking area of about 27,000 square metres (290,000 sq ft), a large computer and telecommunications unit, a cultural and scientific unit, a commercial transaction center, a temporary showroom for exhibiting products, a specialized library, an exhibition hall, and an administrative unit.

The Milad Tower has an octagonal base, a reference to traditional Iranian architecture.

=== Selection of the location ===
To select the best location for the construction of the tower, 21 locations in Tehran were carefully examined from all angles, of which 4 locations (Abbas Abad, Lavizan, Yousef Abad, and Nasr area) were selected. After final studies, Gisha (Nasr) district was selected for the construction of the Milad Tower in late 1993 to be a symbol of the city and a tourist attraction.

==== Related highways ====
The four highways leading to Milad Tower are:

1- "Shahid Hemmat Highway" to the north of the tower

2- "Sheikh Fadlallah Nouri Highway" to the west of the tower

3- "Shahid Hakim Highway" to the south of the tower

4- "Shahid Chamran Highway" to the east of the tower

== Gallery ==
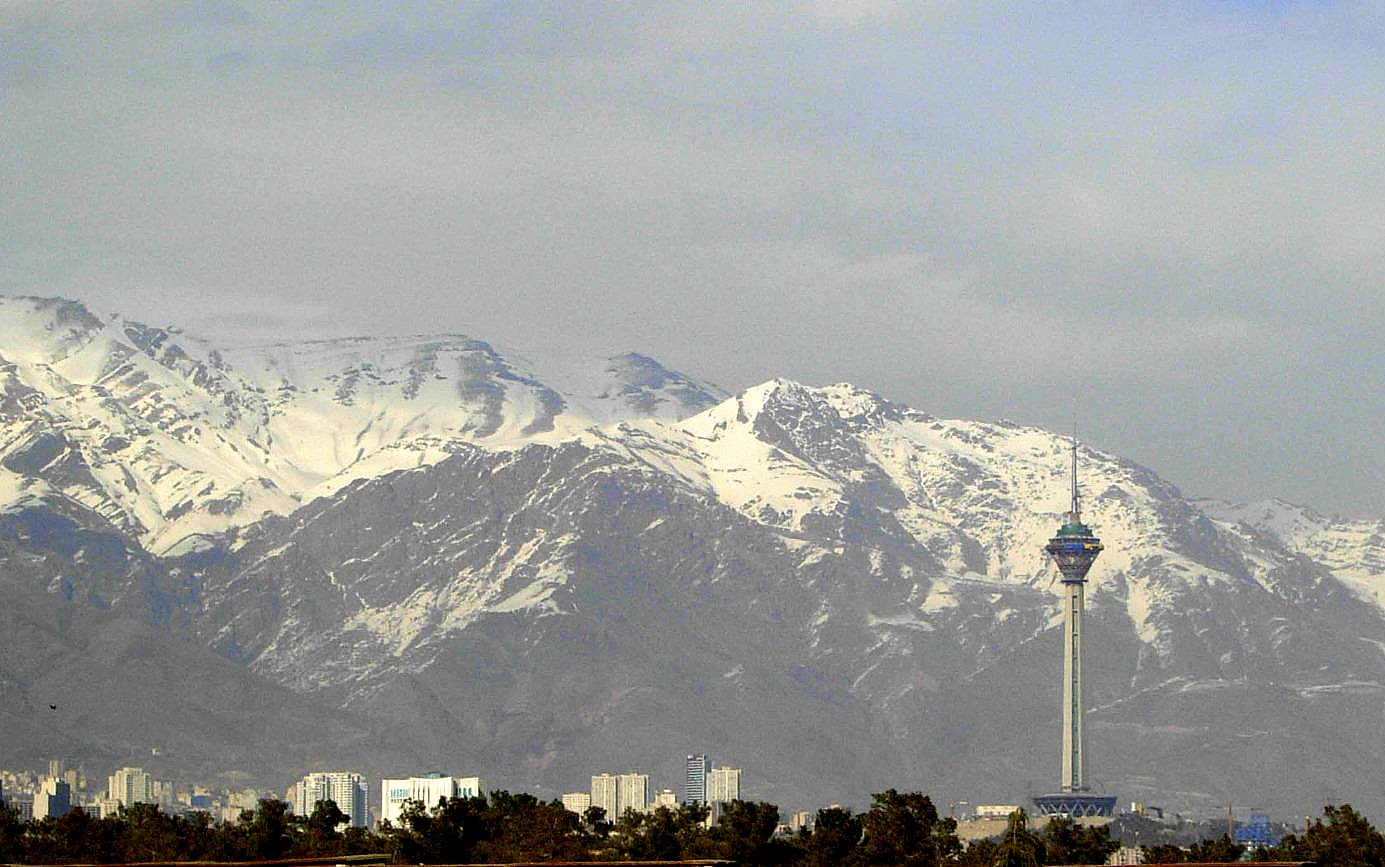
Mount Tochal and the Milad Tower

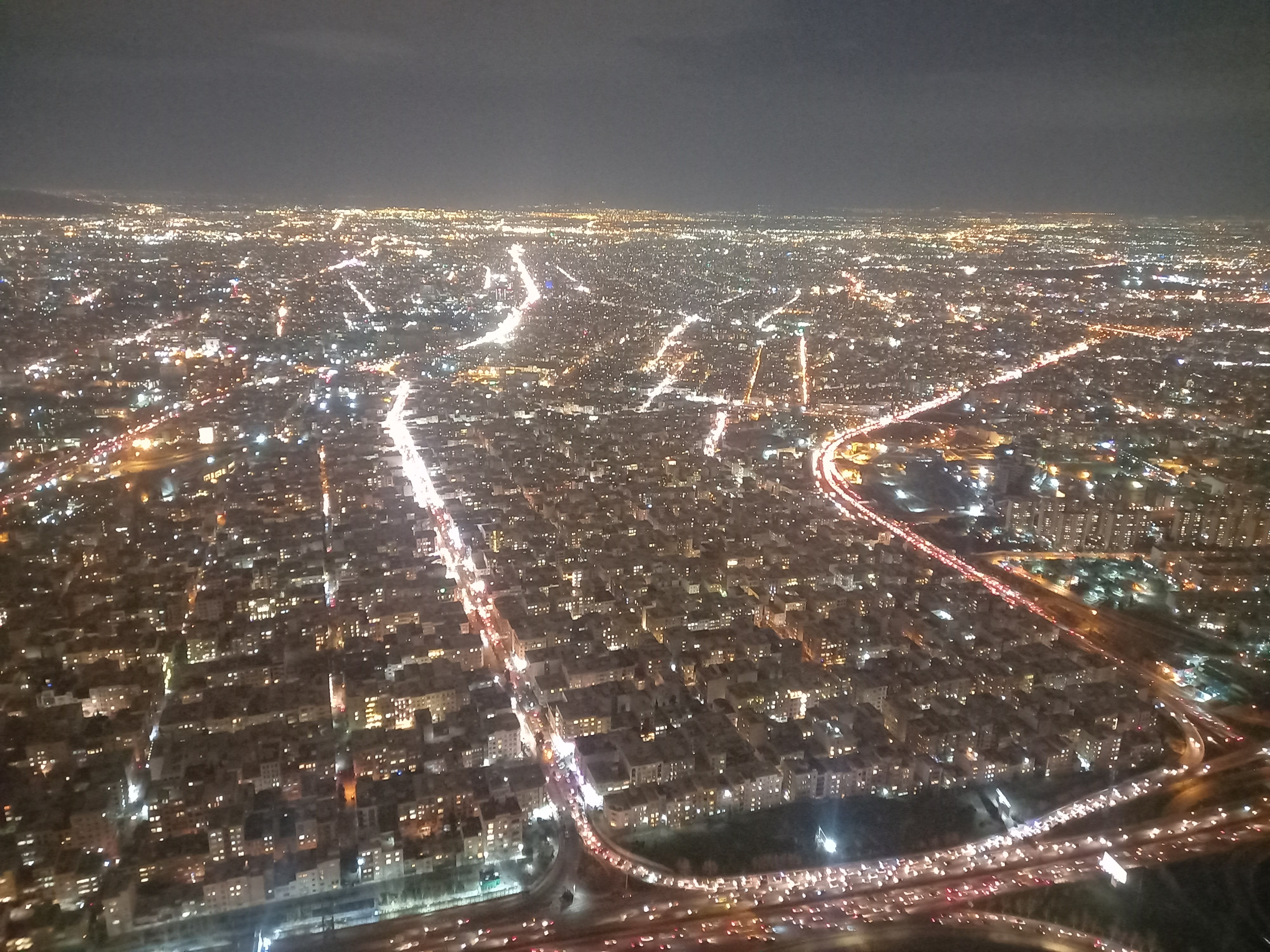
View of Tehran at night from Milad Tower

Milad Tower at night

Milad Tower at night

Milad Tower and a portrait of Ali Khamenei

Milad Tower from below

Milad Tower, and Mount Damavand in Mazandaran

== Ranks ==
- Sixth-tallest freestanding tower in the world
- 24th-tallest freestanding structure in the world

== See also ==
- Fernsehturm Stuttgart – prototype (first TV tower built from concrete)
- List of revolving restaurants
- List of tallest buildings in Tehran
- International rankings of Iran

=== Similar Towers ===
The Kuala Lumpur Tower in Malaysia bears a striking resemblance to the Milad Tower.
