= Salman Shahr =

City in Mazandaran province, Iran

Motel Ghoo Persian: متل قو
- City
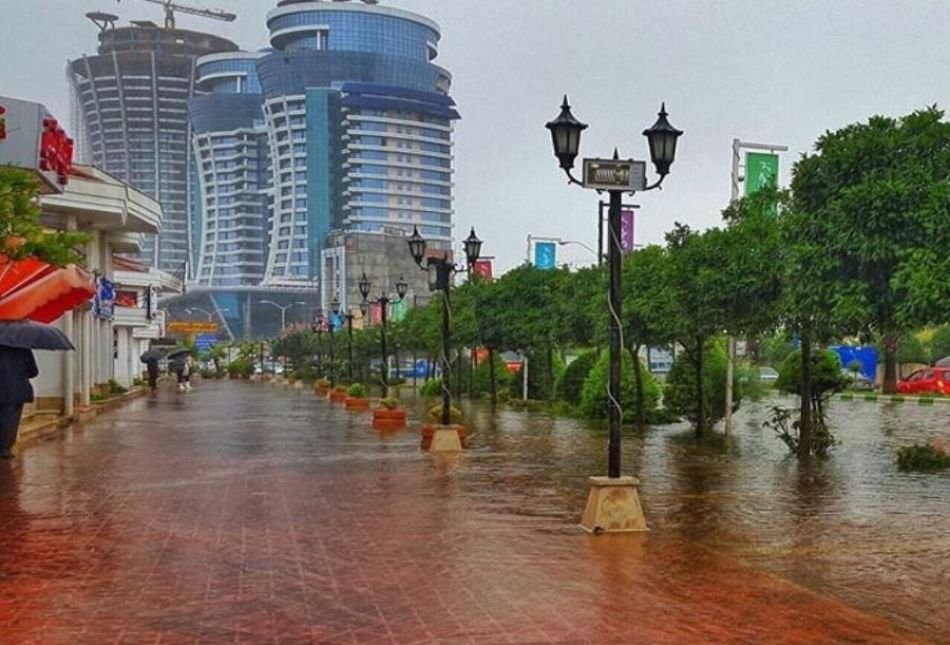
- Motel Ghoo in 2018

- Location within Iran
- Coordinates: 36°42′21″N 51°11′51″E
- Country: Iran
- Province: Mazandaran
- County: Abbasabad
- District: Salmanshahr

Population (2016)
  - Total: 9,656
- Time zone: UTC+3:30 (IRST)
- Website: salmanshahr.com

Salman Shahr (Persian: سلمان‌شهر) (Note: Also romanized as Salmānŝahr; formerly known as Motel Ghoo or Motel Qu (متل قو)) is a city in, and the capital of, Salmanshahr District (Note: Formerly Kelarabad District) in Abbasabad County, Mazandaran province, Iran. It is 30 kilometres (19 mi) east of Tonekabon en route to the city of Chalus.

== Demographics ==
=== Population ===
At the time of the 2006 National Census, the city's population was 9,592 in 2,605 households, when it was in the former Abbasabad District of Tonekabon County. The following census in 2011 counted 8,654 people in 2,560 households, by which time the district had been separated from the county in the establishment of Abbasabad County. The city was transferred to the new Kelarabad District. (Note: Renamed Salmanshahr District) The 2016 census measured the population of the city as 9,656 people in 3,057 households, when the district had been renamed Salmanshahr District.

== Economy ==
Tourism serves as a primary source of revenue for the city. In the late 2000s, a significant development and construction initiative known as "Gou" or "Diamond of the Middle East" commenced. The foundation of these projects was established on the same location as the Gou Motel. This extensive complex, which encompasses commercial, residential, tourist, sports, and entertainment facilities, features a 5-star luxury hotel named the Swan, two 25-story residential twin towers, the Negin Pouria commercial tower, a sports complex, and a six-story parking garage designed in the form of a massive ship.

== Gallery ==
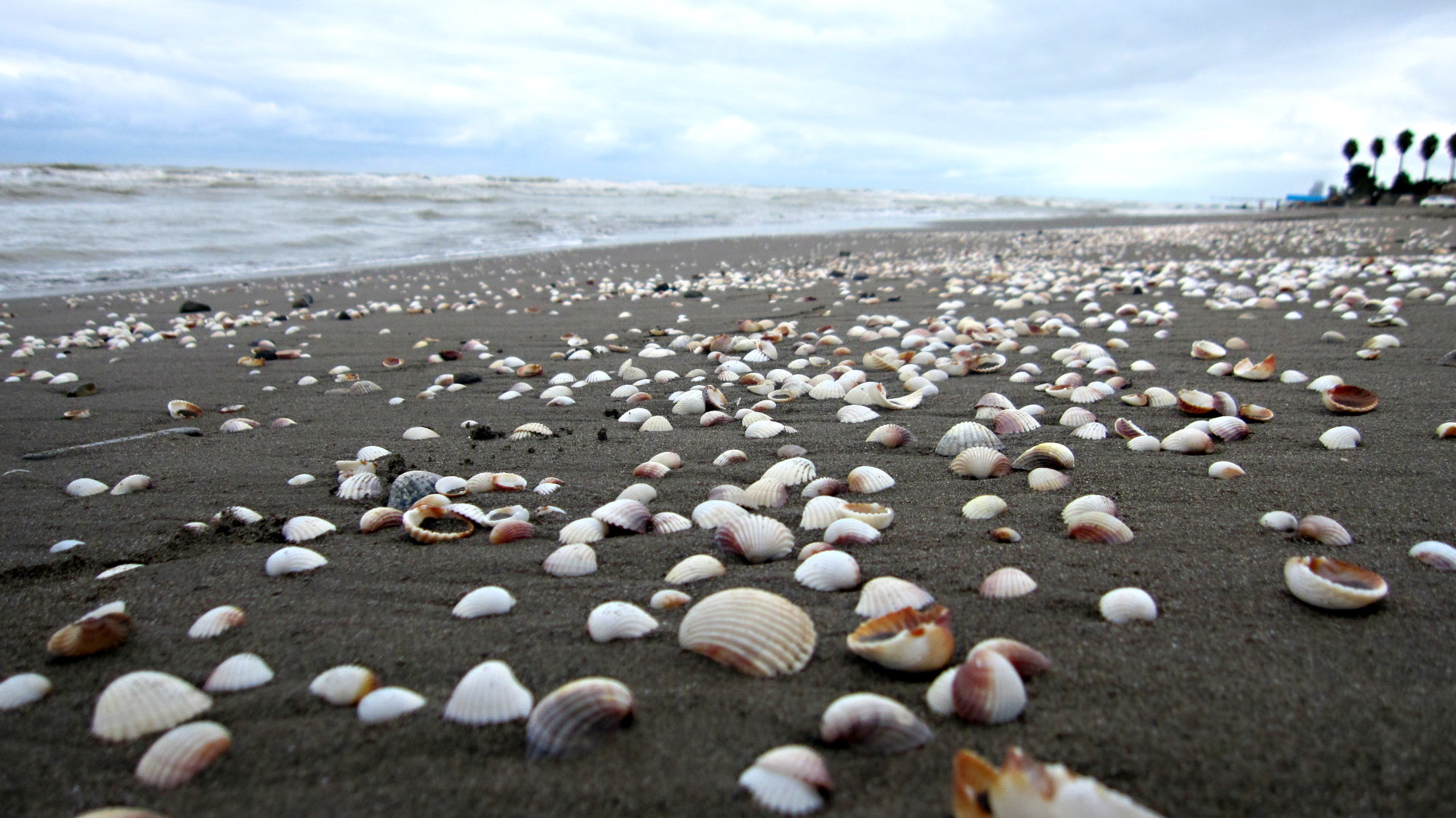
Salman Shahr beach in August 2011

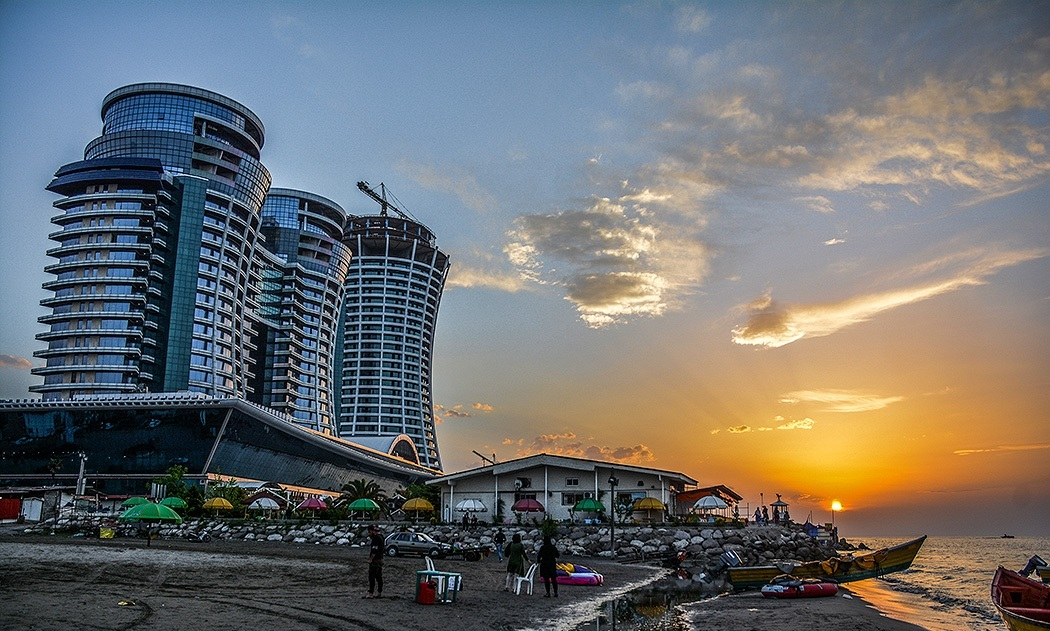
Motel Qu in November 2019
