= Fereshteh Pasargad Hotel =

Mixed-use skyscraper under construction in Tehran, Iran

- Location within Iran

General information
- Status: Topped out
- Type: Mixed-use
- Location: Tehran, Iran
- Coordinates: 35.784155°N 51.429788°E
- Construction started: 2011
- Estimated completion: 2026
- Owner: Fereshteh Pasargad Hotel Co.

Height
- Roof: 235 m (771 ft)

Technical details
- Floor count: 46

Other information
- Number of rooms: 340

The Fereshteh Pasargad Hotel (Persian: هتل فرشته پاسارگاد) is a mixed-use skyscraper currently under construction in the Elahieh neighborhood of Tehran, Iran. Designed by Zaha Hadid Architects, the building is intended to house a luxury hotel and serviced apartments. Upon completion, the building will stand 235 m (771 ft) tall, comprising 46 floors, including basements and a podium, with a total gross floor area of approximately 106,000 square meters (1,140,000 sq ft). As of 2026, the building has structurally topped out at a height of 235 m (771 ft), making it the tallest building in Iran. It surpassed the 192-meter Tabriz World Trade Center to claim this title.

The complex is being developed on a 4,575-square-meter (49,240 sq ft) site and features a total floor area exceeding 105,000 square meters (1,130,000 sq ft). Standing at a height of 235 m (771 ft) across 46 floors, the building is organized into several distinct functional zones. The structure includes nine levels of parking and seven floors dedicated to commercial and office space, conference halls, and retail outlets. Additionally, the building contains four floors for amusement centers and restaurants, one floor for the main lobby, and three floors for mechanical and electrical services. The remaining 30 floors are designated for five-star hotel accommodations.

Construction commenced in 2011. The project has gained recognition for its deep foundation and specialized subterranean construction techniques, which were required to support the high-rise structure within its specific geological context.
