= Miankuh =

Miankuh or Mian Kuh or Miyan Kuh (Persian: ميان كوه, meaning "valley") may refer to:

- Mian Kuh, Gilan, a village in Gilan province, Iran
- Miankuh, Kermanshah, a village in Kermanshah province, Iran
- Miankuh, Khuzestan, a city in Khuzestan province, Iran
- Mian Kuh, Mazandaran, a village in Mazandaran province, Iran
- Miankuh Sadat, a village in Mazandaran province Iran
- Miankuh, Qazvin, a village in Qazvin province, Iran
- Mian Kuh, South Khorasan, a village in South Khorasan province, Iran
- Miankuh District, an administrative subdivision of Chaharmahal and Bakhtiari province, Iran
- Miankuh Rural District (disambiguation), various places in Iran
