= Khoshkrud, Kuhestan =

Village in Mazandaran province, Iran

Khoshkrud Persian: خشكرود
- Village
- Location within Iran
- Coordinates: 36°44′16″N 50°50′51″E
- Country: Iran
- Province: Mazandaran
- County: Tonekabon
- District: Kuhestan
- Rural District: Miyandaman

Population (2016)
  - Total: 80
- Time zone: UTC+3:30 (IRST)

Khoshkrud (Persian: خشكرود) (Note: Also romanized as Khoshkrūd) is a village in Miyandaman Rural District of Kuhestan District in Tonekabon County, Mazandaran province, Iran.

== Demographics ==
=== Population ===
At the time of the 2006 National Census, the village's population was 80 in 22 households, when it was in Baladeh Rural District of Khorramabad District. The following census in 2011 counted 91 people in 28 households. The 2016 census measured the population of the village as 80 people in 27 households.

In 2020, Khoshkrud was separated from the district in the formation of Kuhestan District and transferred to Miyandaman Rural District created in the same district.
