= Gavpol =

Village in Mazandaran province, Iran

Gavpol Persian: گاوپل
- Village
- Location within Iran
- Coordinates: 36°43′07″N 50°50′40″E
- Country: Iran
- Province: Mazandaran
- County: Tonekabon
- District: Kuhestan
- Rural District: Miyandaman

Population (2016)
  - Total: 213
- Time zone: UTC+3:30 (IRST)

Gavpol (Persian: گاوپل) (Note: Also romanized as Gāvpol) is a village in Miyandaman Rural District of Kuhestan District in Tonekabon County, Mazandaran province, Iran.

== Demographics ==
=== Population ===
At the time of the 2006 National Census, the village's population was 144 in 43 households, when it was in Baladeh Rural District of Khorramabad District. The following census in 2011 counted 191 people in 60 households. The 2016 census measured the population of the village as 213 people in 70 households.

In 2020, Gavpol was separated from the district in the formation of Kuhestan District and transferred to Miyandaman Rural District created in the same district.
