= Pardaram =

Village in Mazandaran province, Iran

Pardaram Persian: پردارم
- Village
- Country: Iran
- Province: Mazandaran
- County: Tonekabon
- District: Kuhestan
- Rural District: Miyandaman

Population (2016)
  - Total: 0
- Time zone: UTC+3:30 (IRST)

Pardaram (Persian: پردارم) (Note: Also romanized as Pardāram) is a village in Miyandaman Rural District of Kuhestan District in Tonekabon County, Mazandaran province, Iran.

== Demographics ==
=== Population ===
At the time of the 2006 National Census, the village's population was 17 in five households, when it was in Baladeh Rural District of Khorramabad District. The village did not appear in the following census of 2011. The 2016 census measured the population of the village as zero.

In 2020, Pardaram was separated from the district in the formation of Kuhestan District and transferred to Miyandaman Rural District created in the same district.
