= Tusa Koti =

Village in Mazandaran province, Iran

Tusa Koti Persian: توساكتي
- Village
- Location within Iran
- Coordinates: 36°41′27″N 50°50′36″E
- Country: Iran
- Province: Mazandaran
- County: Tonekabon
- District: Kuhestan
- Rural District: Miyandaman

Population (2016)
  - Total: 280
- Time zone: UTC+3:30 (IRST)

Tusa Koti (Persian: توساكتي) (Note: Also romanized as Tūsā Kotī) is a village in Miyandaman Rural District of Kuhestan District in Tonekabon County, Mazandaran province, Iran.

== Demographics ==
=== Population ===
At the time of the 2006 National Census, the village's population was 267 in 71 households, when it was in Baladeh Rural District of Khorramabad District. The following census in 2011 counted 268 people in 81 households. The 2016 census measured the population of the village as 280 people in 89 households.

In 2020, Tusa Koti was separated from the district in the formation of Kuhestan District and transferred to Miyandaman Rural District created in the same district.
