= Soleyman Mahalleh, Tonekabon =

Village in Mazandaran province, Iran

Soleyman Mahalleh Persian: سليمان محله
- Village
- Location within Iran
- Coordinates: 36°43′40″N 50°52′55″E
- Country: Iran
- Province: Mazandaran
- County: Tonekabon
- District: Kuhestan
- Rural District: Miyandaman

Population (2016)
  - Total: 125
- Time zone: UTC+3:30 (IRST)

Soleyman Mahalleh (Persian: سليمان محله) (Note: Also romanized as Soleymān Maḩalleh) is a village in Miyandaman Rural District of Kuhestan District in Tonekabon County, Mazandaran province, Iran.

== Demographics ==
=== Population ===
At the time of the 2006 National Census, the village's population was 142 in 41 households, when it was in Baladeh Rural District of Khorramabad District. The following census in 2011 counted 164 people in 52 households. The 2016 census measured the population of the village as 125 people in 44 households.

In 2020, Soleyman Mahalleh was separated from the district in the formation of Kuhestan District and transferred to Miyandaman Rural District created in the same district.
