= Naimabad, Mazandaran =

Village in Mazandaran province, Iran

Naimabad Persian: نعيم اباد
- Village
- Country: Iran
- Province: Mazandaran
- County: Tonekabon
- District: Kuhestan
- Rural District: Miyandaman

Population (2016)
  - Total: 53
- Time zone: UTC+3:30 (IRST)

Naimabad (Persian: نعيم اباد) (Note: Also romanized as Naʿīmābād) is a village in Miyandaman Rural District of Kuhestan District in Tonekabon County, Mazandaran province, Iran.

== Demographics ==
=== Population ===
At the time of the 2006 National Census, the village's population was 57 in 12 households, when it was in Baladeh Rural District of Khorramabad District. The following census in 2011 counted 73 people in 22 households. The 2016 census measured the population of the village as 53 people in 19 households.

In 2020, Naimabad was separated from the district in the formation of Kuhestan District and transferred to Miyandaman Rural District created in the same district.
