= Zard Kand =

Village in Mazandaran province, Iran

Zard Kand Persian: زردكند
- Village
- Location within Iran
- Country: Iran
- Province: Mazandaran
- County: Tonekabon
- District: Kuhestan
- Rural District: Miyandaman

Population (2016)
  - Total: 56
- Time zone: UTC+3:30 (IRST)

Zard Kand (Persian: زردكند) is a village in Miyandaman Rural District of Kuhestan District in Tonekabon County, Mazandaran province, Iran.

== Demographics ==
=== Population ===
At the time of the 2006 National Census, the village's population was 45 in 11 households, when it was in Baladeh Rural District of Khorramabad District. The following census in 2011 counted 63 people in 22 households. The 2016 census measured the population of the village as 56 people in 20 households.

In 2020, Zard Kand was separated from the district in the formation of Kuhestan District and transferred to Miyandaman Rural District created in the same district.
