= Deraz Lat =

Village in Mazandaran province, Iran

Deraz Lat Persian: درازلات
- Village
- Location within Iran
- Coordinates: 36°41′33″N 50°50′13″E
- Country: Iran
- Province: Mazandaran
- County: Tonekabon
- District: Kuhestan
- Rural District: Miyandaman

Population (2016)
  - Total: 276
- Time zone: UTC+3:30 (IRST)

Deraz Lat (Persian: درازلات) (Note: Also romanized as Derāz Lāt) is a village in Miyandaman Rural District of Kuhestan District in Tonekabon County, Mazandaran province, Iran.

== Demographics ==
=== Population ===
At the time of the 2006 National Census, the village's population was 26 in eight households, when it was in Baladeh Rural District of Khorramabad District. The village did not appear in the following census of 2011. The 2016 census measured the population of the village as 276 people in 96 households.

In 2020, Deraz Lat was separated from the district in the formation of Kuhestan District and transferred to Miyandaman Rural District created in the same district.
