= Parchin Poshteh =

Village in Mazandaran province, Iran

Parchin Poshteh Persian: پرچين پشته
- Village
- Location within Iran
- Coordinates: 36°43′36″N 50°50′31″E
- Country: Iran
- Province: Mazandaran
- County: Tonekabon
- District: Kuhestan
- Rural District: Miyandaman

Population (2016)
  - Total: 230
- Time zone: UTC+3:30 (IRST)

Parchin Poshteh (Persian: پرچين پشته) (Note: Also romanized as Parchīn Poshteh) is a village in Miyandaman Rural District of Kuhestan District in Tonekabon County, Mazandaran province, Iran.

== Demographics ==
=== Population ===
At the time of the 2006 National Census, the village's population was 197 in 56 households, when it was in Baladeh Rural District of Khorramabad District. The following census in 2011 counted 226 people in 73 households. The 2016 census measured the population of the village as 230 people in 77 households.

In 2020, Parchin Poshteh was separated from the district in the formation of Kuhestan District and transferred to Miyandaman Rural District created in the same district.
