= Emam Zamin =

Village in Mazandaran province, Iran

Emam Zamin Persian: امام زمين
- Village
- Location within Iran
- Coordinates: 36°44′25″N 50°50′31″E
- Country: Iran
- Province: Mazandaran
- County: Tonekabon
- District: Kuhestan
- Rural District: Miyandaman

Population (2016)
  - Total: 133
- Time zone: UTC+3:30 (IRST)

Emam Zamin (Persian: امام زمين) (Note: Also romanized as Emām Zamīn) is a village in Miyandaman Rural District of Kuhestan District in Tonekabon County, Mazandaran province, Iran.

== Demographics ==
=== Population ===
At the time of the 2006 National Census, the village's population was 141 in 47 households, when it was in Baladeh Rural District of Khorramabad District. The following census in 2011 counted 172 people in 58 households. The 2016 census measured the population of the village as 133 people in 47 households.

In 2020, Emam Zamin was separated from the district in the formation of Kuhestan District and transferred to Miyandaman Rural District created in the same district.
