= Savay, Iran =

Village in Mazandaran province, Iran

Savay Persian: سواي
- Village
- Country: Iran
- Province: Mazandaran
- County: Tonekabon
- District: Kuhestan
- Rural District: Miyandaman

Population (2016)
  - Total: 49
- Time zone: UTC+3:30 (IRST)

Savay (Persian: سواي) (Note: Also romanized as Savāy) is a village in Miyandaman Rural District of Kuhestan District in Tonekabon County, Mazandaran province, Iran.

== Demographics ==
=== Population ===
At the time of the 2006 National Census, the village's population was 62 in 16 households, when it was in Baladeh Rural District of Khorramabad District. The following census in 2011 counted 63 people in 21 households. The 2016 census measured the population of the village as 49 people in 16 households.

In 2020, Savay was separated from the district in the formation of Kuhestan District and transferred to Miyandaman Rural District created in the same district.
