= Lireh Sar =

Village in Mazandaran province, Iran

Lireh Sar Persian: ليره سر
- Village
- Location within Iran
- Coordinates: 36°40′36″N 50°53′50″E
- Country: Iran
- Province: Mazandaran
- County: Tonekabon
- District: Kuhestan
- Rural District: Miyandaman

Population (2016)
  - Total: 1,084
- Time zone: UTC+3:30 (IRST)

Lireh Sar (Persian: ليره سر) (Note: Also romanized as Līreh Sar; also known as Līr Sar and Līresar) is a village in Miyandaman Rural District of Kuhestan District in Tonekabon County, Mazandaran province, Iran.

== Demographics ==
=== Population ===
At the time of the 2006 National Census, the village's population was 1,018 in 237 households, when it was in Baladeh Rural District of Khorramabad District. The following census in 2011 counted 997 people in 291 households. The 2016 census measured the population of the village as 1,084 people in 337 households.

In 2020, Lireh Sar was separated from the district in the formation of Kuhestan District and transferred to Miyandaman Rural District created in the same district.
