= Sadeqabad, Mazandaran =

Village in Mazandaran province, Iran

Sadeqabad Persian: صادق اباد
- Village
- Location within Iran
- Coordinates: 36°41′47″N 50°51′41″E
- Country: Iran
- Province: Mazandaran
- County: Tonekabon
- District: Kuhestan
- Rural District: Miyandaman

Population (2016)
  - Total: 251
- Time zone: UTC+3:30 (IRST)

Sadeqabad (Persian: صادق اباد) (Note: Also romanized as Şādeqābād) is a village in Miyandaman Rural District of Kuhestan District in Tonekabon County, Mazandaran province, Iran.

== Demographics ==
=== Population ===
At the time of the 2006 National Census, the village's population was 214 in 60 households, when it was in Baladeh Rural District of Khorramabad District. The following census in 2011 counted 302 people in 103 households. The 2016 census measured the population of the village as 251 people in 85 households.

In 2020, Sadeqabad was separated from the district in the formation of Kuhestan District and transferred to Miyandaman Rural District created in the same district.
