= Garma Poshteh =

Village in Mazandaran province, Iran

Garma Poshteh Persian: گرماپشته
- Village
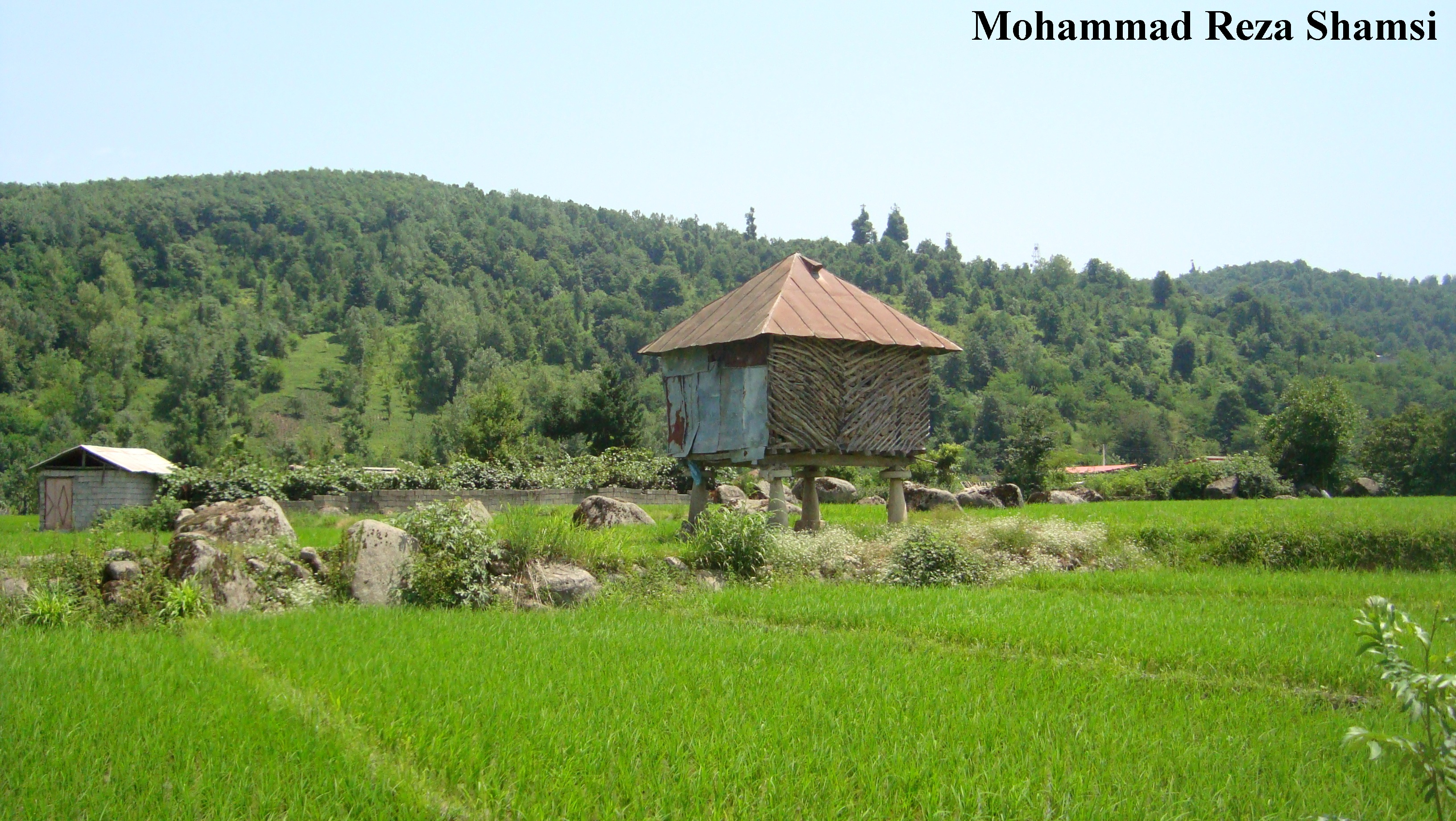
- The village of Garma Poshteh

- Location within Iran
- Coordinates: 36°44′18″N 50°51′33″E
- Country: Iran
- Province: Mazandaran
- County: Tonekabon
- District: Kuhestan
- Rural District: Miyandaman

Population (2016)
  - Total: 418
- Time zone: UTC+3:30 (IRST)

Garma Poshteh (Persian: گرماپشته) (Note: Also romanized as Garmā Poshteh) is a village in Miyandaman Rural District of Kuhestan District in Tonekabon County, Mazandaran province, Iran.

== Demographics ==
=== Population ===
At the time of the 2006 National Census, the village's population was 290 in 78 households, when it was in Baladeh Rural District of Khorramabad District. The following census in 2011 counted 443 people in 153 households. The 2016 census measured the population of the village as 418 people in 152 households.

In 2020, Garma Poshteh was separated from the district in the formation of Kuhestan District and transferred to Miyandaman Rural District created in the same district.
