= Asadabad, Tonekabon =

Village in Mazandaran province, Iran

Asadabad Persian: اسداباد
- Village
- Location within Iran
- Coordinates: 36°41′37″N 50°52′54″E
- Country: Iran
- Province: Mazandaran
- County: Tonekabon
- District: Kuhestan
- Rural District: Miyandaman

Population (2016)
  - Total: 225
- Time zone: UTC+3:30 (IRST)

Asadabad (Persian: اسداباد) (Note: Also romanized as Asadābād) is a village in Miyandaman Rural District of Kuhestan District in Tonekabon County, Mazandaran province, Iran.

== Demographics ==
=== Population ===
At the time of the 2006 National Census, the village's population was 208 in 52 households, when it was in Baladeh Rural District of Khorramabad District. The following census in 2011 counted 225 people in 62 households. The 2016 census measured the population of the village as 225 people in 68 households.

In 2020, Asadabad was separated from the district in the formation of Kuhestan District and transferred to Miyandaman Rural District created in the same district.
