= Mehdiabad, Tonekabon =

Village in Mazandaran province, Iran

Mehdiabad Persian: مهدي اباد
- Village
- Location within Iran
- Coordinates: 36°44′20″N 50°49′30″E
- Country: Iran
- Province: Mazandaran
- County: Tonekabon
- District: Kuhestan
- Rural District: Miyandaman

Population (2016)
  - Total: 183
- Time zone: UTC+3:30 (IRST)

Mehdiabad (Persian: مهدي اباد) (Note: Also romanized as Mahdiabad, Mahdīābād, and Mehdīābād) is a village in Miyandaman Rural District of Kuhestan District in Tonekabon County, Mazandaran province, Iran.

== Demographics ==
=== Population ===
At the time of the 2006 National Census, the village's population was 192 in 46 households, when it was in Baladeh Rural District of Khorramabad District. The following census in 2011 counted 203 people in 61 households. The 2016 census measured the population of the village as 183 people in 63 households.

In 2020, Mehdiabad was separated from the district in the formation of Kuhestan District and transferred to Miyandaman Rural District created in the same district.
