= Khom Gardan =

Village in Mazandaran province, Iran

Khom Gardan Persian: خم گردن
- Village
- Location within Iran
- Coordinates: 36°43′53″N 50°51′11″E
- Country: Iran
- Province: Mazandaran
- County: Tonekabon
- District: Kuhestan
- Rural District: Miyandaman

Population (2016)
  - Total: 14
- Time zone: UTC+3:30 (IRST)

Khom Gardan (Persian: خم گردن) (Note: Also romanized as Khomgardān; also known as Khomagdān) is a village in Miyandaman Rural District of Kuhestan District in Tonekabon County, Mazandaran province, Iran.

== Demographics ==
=== Population ===
At the time of the 2006 National Census, the village's population was 22 in seven households, when it was in Baladeh Rural District of Khorramabad District. The following census in 2011 counted 12 people in six households. The 2016 census measured the population of the village as 14 people in eight households.

In 2020, Khom Gardan was separated from the district in the formation of Kuhestan District and transferred to Miyandaman Rural District created in the same district.
