= Miyandaman Rural District =

Rural district in Mazandaran province, Iran

Miyandaman Rural District Persian: دهستان میاندامان
- Rural District
- Location within Iran
- Coordinates: 36°40′N 50°52′E
- Country: Iran
- Province: Mazandaran
- County: Tonekabon
- District: Kuhestan
- Established: 2020
- Capital: Latak
- Time zone: UTC+3:30 (IRST)

Miyandaman Rural District (Persian: دهستان میاندامان) is in Kuhestan District of Tonekabon County, Mazandaran province, Iran. Its capital is the village of Latak, whose population at the time of the 2016 National Census was 434 people in 140 households.

== History ==
In 2020, Do Hezar and Seh Hezar Rural Districts were separated from Khorramabad District in the formation of Kuhestan District, and Miyandaman Rural District was created in the new district.

== Other villages in the rural district ==
- Aghuz Koti
- Asadabad
- Asgariabad
- Darbar
- Deraz Lat
- Emam Zamin
- Garma Poshteh
- Gavpol
- Gol-e Aliabad
- Haratbar
- Kalachpa
- Khom Gardan
- Khoshkrud
- Lireh Sar
- Mehdiabad
- Naimabad
- Parchin Poshteh
- Pardaram
- Pordeh Sar
- Qashoqtarash Mahalleh
- Sadeqabad
- Savay
- Soleyman Mahalleh
- Tusa Koti
- Valamrud
- Zard Kand
