= Haratbar =

Haratbar or Harat Bar (Persian: هراتبر) may refer to:

- Harat Bar, Chaboksar, Rudsar County, Gilan Province
- Harat Bar, Rahimabad, Rudsar County, Gilan Province
- Haratbar, Mazandaran
