= Valamrud =

Village in Mazandaran province, Iran

Valamrud Persian: ولمرود
- Village
- Location within Iran
- Coordinates: 36°44′39″N 50°51′03″E
- Country: Iran
- Province: Mazandaran
- County: Tonekabon
- District: Kuhestan
- Rural District: Miyandaman

Population (2016)
  - Total: 157
- Time zone: UTC+3:30 (IRST)

Valamrud (Persian: ولمرود) (Note: Also romanized as Valamrūd) is a village in Miyandaman Rural District of Kuhestan District in Tonekabon County, Mazandaran province, Iran.

== Demographics ==
=== Population ===
At the time of the 2006 National Census, the village's population was 129 in 35 households, when it was in Baladeh Rural District of Khorramabad District. The following census in 2011 counted 171 people in 60 households. The 2016 census measured the population of the village as 157 people in 58 households.

In 2020, Valamrud was separated from the district in the formation of Kuhestan District and transferred to Miyandaman Rural District created in the same district.
