= Qashoqtarash Mahalleh =

Village in Mazandaran province, Iran

Qashoqtarash Mahalleh Persian: قاشق تراش محله
- Village
- Location within Iran
- Coordinates: 36°42′00″N 50°53′00″E
- Country: Iran
- Province: Mazandaran
- County: Tonekabon
- District: Kuhestan
- Rural District: Miyandaman

Population (2016)
  - Total: 409
- Time zone: UTC+3:30 (IRST)

Qashoqtarash Mahalleh (Persian: قاشق تراش محله) (Note: Also romanized as Qāshoqtarāsh Maḩalleh; also known as Qāshoqtarāsh) is a village in Miyandaman Rural District of Kuhestan District in Tonekabon County, Mazandaran province, Iran.

== Demographics ==
=== Population ===
At the time of the 2006 National Census, the village's population was 374 in 105 households, when it was in Baladeh Rural District of Khorramabad District. The following census in 2011 counted 493 people in 153 households. The 2016 census measured the population of the village as 409 people in 148 households.

In 2020, Qashoqtarash Mahalleh was separated from the district in the formation of Kuhestan District and transferred to Miyandaman Rural District created in the same district.
