= Aghuz Koti, Tonekabon =

Village in Mazandaran province, Iran

Aghuz Koti Persian: اغوزكتي
- Village
- Location within Iran
- Coordinates: 36°40′48″N 50°51′45″E
- Country: Iran
- Province: Mazandaran
- County: Tonekabon
- District: Kuhestan
- Rural District: Miyandaman

Population (2016)
  - Total: 138
- Time zone: UTC+3:30 (IRST)

Aghuz Koti (Persian: اغوزكتي) (Note: Also romanized as Āghūz Kotī; also known as Āghūzdār Kolūm) is a village in Miyandaman Rural District of Kuhestan District in Tonekabon County, Mazandaran province, Iran.

== Demographics ==
=== Population ===
At the time of the 2006 National Census, the village's population was 144 in 37 households, when it was in Baladeh Rural District of Khorramabad District. The following census in 2011 counted 129 people in 41 households. The 2016 census measured the population of the village as 138 people in 48 households.

In 2020, Aghuz Koti was separated from the district in the formation of Kuhestan District and transferred to Miyandaman Rural District created in the same district.
