= Latak, Mazandaran =

Village in Mazandaran province, Iran

Latak Persian: لتاک
- Village
- Location within Iran
- Coordinates: 36°44′13″N 50°50′41″E
- Country: Iran
- Province: Mazandaran
- County: Tonekabon
- District: Kuhestan
- Rural District: Miyandaman

Population (2016)
  - Total: 434
- Time zone: UTC+3:30 (IRST)

Latak (Persian: لتاک) (Note: Also romanized as Latāk) is a village in, and the capital of, Miyandaman Rural District in Kuhestan District of Tonekabon County, Mazandaran province, Iran.

== Demographics ==
=== Population ===
At the time of the 2006 National Census, the village's population was 394 in 107 households, when it was in Baladeh Rural District of Khorramabad District. The following census in 2011 counted 343 people in 111 households. The 2016 census measured the population of the village as 434 people in 140 households.

In 2020, Latak was separated from the district in the formation of Kuhestan District and transferred to Miyandaman Rural District created in the same district.
