= Pordeh Sar, Mazandaran =

Village in Mazandaran province, Iran

Pordeh Sar Persian: پرده سر
- Village
- Location within Iran
- Coordinates: 36°41′16″N 50°50′02″E
- Country: Iran
- Province: Mazandaran
- County: Tonekabon
- District: Kuhestan
- Rural District: Miyandaman

Population (2016)
  - Total: 90
- Time zone: UTC+3:30 (IRST)

Pordeh Sar (Persian: پرده سر) (Note: Also known as Pordsar) is a village in Miyandaman Rural District of Kuhestan District in Tonekabon County, Mazandaran province, Iran.

== Demographics ==
=== Population ===
At the time of the 2006 National Census, the village's population was 97 in 30 households, when it was in Baladeh Rural District of Khorramabad District. The following census in 2011 counted 187 people in 63 households. The 2016 census measured the population of the village as 90 people in 32 households.

In 2020, Pordeh Sar was separated from the district in the formation of Kuhestan District and transferred to Miyandaman Rural District created in the same district.
