= Darbar, Mazandaran =

Village in Mazandaran province, Iran

Darbar Persian: داربار
- Village
- Location within Iran
- Coordinates: 36°42′38″N 50°50′41″E
- Country: Iran
- Province: Mazandaran
- County: Tonekabon
- District: Kuhestan
- Rural District: Miyandaman

Population (2016)
  - Total: 207
- Time zone: UTC+3:30 (IRST)

Darbar (Persian: داربار) (Note: Also romanized as Dārbār) is a village in Miyandaman Rural District of Kuhestan District in Tonekabon County, Mazandaran province, Iran.

== Demographics ==
=== Population ===
At the time of the 2006 National Census, the village's population was 180 in 47 households, when it was in Baladeh Rural District of Khorramabad District. The following census in 2011 counted 233 people in 86 households. The 2016 census measured the population of the village as 207 people in 66 households.

In 2020, Darbar was separated from the district in the formation of Kuhestan District and transferred to Miyandaman Rural District created in the same district.
