= Kalachpa =

Village in Mazandaran province, Iran

Kalachpa Persian: كلاچ پا
- Village
- Location within Iran
- Coordinates: 36°41′09″N 50°51′06″E
- Country: Iran
- Province: Mazandaran
- County: Tonekabon
- District: Kuhestan
- Rural District: Miyandaman

Population (2016)
  - Total: 63
- Time zone: UTC+3:30 (IRST)

Kalachpa (Persian: كلاچ پا) (Note: Also romanized as Kalāchpā; also known as Kalāj Pā) is a village in Miyandaman Rural District of Kuhestan District in Tonekabon County, Mazandaran province, Iran.

== Demographics ==
=== Population ===
At the time of the 2006 National Census, the village's population was 60 in 16 households, when it was in Baladeh Rural District of Khorramabad District. The following census in 2011 counted 49 people in 12 households. The 2016 census measured the population of the village as 63 people in 17 households.

In 2020, Kalachpa was separated from the district in the formation of Kuhestan District and transferred to Miyandaman Rural District created in the same district.
