= Asgariabad =

Village in Mazandaran province, Iran

Asgariabad Persian: عسگرئ آباد
- Village
- Location within Iran
- Coordinates: 36°44′48″N 50°50′12″E
- Country: Iran
- Province: Mazandaran
- County: Tonekabon
- District: Kuhestan
- Rural District: Miyandaman

Population (2016)
  - Total: 65
- Time zone: UTC+3:30 (IRST)

Asgariabad (Persian: عسگرئ آباد) (Note: Also romanized as ʿAsgarīābād; also known as ʿAsgarīābād-e Soflá) is a village in Miyandaman Rural District of Kuhestan District in Tonekabon County, Mazandaran province, Iran.

== Demographics ==
=== Population ===
At the time of the 2006 National Census, the village's population was 65 in 25 households, when it was in Baladeh Rural District of Khorramabad District. The following census in 2011 counted 58 people in 25 households. The 2016 census measured the population of the village as 65 people in 31 households.

In 2020, Asgariabad was separated from the district in the formation of Kuhestan District and transferred to Miyandaman Rural District created in the same district.
