= Eshtuj =

Eshtuj or Oshtuj (Persian: اشتوج), also rendered as Eshtukh, may refer to:

- Bala Eshtuj
- Pain Eshtuj
