= Sarvash Poshteh =

Village in Mazandaran province, Iran

Sarvash Poshteh Persian: سرواش پشته
- Village
- Location within Iran
- Coordinates: 36°37′38″N 50°50′12″E
- Country: Iran
- Province: Mazandaran
- County: Tonekabon
- District: Kuhestan
- Rural District: Seh Hezar

Population (2016)
  - Total: 53
- Time zone: UTC+3:30 (IRST)

Sarvash Poshteh (Persian: سرواش پشته) (Note: Also romanized as Sarvāsh Poshteh and Sarvāshposhteh) is a village in Seh Hezar Rural District of Kuhestan District in Tonekabon County, Mazandaran province, Iran.

== Demographics ==
=== Population ===
At the time of the 2006 National Census, the village's population was 43 in 10 households, when it was in Khorramabad District. The following census in 2011 counted 53 people in 19 households. The 2016 census measured the population of the village as 53 people in 19 households.

In 2020, the rural district was separated from the district in the formation of Kuhestan District.
