= Yan Dasht-e Bala =

Village in Mazandaran province, Iran

Yan Dasht-e Bala Persian: ياندشت بالا
- Village
- Location within Iran
- Coordinates: 36°38′17″N 50°50′24″E
- Country: Iran
- Province: Mazandaran
- County: Tonekabon
- District: Kuhestan
- Rural District: Seh Hezar

Population (2016)
  - Total: 145
- Time zone: UTC+3:30 (IRST)

Yan Dasht-e Bala (Persian: ياندشت بالا) (Note: Also romanized as Yān Dasht-e Bālā; also known as Yān Dasht) is a village in Seh Hezar Rural District of Kuhestan District in Tonekabon County, Mazandaran province, Iran.

== Demographics ==
=== Population ===
At the time of the 2006 National Census, the village's population was 139 in 36 households, when it was in Khorramabad District. The following census in 2011 counted 188 people in 62 households. The 2016 census measured the population of the village as 145 people in 48 households.

In 2020, the rural district was separated from the district in the formation of Kuhestan District.
