= Khanian, Mazandaran =

Village in Mazandaran province, Iran

Khanian Persian: خانيان
- Village
- Location within Iran
- Coordinates: 36°35′13″N 50°49′49″E
- Country: Iran
- Province: Mazandaran
- County: Tonekabon
- District: Kuhestan
- Rural District: Seh Hezar

Population (2016)
  - Total: 72
- Time zone: UTC+3:30 (IRST)

Khanian (Persian: خانيان) (Note: Also romanized as Khānīān and Khānīyān) is a village in Seh Hezar Rural District of Kuhestan District in Tonekabon County, Mazandaran province, Iran.

== Demographics ==
=== Population ===
At the time of the 2006 National Census, the village's population was 32 in nine households, when it was in Khorramabad District. The following census in 2011 counted 168 people in 56 households. The 2016 census measured the population of the village as 72 people in 27 households.

In 2020, the rural district was separated from the district in the formation of Kuhestan District.
