= Naras =

Village in Mazandaran province, Iran

Naras Persian: نرس
- Village
- Location within Iran
- Coordinates: 36°36′54″N 50°43′52″E
- Country: Iran
- Province: Mazandaran
- County: Tonekabon
- District: Kuhestan
- Rural District: Do Hezar

Population (2016)
  - Total: 140
- Time zone: UTC+3:30 (IRST)

Naras (Persian: نرس) (Note: Also known as Bālā Naras) is a village in Do Hezar Rural District of Kuhestan District in Tonekabon County, Mazandaran province, Iran.

== Demographics ==
=== Population ===
At the time of the 2006 National Census, the village's population was 97 in 22 households, when it was in Khorramabad District. The following census in 2011 counted 105 people in 33 households. The 2016 census measured the population of the village as 140 people in 50 households.

In 2020, the rural district was separated from the district in the formation of Kuhestan District.
