= Hameshbur =

Village in Mazandaran province, Iran

Hameshbur Persian: همش بور
- Village
- Location within Iran
- Coordinates: 36°45′32″N 50°55′07″E
- Country: Iran
- Province: Mazandaran
- County: Tonekabon
- District: Khorramabad
- Rural District: Baladeh-ye Sharqi

Population (2016)
  - Total: 140
- Time zone: UTC+3:30 (IRST)

Hameshbur (Persian: همش بور) (Note: Also romanized as Hameshbūr; also known as Hameshpūr) is a village in Baladeh-ye Sharqi Rural District of Khorramabad District in Tonekabon County, Mazandaran province, Iran.

== Demographics ==
=== Population ===
At the time of the 2006 National Census, the village's population was 129 in 35 households, when it was in Baladeh Rural District. The following census in 2011 counted 129 people in 41 households. The 2016 census measured the population of the village as 140 people in 44 households.

In 2020, Hameshbur was transferred to Baladeh-ye Sharqi Rural District created in the same district.
