= Pas Kalayeh-ye Bozorg =

Village in Mazandaran province, Iran

Pas Kalayeh-ye Bozorg Persian: پسكلايه بزرگ
- Village
- Location within Iran
- Coordinates: 36°47′47″N 50°53′03″E
- Country: Iran
- Province: Mazandaran
- County: Tonekabon
- District: Khorramabad
- Rural District: Baladeh-ye Sharqi

Population (2016)
  - Total: 1,136
- Time zone: UTC+3:30 (IRST)

Pas Kalayeh-ye Bozorg (Persian: پسكلايه بزرگ) (Note: Also romanized as Pas Kalāyeh-ye Bozorg; also known as Pas Kalāyeh) is a village in Baladeh-ye Sharqi Rural District of Khorramabad District in Tonekabon County, Mazandaran province, Iran.

== Demographics ==
=== Population ===
At the time of the 2006 National Census, the village's population was 1,196 in 330 households, when it was in Baladeh Rural District. The following census in 2011 counted 1,810 people in 571 households. The 2016 census measured the population of the village as 1,136 people in 368 households.

In 2020, Pas Kalayeh-ye Bozorg was transferred to Baladeh-ye Sharqi Rural District created in the same district.
