= Kenarvar =

Village in Mazandaran province, Iran

Kenarvar Persian: كنارور
- Village
- Location within Iran
- Coordinates: 36°45′59″N 50°53′32″E
- Country: Iran
- Province: Mazandaran
- County: Tonekabon
- District: Khorramabad
- Rural District: Baladeh-ye Sharqi

Population (2016)
  - Total: 164
- Time zone: UTC+3:30 (IRST)

Kenarvar (Persian: كنارور) (Note: Also romanized as Kenārvar) is a village in Baladeh-ye Sharqi Rural District of Khorramabad District in Tonekabon County, Mazandaran province, Iran.

== Demographics ==
=== Population ===
At the time of the 2006 National Census, the village's population was 146 in 44 households, when it was in Baladeh Rural District. The following census in 2011 counted 131 people in 42 households. The 2016 census measured the population of the village as 164 people in 56 households.

In 2020, Kenarvar was transferred to Baladeh-ye Sharqi Rural District created in the same district.
