= Jir-e Balan =

Jir-e Balan جيربالان
- Village
- Country: Iran
- Province: Mazandaran
- County: Tonekabon
- Bakhsh: Khorramabad
- Rural District: Seh Hezar

Population (2006)
  - Total: 11
- Time zone: UTC+3:30 (IRST)
  - Summer (DST): UTC+4:30 (IRDT)

Jir-e Balan (Persian: جيربالان, also Romanized as Jīr-e Bālān) is a village in Seh Hezar Rural District, Khorramabad District, Tonekabon County, Mazandaran Province, Iran. At the 2006 census, its population was 11, in 4 families.
