= Qaleh Gardan =

Qaleh Gardan (Persian: قلعه گردن) may refer to:

- Qaleh Gardan, Gilan
- Qaleh Gardan, Mazandaran
