= Salaj Anbar =

Salaj Anbar سلج انبار
- Village
- Location within Iran
- Coordinates: 36°26′01″N 50°48′14″E
- Country: Iran
- Province: Mazandaran
- County: Tonekabon
- Bakhsh: Khorramabad
- Rural District: Seh Hezar

Population (2006)
  - Total: 31
- Time zone: UTC+3:30 (IRST)
  - Summer (DST): UTC+4:30 (IRDT)

Salaj Anbar (Persian: سلج انبار, also Romanized as Salaj Anbār) is a village in Seh Hezar Rural District, Khorramabad District, Tonekabon County, Mazandaran Province, Iran. At the 2006 census, its population was 31, in 10 families.
