= Emamzadeh Qasem, Mazandaran =

Village in Mazandaran province, Iran

Emamzadeh Qasem Persian: امامزاده قاسم
- Village
- Location within Iran
- Coordinates: 36°38′14″N 50°44′32″E
- Country: Iran
- Province: Mazandaran
- County: Tonekabon
- District: Kuhestan
- Rural District: Do Hezar

Population (2016)
  - Total: 179
- Time zone: UTC+3:30 (IRST)

Emamzadeh Qasem (Persian: امامزاده قاسم) (Note: Also romanized as Emāmzādeh Qāsem) is a village in, and the capital of, Do Hezar Rural District in Kuhestan District of Tonekabon County, Mazandaran province, Iran.

== Demographics ==
=== Population ===
At the time of the 2006 National Census, the village's population was 114 in 39 households, when it was in Khorramabad District. The following census in 2011 counted 273 people in 94 households. The 2016 census measured the population of the village as 179 people in 62 households.

In 2020, the rural district was separated from the district in the formation of Kuhestan District.
