= Azizabad, Mazandaran =

Village in Mazandaran province, Iran

Azizabad Persian: عزيزاباد
- Village
- Location within Iran
- Coordinates: 36°44′29″N 50°54′43″E
- Country: Iran
- Province: Mazandaran
- County: Tonekabon
- District: Khorramabad
- Rural District: Baladeh-ye Sharqi

Population (2016)
  - Total: 870
- Time zone: UTC+3:30 (IRST)

Azizabad (Persian: عزيزاباد) (Note: Also romanized as ʿAzīzābād) is a village in Baladeh-ye Sharqi Rural District of Khorramabad District in Tonekabon County, Mazandaran province, Iran.

== Demographics ==
=== Population ===
At the time of the 2006 National Census, the village's population was 656 in 180 households, when it was in Baladeh Rural District. The following census in 2011 counted 789 people in 233 households. The 2016 census measured the population of the village as 870 people in 275 households.

In 2020, Azizabad was transferred to Baladeh-ye Sharqi Rural District created in the same district.
