= Akbarabad, Tonekabon =

Village in Mazandaran province, Iran

Akbarabad Persian: اكبراباد
- Village
- Location within Iran
- Coordinates: 36°46′32″N 50°53′15″E
- Country: Iran
- Province: Mazandaran
- County: Tonekabon
- District: Khorramabad
- Rural District: Baladeh-ye Sharqi

Population (2016)
  - Total: 196
- Time zone: UTC+3:30 (IRST)

Akbarabad (Persian: اكبراباد) (Note: Also romanized as Akbarābād) is a village in Baladeh-ye Sharqi Rural District of Khorramabad District in Tonekabon County, Mazandaran province, Iran.

== Demographics ==
=== Population ===
At the time of the 2006 National Census, the village's population was 217 in 54 households, when it was in Baladeh Rural District. The following census in 2011 counted 169 people in 49 households. The 2016 census measured the population of the village as 196 people in 66 households.

In 2020, Akbarabad was transferred to Baladeh-ye Sharqi Rural District created in the same district.
