= Halavan-e Pain =

Halavan-e Pain هلوان پائين
- Village
- Location within Iran
- Coordinates: 36°34′30″N 50°49′56″E
- Country: Iran
- Province: Mazandaran
- County: Tonekabon
- Bakhsh: Khorramabad
- Rural District: Seh Hezar

Population (2006)
  - Total: 20
- Time zone: UTC+3:30 (IRST)
  - Summer (DST): UTC+4:30 (IRDT)

Halavan-e Pain (Persian: هلوان پائين, also Romanized as Halavān-e Pā’īn; also known as Halavān and Halvīān) is a village in Seh Hezar Rural District, Khorramabad District, Tonekabon County, Mazandaran Province, Iran. At the 2006 census, its population was 20, in 4 families.
