= Var Zamin =

Var Zamin ورزمين
- Village
- Country: Iran
- Province: Mazandaran
- County: Tonekabon
- Bakhsh: Khorramabad
- Rural District: Seh Hezar

Population (2006)
  - Total: 34
- Time zone: UTC+3:30 (IRST)
  - Summer (DST): UTC+4:30 (IRDT)

Var Zamin (Persian: ورزمين, also Romanized as Var Zamīn) is a village in Seh Hezar Rural District, Khorramabad District, Tonekabon County, Mazandaran Province, Iran. At the 2006 census, its population was 34, in 9 families.
