= Gil Mahalleh =

Village in Mazandaran province, Iran

Gil Mahalleh Persian: گيل محله
- Village
- Location within Iran
- Coordinates: 36°46′37″N 50°54′20″E
- Country: Iran
- Province: Mazandaran
- County: Tonekabon
- District: Khorramabad
- Rural District: Baladeh-ye Sharqi

Population (2016)
  - Total: 232
- Time zone: UTC+3:30 (IRST)

Gil Mahalleh (Persian: گيل محله) (Note: Also romanized as Gīl Maḩalleh) is a village in Baladeh-ye Sharqi Rural District of Khorramabad District in Tonekabon County, Mazandaran province, Iran.

== Demographics ==
=== Population ===
At the time of the 2006 National Census, the village's population was 248 in 67 households, when it was in Baladeh Rural District. The following census in 2011 counted 221 people in 67 households. The 2016 census measured the population of the village as 232 people in 76 households.

In 2020, Gil Mahalleh was transferred to Baladeh-ye Sharqi Rural District created in the same district.
