= Gol-e Aliabad =

Village in Mazandaran province, Iran

Gol-e Aliabad Persian: گلعلي اباد
- Village
- Location within Iran
- Coordinates: 36°42′01″N 50°51′07″E
- Country: Iran
- Province: Mazandaran
- County: Tonekabon
- District: Kuhestan
- Rural District: Miyandaman

Population (2016)
  - Total: 598
- Time zone: UTC+3:30 (IRST)

Gol-e Aliabad (Persian: گلعلي اباد) (Note: Also romanized as Golalīābād and Gol-e ‘Alīābād) is a village in Miyandaman Rural District of Kuhestan District in Tonekabon County, Mazandaran province, Iran, serving as capital of the district.

== Demographics ==
=== Population ===
At the time of the 2006 National Census, the village's population was 712 in 204 households, when it was in Baladeh Rural District of Khorramabad District. The following census in 2011 counted 763 people in 271 households. The 2016 census measured the population of the village as 598 people in 230 households.

In 2020, Gol-e Aliabad was separated from the district in the formation of Kuhestan District and transferred to Miyandaman Rural District created in the same district.
