= Golestan Mahalleh =

Village in Mazandaran province, Iran

Golestan Mahalleh Persian: گلستان محله
- Village
- Location within Iran
- Coordinates: 36°39′07″N 50°44′56″E
- Country: Iran
- Province: Mazandaran
- County: Tonekabon
- District: Kuhestan
- Rural District: Do Hezar

Population (2016)
  - Total: 114
- Time zone: UTC+3:30 (IRST)

Golestan Mahalleh (Persian: گلستان محله) (Note: Also romanized as Golestān Maḩalleh; also known as Golestān) is a village in Do Hezar Rural District of Kuhestan District in Tonekabon County, Mazandaran province, Iran.

== Demographics ==
=== Population ===
At the time of the 2006 National Census, the village's population was 85 in 23 households, when it was in Khorramabad District. The following census in 2011 counted 109 people in 33 households. The 2016 census measured the population of the village as 114 people in 38 households.

In 2020, the rural district was separated from the district in the formation of Kuhestan District.
