= Shaneh Tarash Mahalleh =

Village in Mazandaran province, Iran

Shaneh Tarash Mahalleh Persian: شانه تراش محله
- Village
- Location within Iran
- Coordinates: 36°38′35″N 50°43′26″E
- Country: Iran
- Province: Mazandaran
- County: Tonekabon
- District: Khorramabad
- Rural District: Baladeh-ye Sharqi

Population (2016)
  - Total: 76
- Time zone: UTC+3:30 (IRST)

Shaneh Tarash Mahalleh (Persian: شانه تراش محله) (Note: Also romanized as Shāneh Tarāsh Maḩalleh; also known as Shāneh Tarāsh) is a village in Baladeh-ye Sharqi Rural District of Khorramabad District in Tonekabon County, Mazandaran province, Iran.

== Demographics ==
=== Population ===
At the time of the 2006 National Census, the village's population was 74 in 23 households, when it was in Do Hezar Rural District. The following census in 2011 counted 93 people in 38 households. The 2016 census measured the population of the village as 76 people in 25 households.

In 2020, Shaneh Tarash Mahalleh was transferred to Baladeh-ye Sharqi Rural District created in the same district.
