= Ash Mahalleh =

Village in Mazandaran province, Iran

Ash Mahalleh Persian: آش محله
- Village
- Location within Iran
- Coordinates: 36°35′42″N 50°50′04″E
- Country: Iran
- Province: Mazandaran
- County: Tonekabon
- District: Kuhestan
- Rural District: Seh Hezar

Population (2016)
  - Total: 50
- Time zone: UTC+3:30 (IRST)

Ash Mahalleh (Persian: آش محله) (Note: Also romanized as Āsh Maḩalleh) is a village in Seh Hezar Rural District of Kuhestan District in Tonekabon County, Mazandaran province, Iran.

== Demographics ==
=== Population ===
At the time of the 2006 National Census, the village's population was 36 in 11 households, when it was in Khorramabad District. The following census in 2011 counted 56 people in 22 households. The 2016 census measured the population of the village as 50 people in 21 households.

In 2020, the rural district was separated from the district in the formation of Kuhestan District.
