= Nusha =

Village in Mazandaran, Iran

Nusha نوشا
- village
- Location within Iran
- Coordinates: 36°36′39″N 50°38′04″E
- Country: Iran
- Province: Mazandaran
- County: Tonekabon
- Bakhsh: Khorramabad
- Rural District: Do Hezar

Population (2006)
  - Total: 77
- Time zone: UTC+3:30 (IRST)
  - Summer (DST): UTC+4:30 (IRDT)

Nusha (Persian: نوشا, also Romanized as Nūshā) is a village in Do Hezar Rural District, Khorramabad District, Tonekabon County, Mazandaran Province, Iran. At the 2006 census, its population was 77, in 25 families.
