= Mansurabad, Mazandaran =

Village in Mazandaran province, Iran

Mansurabad Persian: منصورآباد
- Village
- Location within Iran
- Coordinates: 36°48′06″N 50°52′12″E
- Country: Iran
- Province: Mazandaran
- County: Tonekabon
- District: Khorramabad
- Rural District: Baladeh-ye Sharqi

Population (2016)
  - Total: 979
- Time zone: UTC+3:30 (IRST)

Mansurabad (Persian: منصورآباد) (Note: Also romanized as Manşūrābād) is a village in Baladeh-ye Sharqi Rural District of Khorramabad District in Tonekabon County, Mazandaran province, Iran.

== Demographics ==
=== Population ===
At the time of the 2006 National Census, the village's population was 1,197 in 334 households, when it was in Baladeh Rural District. The following census in 2011 counted 1,186 people in 353 households. The 2016 census measured the population of the village as 979 people in 338 households.

In 2020, Mansurabad was transferred to Baladeh-ye Sharqi Rural District created in the same district.
