= Barseh =

Village in Mazandaran province, Iran

Barseh Persian: برسه
- Village
- Location within Iran
- Coordinates: 36°38′52″N 50°44′18″E
- Country: Iran
- Province: Mazandaran
- County: Tonekabon
- District: Kuhestan
- Rural District: Do Hezar

Population (2016)
  - Total: 454
- Time zone: UTC+3:30 (IRST)

Barseh (Persian: برسه) (Note: Also romanized as Baraseh) is a village in Do Hezar Rural District of Kuhestan District in Tonekabon County, Mazandaran province, Iran.

== Demographics ==
=== Population ===
At the time of the 2006 National Census, the village's population was 252 in 73 households, when it was in Khorramabad District. The following census in 2011 counted 353 people in 123 households. The 2016 census measured the population of the village as 454 people in 171 households, the most populous in its rural district.

In 2020, the rural district was separated from the district in the formation of Kuhestan District.
