= Behkaleh =

Village in Mazandaran province, Iran

Behkaleh Persian: بهكله
- Village
- Location within Iran
- Coordinates: 36°45′15″N 50°54′24″E
- Country: Iran
- Province: Mazandaran
- County: Tonekabon
- District: Khorramabad
- Rural District: Baladeh-ye Sharqi

Population (2016)
  - Total: 242
- Time zone: UTC+3:30 (IRST)

Behkaleh (Persian: بهكله) is a village in Baladeh-ye Sharqi Rural District of Khorramabad District in Tonekabon County, Mazandaran province, Iran.

== Demographics ==
=== Population ===
At the time of the 2006 National Census, the village's population was 222 in 64 households, when it was in Baladeh Rural District. The following census in 2011 counted 228 people in 72 households. The 2016 census measured the population of the village as 242 people in 82 households.

In 2020, Behkaleh was transferred to Baladeh-ye Sharqi Rural District created in the same district.
