= Esel Mahalleh =

Village in Mazandaran province, Iran

Esel Mahalleh Persian: عسل محله
- Village
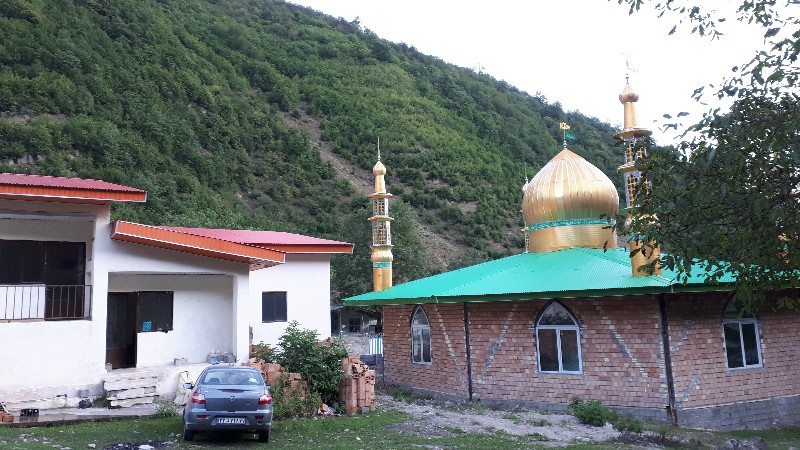
- Asal Mahalleh, 2019

- Location within Iran
- Coordinates: 36°36′14″N 50°43′50″E
- Country: Iran
- Province: Mazandaran
- County: Tonekabon
- District: Kuhestan
- Rural District: Do Hezar

Population (2016)
  - Total: 103
- Time zone: UTC+3:30 (IRST)

Esel Mahalleh (Persian: عسل محله) (Note: Also romanized as ‘Asal Maḩalleh, Esel Mahalleh, and ‘Esel Maḩalleh) is a village in Do Hezar Rural District of Kuhestan District in Tonekabon County, Mazandaran province, Iran.

== Demographics ==
=== Population ===
At the time of the 2006 National Census, the village's population was 34 in 11 households, when it was in Khorramabad District. The following census in 2011 counted 102 people in 56 households. The 2016 census measured the population of the village as 103 people in 40 households.

In 2020, the rural district was separated from the district in the formation of Kuhestan District.
