= Haratbar, Mazandaran =

Village in Mazandaran province, Iran

Haratbar Persian: هراتبر
- Village
- Location within Iran
- Coordinates: 36°45′07″N 50°50′09″E
- Country: Iran
- Province: Mazandaran
- County: Tonekabon
- District: Kuhestan
- Rural District: Miyandaman

Population (2016)
  - Total: 216
- Time zone: UTC+3:30 (IRST)

Haratbar (Persian: هراتبر) (Note: Also romanized as Harātbar) is a village in Miyandaman Rural District of Kuhestan District in Tonekabon County, Mazandaran province, Iran.

== Demographics ==
=== Population ===
At the time of the 2006 National Census, the village's population was 225 in 66 households, when it was in Baladeh Rural District of Khorramabad District. The following census in 2011 counted 231 people in 76 households. The 2016 census measured the population of the village as 216 people in 74 households.

In 2020, Haratbar was separated from the district in the formation of Kuhestan District and transferred to Miyandaman Rural District created in the same district.
