= Karat-e Kalleh =

Village in Mazandaran province, Iran

Karat-e Kalleh Persian: كرات كله
- Village
- Location within Iran
- Coordinates: 36°47′52″N 50°52′02″E
- Country: Iran
- Province: Mazandaran
- County: Tonekabon
- District: Khorramabad
- Rural District: Baladeh-ye Sharqi

Population (2016)
  - Total: 351
- Time zone: UTC+3:30 (IRST)

Karat-e Kalleh (Persian: كرات كله) (Note: Also romanized as Karāt-e Kalleh; also known as Karāt-e Kalleh-ye Bozorg) is a village in Baladeh-ye Sharqi Rural District of Khorramabad District in Tonekabon County, Mazandaran province, Iran.

== Demographics ==
=== Population ===
At the time of the 2006 National Census, the village's population was 215 in 64 households, when it was in Baladeh Rural District. The following census in 2011 counted 256 people in 82 households. The 2016 census measured the population of the village as 351 people in 116 households.

In 2020, Karat-e Kalleh was transferred to Baladeh-ye Sharqi Rural District created in the same district.
