= Miankuh Mahalleh =

Village in Mazandaran province, Iran

Miankuh Mahalleh Persian: ميانكوه محله
- Village
- Location within Iran
- Coordinates: 36°45′55″N 50°54′16″E
- Country: Iran
- Province: Mazandaran
- County: Tonekabon
- District: Khorramabad
- Rural District: Baladeh-ye Sharqi

Population (2016)
  - Total: 484
- Time zone: UTC+3:30 (IRST)

Miankuh Mahalleh (Persian: ميانكوه محله) (Note: Also romanized as Mīānkūh Maḩalleh; also known as Mīānkū Maḩalleh) is a village in Baladeh-ye Sharqi Rural District of Khorramabad District in Tonekabon County, Mazandaran province, Iran.

== Demographics ==
=== Population ===
At the time of the 2006 National Census, the village's population was 538 in 140 households, when it was in Baladeh Rural District. The following census in 2011 counted 447 people in 133 households. The 2016 census measured the population of the village as 484 people in 167 households.

In 2020, Miankuh Mahalleh was transferred to Baladeh-ye Sharqi Rural District created in the same district.
