= Palat Dar-e Bon =

Palat Dar-e Bon پلت‌داربن
- Village
- Location within Iran
- Coordinates: 36°38′17″N 50°44′24″E
- Country: Iran
- Province: Mazandaran
- County: Tonekabon
- Bakhsh: Khorramabad
- Rural District: Do Hezar

Population (2006)
  - Total: 58
- Time zone: UTC+3:30 (IRST)
  - Summer (DST): UTC+4:30 (IRDT)

Palat Dar-e Bon (Persian: پلت‌داربن, also Romanized as Palat Dārbon) is a village in Do Hezar Rural District, Khorramabad District, Tonekabon County, Mazandaran Province, Iran. At the 2006 census, its population was 58, in 17 families.
