= Shiraj Kheyl =

Village in Mazandaran province, Iran

Shiraj Kheyl Persian: شيرج خيل
- Village
- Location within Iran
- Coordinates: 36°45′26″N 50°53′11″E
- Country: Iran
- Province: Mazandaran
- County: Tonekabon
- District: Khorramabad
- Rural District: Baladeh-ye Sharqi

Population (2016)
  - Total: 153
- Time zone: UTC+3:30 (IRST)

Shiraj Kheyl (Persian: شيرج خيل) (Note: Also romanized as Shīraj Kheyl, Shirejkhil, and Shīrejkhīl) is a village in Baladeh-ye Sharqi Rural District of Khorramabad District in Tonekabon County, Mazandaran province, Iran.

== Demographics ==
=== Population ===
At the time of the 2006 National Census, the village's population was 129 in 36 households, when it was in Baladeh Rural District. The following census in 2011 counted 128 people in 32 households. The 2016 census measured the population of the village as 153 people in 52 households.

In 2020, Shiraj Kheyl was transferred to Baladeh-ye Sharqi Rural District created in the same district.
