= Palham Dasht =

Village in Mazandaran province, Iran

Palham Dasht Persian: پلهمدشت
- Village
- Location within Iran
- Coordinates: 36°47′21″N 50°53′26″E
- Country: Iran
- Province: Mazandaran
- County: Tonekabon
- District: Khorramabad
- Rural District: Baladeh-ye Sharqi

Population (2016)
  - Total: 175
- Time zone: UTC+3:30 (IRST)

Palham Dasht (Persian: پلهمدشت) is a village in Baladeh-ye Sharqi Rural District of Khorramabad District in Tonekabon County, Mazandaran province, Iran.

== Demographics ==
=== Population ===
At the time of the 2006 National Census, the village's population was 176 in 48 households, when it was in Baladeh Rural District. The following census in 2011 counted 196 people in 53 households. The 2016 census measured the population of the village as 175 people in 60 households.

In 2020, Palham Dasht was transferred to Baladeh-ye Sharqi Rural District created in the same district.

The village is located in Mazandaran Province, a region along the southern coast of the Caspian Sea known for its humid subtropical climate, dense forests, and mountainous terrain associated with the Alborz range.
