= Tazehabad, Tonekabon =

Village in Mazandaran province, Iran

Tazehabad Persian: تازه اباد
- Village
- Location within Iran
- Coordinates: 36°45′35″N 50°55′53″E
- Country: Iran
- Province: Mazandaran
- County: Tonekabon
- District: Khorramabad
- Rural District: Baladeh-ye Sharqi

Population (2016)
  - Total: 377
- Time zone: UTC+3:30 (IRST)

Tazehabad (Persian: تازه اباد) (Note: Also romanized as Tāzehābād) is a village in Baladeh-ye Sharqi Rural District of Khorramabad District in Tonekabon County, Mazandaran province, Iran.

== Demographics ==
=== Population ===
At the time of the 2006 National Census, the village's population was 370 in 105 households, when it was in Baladeh Rural District. The following census in 2011 counted 373 people in 115 households. The 2016 census measured the population of the village as 377 people in 128 households.

In 2020, Tazehabad was transferred to Baladeh-ye Sharqi Rural District created in the same district.
