= Ashkur Mahalleh =

Ashkur Mahalleh اشكورمحله
- Village
- Location within Iran
- Coordinates: 36°38′23″N 50°43′28″E
- Country: Iran
- Province: Mazandaran
- County: Tonekabon
- Bakhsh: Khorramabad
- Rural District: Do Hezar

Population (2006)
  - Total: 56
- Time zone: UTC+3:30 (IRST)
  - Summer (DST): UTC+4:30 (IRDT)

Ashkur Mahalleh (Persian: اشكورمحله, also Romanized as Ashkūr Maḩalleh) is a village in Do Hezar Rural District, Khorramabad District, Tonekabon County, Mazandaran Province, Iran. At the 2006 census, its population was 56, in 21 families.
