= Chareh Sar =

Chareh Sar چاره سر
- Village
- Location within Iran
- Coordinates: 36°38′27″N 50°43′40″E
- Country: Iran
- Province: Mazandaran
- County: Tonekabon
- Bakhsh: Khorramabad
- Rural District: Do Hezar

Population (2006)
  - Total: 47
- Time zone: UTC+3:30 (IRST)
  - Summer (DST): UTC+4:30 (IRDT)

Chareh Sar (Persian: چاره سر, also Romanized as Chāreh Sar; also known as Chahārsar) is a village in Do Hezar Rural District, Khorramabad District, Tonekabon County, Mazandaran Province, Iran. At the 2006 census, its population was 47, in 12 families.
