= Darjan =

Village in Mazandaran province, Iran

Darjan Persian: درجان
- Village
- Location within Iran
- Coordinates: 36°26′17″N 50°52′44″E
- Country: Iran
- Province: Mazandaran
- County: Tonekabon
- District: Kuhestan
- Rural District: Seh Hezar

Population (2016)
  - Total: 159
- Time zone: UTC+3:30 (IRST)

Darjan (Persian: درجان) (Note: Also romanized as Darjān) is a village in Seh Hezar Rural District of Kuhestan District in Tonekabon County, Mazandaran province, Iran.

== Demographics ==
=== Population ===
At the time of the 2006 National Census, the village's population was 96 in 27 households, when it was in Khorramabad District. The following census in 2011 counted 249 people in 82 households. The 2016 census measured the population of the village as 159 people in 53 households, the most populous in its rural district.

In 2020, the rural district was separated from the district in the formation of Kuhestan District.
