= Amirabad, Tonekabon =

Village in Mazandaran province, Iran

Amirabad Persian: اميراباد
- Village
- Location within Iran
- Coordinates: 36°45′03″N 50°54′53″E
- Country: Iran
- Province: Mazandaran
- County: Tonekabon
- District: Khorramabad
- Rural District: Baladeh-ye Sharqi

Population (2016)
  - Total: 419
- Time zone: UTC+3:30 (IRST)

Amirabad (Persian: اميراباد) (Note: Also romanized as Amīrābād) is a village in Baladeh-ye Sharqi Rural District of Khorramabad District in Tonekabon County, Mazandaran province, Iran.

== Demographics ==
=== Population ===
At the time of the 2006 National Census, the village's population was 387 in 113 households, when it was in Baladeh Rural District. The following census in 2011 counted 403 people in 128 households. The 2016 census measured the population of the village as 419 people in 152 households.

In 2020, Amirabad was transferred to Baladeh-ye Sharqi Rural District created in the same district.
