= Lashgarak =

Village in Mazandaran province, Iran

Lashgarak Persian: لشگرک
- Village
- Location within Iran
- Coordinates: 36°46′28″N 50°53′56″E
- Country: Iran
- Province: Mazandaran
- County: Tonekabon
- District: Khorramabad
- Rural District: Baladeh-ye Sharqi

Population (2016)
  - Total: 756
- Time zone: UTC+3:30 (IRST)

Lashgarak (Persian: لشگرک) is a village in Baladeh-ye Sharqi Rural District of Khorramabad District in Tonekabon County, Mazandaran province, Iran.

== Demographics ==
=== Population ===
At the time of the 2006 National Census, the village's population was 785 in 211 households, when it was in Baladeh Rural District. The following census in 2011 counted 818 people in 265 households. The 2016 census measured the population of the village as 756 people in 265 households.

In 2020, Lashgarak was transferred to Baladeh-ye Sharqi Rural District created in the same district.
