= Mazubon =

Mazubon (Persian: مازوبن) may refer to:

- Mazubon, Gilan
- Mazubon-e Olya, Mazandaran Province
- Mazubon-e Sofla, Mazandaran Province
