= Karaf, Tonekabon =

Village in Mazandaran province, Iran

Karaf Persian: كرف
- Village
- Location within Iran
- Coordinates: 36°47′57″N 50°51′50″E
- Country: Iran
- Province: Mazandaran
- County: Tonekabon
- District: Khorramabad
- Rural District: Baladeh-ye Sharqi

Population (2016)
  - Total: 455
- Time zone: UTC+3:30 (IRST)

Karaf (Persian: كرف) is a village in Baladeh-ye Sharqi Rural District of Khorramabad District in Tonekabon County, Mazandaran province, Iran.

== Demographics ==
=== Population ===
At the time of the 2006 National Census, the village's population was 373 in 99 households, when it was in Baladeh Rural District. The following census in 2011 counted 397 people in 121 households. The 2016 census measured the population of the village as 455 people in 146 households.

In 2020, Karaf was transferred to Baladeh-ye Sharqi Rural District created in the same district.
