= Maran, Mazandaran =

Village in Mazandaran province, Iran

Maran Persian: مران
- Village
- Location within Iran
- Coordinates: 36°26′46″N 50°50′18″E
- Country: Iran
- Province: Mazandaran
- County: Tonekabon
- District: Kuhestan
- Rural District: Seh Hezar

Population (2016)
  - Total: 156
- Time zone: UTC+3:30 (IRST)

Maran (Persian: مران) (Note: Also romanized as Marān) is a village in Seh Hezar Rural District of Kuhestan District in Tonekabon County, Mazandaran province, Iran.

== Demographics ==
=== Population ===
At the time of the 2006 National Census, the village's population was 152 in 51 households, when it was in Khorramabad District. The following census in 2011 counted 172 people in 56 households. The 2016 census measured the population of the village as 156 people in 53 households.

In 2020, the rural district was separated from the district in the formation of Kuhestan District.
