= Barsibur =

Village in Mazandaran province, Iran

Barsibur Persian: برسيبور
- Village
- Location within Iran
- Coordinates: 36°45′23″N 50°54′01″E
- Country: Iran
- Province: Mazandaran
- County: Tonekabon
- District: Khorramabad
- Rural District: Baladeh-ye Sharqi

Population (2016)
  - Total: 233
- Time zone: UTC+3:30 (IRST)

Barsibur (Persian: برسيبور) (Note: Also romanized as Barsībūr; also known as Barsabūr) is a village in Baladeh-ye Sharqi Rural District of Khorramabad District in Tonekabon County, Mazandaran province, Iran.

== Demographics ==
=== Population ===
At the time of the 2006 National Census, the village's population was 214 in 66 households, when it was in Baladeh Rural District. The following census in 2011 counted 224 people in 69 households. The 2016 census measured the population of the village as 233 people in 81 households.

In 2020, Barsibur was transferred to Baladeh-ye Sharqi Rural District created in the same district.
