= Arud, Iran =

Arud ارود
- Village
- Location within Iran
- Coordinates: 36°29′58″N 50°52′43″E
- Country: Iran
- Province: Mazandaran
- County: Tonekabon
- Bakhsh: Khorramabad
- Rural District: Seh Hezar

Population (2006)
  - Total: 30
- Time zone: UTC+3:30 (IRST)
  - Summer (DST): UTC+4:30 (IRDT)

Arud (Persian: ارود, also Romanized as Ārūd and Arood) is a village in Seh Hezar Rural District, Khorramabad District, Tonekabon County, Mazandaran Province, Iran. At the 2006 census, its population was 30, in 9 families.
