= Toshkun =

Village in Mazandaran province, Iran

Toshkun Persian: تشكون
- Village
- Location within Iran
- Coordinates: 36°44′35″N 50°53′06″E
- Country: Iran
- Province: Mazandaran
- County: Tonekabon
- District: Khorramabad
- Rural District: Baladeh

Population (2016)
  - Total: 456
- Time zone: UTC+3:30 (IRST)

Toshkun (Persian: تشكون) (Note: Also romanized as Toshkūn; also known as Towshkūn) is a village in Baladeh Rural District in Khorramabad District of Tonekabon County, Mazandaran province, Iran.

== Demographics ==
=== Population ===
At the time of the 2006 National Census, the village's population was 501 in 150 households. The following census in 2011 counted 490 people in 155 households. The 2016 census measured the population of the village as 456 people in 166 households.
