= Halu Kaleh, Mazandaran =

Village in Mazandaran province, Iran

Halu Kaleh Persian: هلوكله
- Village
- Location within Iran
- Coordinates: 36°37′08″N 50°44′15″E
- Country: Iran
- Province: Mazandaran
- County: Tonekabon
- District: Kuhestan
- Rural District: Do Hezar

Population (2016)
  - Total: 102
- Time zone: UTC+3:30 (IRST)

Halu Kaleh (Persian: هلوكله) (Note: Also romanized as Halū Kaleh; also known as Bālā Halū Kaleh and Halū Kalleh-ye Bālā) is a village in Do Hezar Rural District of Kuhestan District in Tonekabon County, Mazandaran province, Iran.

== Demographics ==
=== Population ===
At the time of the 2006 National Census, the village's population was 69 in 27 households, when it was in Khorramabad District. The following census in 2011 counted 134 people in 63 households. The 2016 census measured the population of the village as 102 people in 44 households.

In 2020, the rural district was separated from the district in the formation of Kuhestan District.
