= Miankuh Sadat =

Village in Mazandaran province, Iran

Miankuh Sadat Persian: ميانكوه سادات
- Village
- Location within Iran
- Country: Iran
- Province: Mazandaran
- County: Tonekabon
- District: Kuhestan
- Rural District: Do Hezar

Population (2016)
  - Total: 173
- Time zone: UTC+3:30 (IRST)

Miankuh Sadat (Persian: ميانكوه سادات) (Note: Also romanized as Mīānkūh Sādāt) is a village in Do Hezar Rural District of Kuhestan District in Tonekabon County, Mazandaran province, Iran.

== Demographics ==
=== Population ===
At the time of the 2006 National Census, the village's population was 66 in 20 households, when it was in Khorramabad District. The following census in 2011 counted 170 people in 64 households. The 2016 census measured the population of the village as 173 people in 75 households.

In 2020, the rural district was separated from the district in the formation of Kuhestan District.
