= Nematabad, Tonekabon =

Village in Mazandaran province, Iran

Nematabad Persian: نعمت اباد
- Village
- Location within Iran
- Coordinates: 36°44′51″N 50°55′46″E
- Country: Iran
- Province: Mazandaran
- County: Tonekabon
- District: Khorramabad
- Rural District: Baladeh-ye Sharqi

Population (2016)
  - Total: 2,597
- Time zone: UTC+3:30 (IRST)

Nematabad (Persian: نعمت اباد) (Note: Also romanized as Neʿmatābād) is a village in, and the capital of, Baladeh-ye Sharqi Rural District in Khorramabad District of Tonekabon County, Mazandaran province, Iran.

== Demographics ==
=== Population ===
At the time of the 2006 National Census, the village's population was 2,423 in 642 households, when it was in Baladeh Rural District. The following census in 2011 counted 2,486 people in 778 households. The 2016 census measured the population of the village as 2,597 people in 895 households, the most populous in its rural district.

In 2020, Nematabad was transferred to Baladeh-ye Sharqi Rural District created in the same district.
