= Shiraj Mahalleh-ye Bozorg =

Village in Mazandaran province, Iran

Shiraj Mahalleh-ye Bozorg Persian: شيرج محله بزرگ
- Village
- Location within Iran
- Coordinates: 36°46′22″N 50°55′02″E
- Country: Iran
- Province: Mazandaran
- County: Tonekabon
- District: Khorramabad
- Rural District: Baladeh-ye Sharqi

Population (2016)
  - Total: 348
- Time zone: UTC+3:30 (IRST)

Shiraj Mahalleh-ye Bozorg (Persian: شيرج محله بزرگ) (Note: Also romanized as Shīraj Maḩalleh-ye Bozorg) is a village in Baladeh-ye Sharqi Rural District of Khorramabad District in Tonekabon County, Mazandaran province, Iran.

== Demographics ==
=== Population ===
At the time of the 2006 National Census, the village's population was 372 in 113 households, when it was in Baladeh Rural District. The following census in 2011 counted 332 people in 100 households. The 2016 census measured the population of the village as 348 people in 117 households.

In 2020, Shiraj Mahalleh-ye Bozorg was transferred to Baladeh-ye Sharqi Rural District created in the same district.
