= Karajub Konar =

Village in Mazandaran province, Iran

Karajub Konar Persian: كراجوبكنار
- Village
- Location within Iran
- Coordinates: 36°45′48″N 50°51′09″E
- Country: Iran
- Province: Mazandaran
- County: Tonekabon
- District: Khorramabad
- Rural District: Baladeh

Population (2016)
  - Total: 614
- Time zone: UTC+3:30 (IRST)

Karajub Konar (Persian: كراجوبكنار) (Note: Also romanized as Karājūb Konār) is a village in Baladeh Rural District in Khorramabad District of Tonekabon County, Mazandaran province, Iran.

== Demographics ==
=== Population ===
At the time of the 2006 National Census, the village's population was 552 in 151 households. The following census in 2011 counted 589 people in 178 households. The 2016 census measured the population of the village as 614 people in 197 households.
