= Shahrestanak =

Shahrestanak or Shahristanak (Persian: شهرستانك) may refer to:

- Shahrestanak, Alborz
- Shahrestanak, Mazandaran
- Shahrestanak, Qazvin
- Shahrestanak, Joghatai, Razavi Khorasan Province
- Shahrestanak, Torbat-e Jam, Razavi Khorasan Province
- Shahrestanak, South Khorasan
- Shahrestanak, Tehran
- Shahrestanak, Zanjan

== See also ==
- Shahrestan (disambiguation)
