= Yuj =

Yuj may refer to:

- Yuj, Mazandaran, a village in Iran
- Yuj, Qazvin, also a village in Iran
- Karkar language, spoken in Papua New Guinea, by ISO 639 code
