= Pain Eshtuj =

Village in Mazandaran province, Iran

Pain Eshtuj Persian: پائين اشتوج
- Village
- Location within Iran
- Coordinates: 36°38′51″N 50°46′08″E
- Country: Iran
- Province: Mazandaran
- County: Tonekabon
- District: Kuhestan
- Rural District: Do Hezar

Population (2016)
  - Total: 110
- Time zone: UTC+3:30 (IRST)

Pain Eshtuj (Persian: پائين اشتوج) (Note: Also romanized as Pā’īn Eshtūj; also known as Eshtūj, Oshtūj, and Pā’īn Eshtūkh) is a village in Do Hezar Rural District of Kuhestan District in Tonekabon County, Mazandaran province, Iran.

== Demographics ==
=== Population ===
At the time of the 2006 National Census, the village's population was 53 in 22 households, when it was in Khorramabad District. The following census in 2011 counted 50 people in 25 households. The 2016 census measured the population of the village as 110 people in 45 households.

In 2020, the rural district was separated from the district in the formation of Kuhestan District.
