= Tusa Kalleh =

Village in Mazandaran province, Iran

Tusa Kalleh Persian: توساكله
- Village
- Location within Iran
- Coordinates: 36°44′26″N 50°53′56″E
- Country: Iran
- Province: Mazandaran
- County: Tonekabon
- District: Khorramabad
- Rural District: Baladeh

Population (2016)
  - Total: 361
- Time zone: UTC+3:30 (IRST)

Tusa Kalleh (Persian: توساكله) (Note: Also romanized as Tūsā Kalleh) is a village in Baladeh Rural District in Khorramabad District of Tonekabon County, Mazandaran province, Iran.

== Demographics ==
=== Population ===
At the time of the 2006 National Census, the village's population was 464 in 122 households. The following census in 2011 counted 361 people in 118 households. The 2016 census measured the population of the village as 361 people in 132 households.
