= Sangar Deh =

Village in Mazandaran province, Iran

Sangar Deh Persian: سنگرده
- Village
- Location within Iran
- Coordinates: 36°46′40″N 50°50′15″E
- Country: Iran
- Province: Mazandaran
- County: Tonekabon
- District: Khorramabad
- Rural District: Baladeh

Population (2016)
  - Total: 272
- Time zone: UTC+3:30 (IRST)

Sangar Deh (Persian: سنگرده) (Note: Also known as Sangar Māl) is a village in Baladeh Rural District in Khorramabad District of Tonekabon County, Mazandaran province, Iran.

== Demographics ==
=== Population ===
At the time of the 2006 National Census, the village's population was 312 in 92 households. The following census in 2011 counted 274 people in 86 households. The 2016 census measured the population of the village as 272 people in 89 households.
