= Mazubon-e Sofla =

Village in Mazandaran province, Iran

Mazubon-e Sofla Persian: مازوبن سفلي
- Village
- Location within Iran
- Coordinates: 36°44′05″N 50°56′43″E
- Country: Iran
- Province: Mazandaran
- County: Tonekabon
- District: Khorramabad
- Rural District: Baladeh-ye Sharqi

Population (2016)
  - Total: 1,095
- Time zone: UTC+3:30 (IRST)

Mazubon-e Sofla (Persian: مازوبن سفلي) (Note: Also romanized as Māzūbon-e Soflá) is a village in Baladeh-ye Sharqi Rural District of Khorramabad District in Tonekabon County, Mazandaran province, Iran.

== Demographics ==
=== Population ===
At the time of the 2006 National Census, the village's population was 1,108 in 296 households, when it was in Baladeh Rural District. The following census in 2011 counted 1,116 people in 360 households. The 2016 census measured the population of the village as 1,095 people in 383 households.

In 2020, Mazubon-e Sofla was transferred to Baladeh-ye Sharqi Rural District created in the same district.
