= Arud =

Arud may refer to:

- Arabic prosody
- Arud, Iran, in Mazandaran Province, Iran
- Arud, Tehran, Iran
