= Shirvan Mahalleh =

Village in Mazandaran province, Iran

Shirvan Mahalleh Persian: شيروان محله
- Village
- Location within Iran
- Coordinates: 36°46′12″N 50°50′53″E
- Country: Iran
- Province: Mazandaran
- County: Tonekabon
- District: Khorramabad
- Rural District: Baladeh

Population (2016)
  - Total: 219
- Time zone: UTC+3:30 (IRST)

Shirvan Mahalleh (Persian: شيروان محله) (Note: Also romanized as Shīrvān Maḩalleh) is a village in Baladeh Rural District in Khorramabad District of Tonekabon County, Mazandaran province, Iran.

== Demographics ==
=== Population ===
At the time of the 2006 National Census, the village's population was 250 in 72 households. The following census in 2011 counted 235 people in 74 households. The 2016 census measured the population of the village as 219 people in 75 households.
