= Ab Kuleh Sar-e Bozorg =

Village in Mazandaran province, Iran

Ab Kuleh Sar-e Bozorg Persian: آبكوله سربزرگ
- Village
- Location within Iran
- Coordinates: 36°47′04″N 50°53′44″E
- Country: Iran
- Province: Mazandaran
- County: Tonekabon
- District: Khorramabad
- Rural District: Baladeh-ye Sharqi

Population (2016)
  - Total: 706
- Time zone: UTC+3:30 (IRST)

Ab Kuleh Sar-e Bozorg (Persian: آبكوله سربزرگ) (Note: Also romanized as Āb Kūleh Sar-e Bozorg; also known as Āb Kalleh Sar-e Bozorg and Ābkaleh Sar) is a village in Baladeh-ye Sharqi Rural District of Khorramabad District in Tonekabon County, Mazandaran province, Iran.

== Demographics ==
=== Population ===
At the time of the 2006 National Census, the village's population was 846 in 220 households, when it was in Baladeh Rural District. The following census in 2011 counted 777 people in 229 households. The 2016 census measured the population of the village as 706 people in 227 households.

In 2020, Ab Kuleh Sar-e Bozorg was transferred to Baladeh-ye Sharqi Rural District created in the same district.
