= Kardegar Mahalleh =

Kardegar Mahalleh or Kardgar Mahalleh or Kard Gar Mahalleh (Persian: كاردگرمحله) may refer to:

- Kardegar Mahalleh, Fereydunkenar
- Kardegar Mahalleh, Tonekabon
