= Aghuz Kaleh, Mazandaran =

Village in Mazandaran province, Iran

Aghuz Kaleh Persian: اغوزكله
- Village
- Location within Iran
- Coordinates: 36°46′08″N 50°50′06″E
- Country: Iran
- Province: Mazandaran
- County: Tonekabon
- District: Khorramabad
- Rural District: Baladeh

Population (2016)
  - Total: 427
- Time zone: UTC+3:30 (IRST)

Aghuz Kaleh (Persian: اغوزكله) (Note: Also romanized as Āghūz Kaleh) is a village in Baladeh Rural District in Khorramabad District of Tonekabon County, Mazandaran province, Iran.

== Demographics ==
=== Population ===
At the time of the 2006 National Census, the village's population was 494 in 140 households. The following census in 2011 counted 516 people in 163 households. The 2016 census measured the population of the village as 427 people in 154 households.
