= Siavarz =

Village in Mazandaran province, Iran

Siavarz Persian: سياورز
- Village
- Location within Iran
- Coordinates: 36°44′55″N 50°52′01″E
- Country: Iran
- Province: Mazandaran
- County: Tonekabon
- District: Khorramabad
- Rural District: Baladeh

Population (2016)
  - Total: 903
- Time zone: UTC+3:30 (IRST)

Siavarz (Persian: سياورز) (Note: Also romanized as Sīāvarz and Sīya Varaz; also known as Siyah Varz) is a village in Baladeh Rural District in Khorramabad District of Tonekabon County, Mazandaran province, Iran.

== Demographics ==
=== Population ===
At the time of the 2006 National Census, the village's population was 893 in 274 households. The following census in 2011 counted 881 people in 310 households. The 2016 census measured the population of the village as 903 people in 343 households.
