= Bala Eshtuj =

Village in Mazandaran province, Iran

Bala Eshtuj Persian: بالااشتوج
- Village
- Location within Iran
- Coordinates: 36°38′29″N 50°45′27″E
- Country: Iran
- Province: Mazandaran
- County: Tonekabon
- District: Kuhestan
- Rural District: Do Hezar

Population (2016)
  - Total: 138
- Time zone: UTC+3:30 (IRST)

Bala Eshtuj (Persian: بالااشتوج) (Note: Also romanized as Bālā Eshtūj; also known as Bālā Eshtūkh, Eshtūj, and Oshtūj) is a village in Do Hezar Rural District of Kuhestan District in Tonekabon County, Mazandaran province, Iran.

== Demographics ==
=== Population ===
At the time of the 2006 National Census, the village's population was 119 in 36 households, when it was in Khorramabad District. The following census in 2011 counted 225 people in 79 households. The 2016 census measured the population of the village as 138 people in 49 households.

In 2020, the rural district was separated from the district in the formation of Kuhestan District.
