= Ab Kuleh Sar =

Ab Kuleh Sar (Persian: ابكوله سر), also rendered as Ab Kalleh Sar or Abkaleh Sar, may refer to:

- Ab Kuleh Sar-e Bozorg
- Ab Kuleh Sar-e Kuchak
