= Yuj, Mazandaran =

Village in Mazandaran province, Iran

Yuj Persian: يوج
- Village
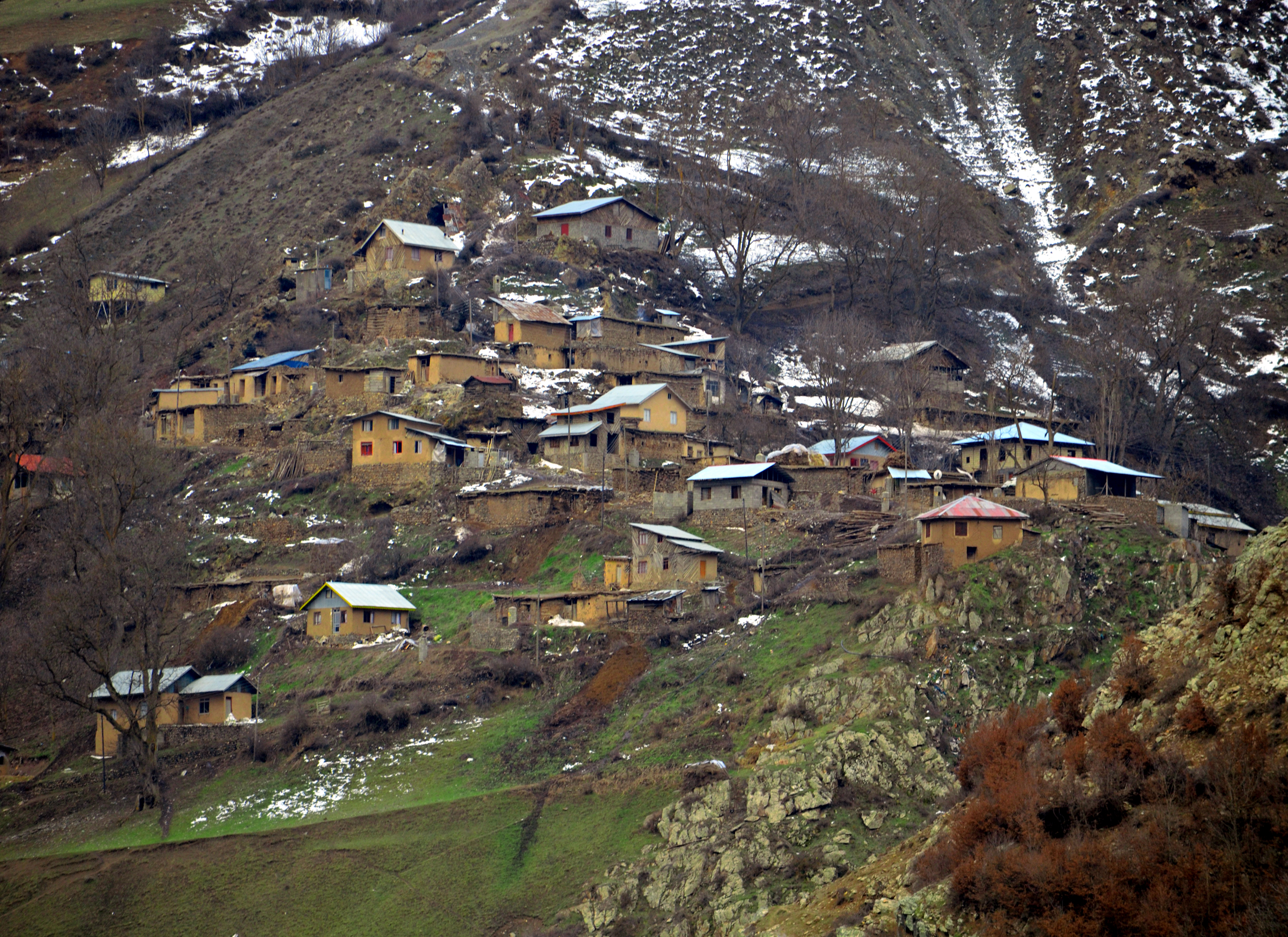
- The village of Yuj in winter

- Location within Iran
- Coordinates: 36°28′38″N 50°51′05″E
- Country: Iran
- Province: Mazandaran
- County: Tonekabon
- District: Kuhestan
- Rural District: Seh Hezar

Population (2016)
  - Total: 77
- Time zone: UTC+3:30 (IRST)

Yuj (Persian: يوج) (Note: Also romanized as Yūj) is a village in, and the capital of, Seh Hezar Rural District in Kuhestan District of Tonekabon County, Mazandaran province, Iran.

== Demographics ==
=== Population ===
At the time of the 2006 National Census, the village's population was 61 in 15 households, when it was in Khorramabad District. The following census in 2011 counted 81 people in 25 households. The 2016 census measured the population of the village as 77 people in 28 households.

In 2020, the rural district was separated from the district in the formation of Kuhestan District.
