= Balus =

Balus may refer to:

- Balus, Iran
- Balus River, in Romania
- Alexander Balus
- Decebalus, the last king of Dacia
