= Mian Kuh, Mazandaran =

Village in Mazandaran province, Iran

Mian Kuh Persian: ميانكوه
- Village
- Location within Iran
- Coordinates: 36°37′53″N 50°43′46″E
- Country: Iran
- Province: Mazandaran
- County: Tonekabon
- District: Kuhestan
- Rural District: Do Hezar

Population (2016)
  - Total: 147
- Time zone: UTC+3:30 (IRST)

Mian Kuh (Persian: ميانكوه) (Note: Also romanized as Mīān Kūh; also known as Ḩoseynābād) is a village in Do Hezar Rural District of Kuhestan District in Tonekabon County, Mazandaran province, Iran.

== Demographics ==
=== Population ===
At the time of the 2006 National Census, the village's population was 93 in 35 households, when it was in Khorramabad District. The following census in 2011 counted 260 people in 106 households. The 2016 census measured the population of the village as 147 people in 61 households.

In 2020, the rural district was separated from the district in the formation of Kuhestan District.
