= Zamin Bon =

Village in Mazandaran province, Iran

Zamin Bon Persian: زمين بن
- Village
- Country: Iran
- Province: Mazandaran
- County: Tonekabon
- District: Khorramabad
- Rural District: Baladeh

Population (2016)
  - Total: 137
- Time zone: UTC+3:30 (IRST)

Zamin Bon (Persian: زمين بن) (Note: Also romanized as Zamīn Bon) is a village in Baladeh Rural District in Khorramabad District of Tonekabon County, Mazandaran province, Iran.

== Demographics ==
=== Population ===
At the time of the 2006 National Census, the village's population was 58 in 16 households. The following census in 2011 counted 147 people in 50 households. The 2016 census measured the population of the village as 137 people in 43 households.
