= Shiraj Mahalleh =

Shiraj Mahalleh (Persian: شيرج محله) may refer to:

- Shiraj Mahalleh-ye Bozorg
- Shiraj Mahalleh-ye Kuchak
