= Mian Sara, Mazandaran =

Village in Mazandaran province, Iran

Mian Sara Persian: ميانسرا
- Village
- Location within Iran
- Coordinates: 36°44′40″N 50°52′38″E
- Country: Iran
- Province: Mazandaran
- County: Tonekabon
- District: Khorramabad
- Rural District: Baladeh

Population (2016)
  - Total: 238
- Time zone: UTC+3:30 (IRST)

Mian Sara (Persian: ميانسرا) (Note: Also romanized as Mīān Sarā) is a village in Baladeh Rural District in Khorramabad District of Tonekabon County, Mazandaran province, Iran.

== Demographics ==
=== Population ===
At the time of the 2006 National Census, the village's population was 251 in 70 households. The following census in 2011 counted 233 people in 70 households. The 2016 census measured the population of the village as 238 people in 84 households.
