= Halu Kaleh =

Halu Kaleh or Halu Kalleh (Persian: هلوكله) may refer to:

- Halu Kaleh, Gilan
- Halu Kaleh, Mazandaran
