= Zuiderdijk =

Zuiderdijk may refer to:

- SS Zuiderdijk, a cargo ship that served in the Holland-America Line 1912-1918 and 1919–1923, then in service as SS Misty Law, and which disappeared from mercantile records in the early 1930s.
- USS Zuiderdijk (ID-2724), a cargo ship that served in the United States Navy from 1918 to 1919.
