= Balas =

Village in Mazandaran province, Iran

Balas Persian: بالاس
- Village
- Location within Iran
- Coordinates: 36°39′14″N 50°45′36″E
- Country: Iran
- Province: Mazandaran
- County: Tonekabon
- District: Kuhestan
- Rural District: Do Hezar

Population (2016)
  - Total: 258
- Time zone: UTC+3:30 (IRST)

Balas (Persian: بالاس) (Note: Also romanized as Balās; also known as Balūs) is a village in Do Hezar Rural District of Kuhestan District in Tonekabon County, Mazandaran province, Iran.

== Demographics ==
=== Population ===
At the time of the 2006 National Census, the village's population was 108 in 36 households, when it was in Khorramabad District. The following census in 2011 counted 277 people in 88 households. The 2016 census measured the population of the village as 258 people in 87 households.

In 2020, the rural district was separated from the district in the formation of Kuhestan District.
