= Talu Sarak =

Village in Mazandaran province, Iran

Talu Sarak Persian: تلوسرك
- Village
- Location within Iran
- Coordinates: 36°44′48″N 50°52′15″E
- Country: Iran
- Province: Mazandaran
- County: Tonekabon
- District: Khorramabad
- Rural District: Baladeh

Population (2016)
  - Total: 90
- Time zone: UTC+3:30 (IRST)

Talu Sarak (Persian: تلوسرك) (Note: Also romanized as Talū Sarak) is a village in Baladeh Rural District in Khorramabad District of Tonekabon County, Mazandaran province, Iran.

== Demographics ==
=== Population ===
At the time of the 2006 National Census, the village's population was 104 in 29 households. The following census in 2011 counted 100 people in 37 households. The 2016 census measured the population of the village as 90 people in 35 households.
