= Marzak =

Village in Mazandaran province, Iran

Marzak Persian: مزرک
- Village
- Location within Iran
- Coordinates: 36°47′09″N 50°50′35″E
- Country: Iran
- Province: Mazandaran
- County: Tonekabon
- District: Khorramabad
- Rural District: Baladeh

Population (2016)
  - Total: 649
- Time zone: UTC+3:30 (IRST)

Marzak (Persian: مرزك) is a village in Baladeh Rural District in Khorramabad District of Tonekabon County, Mazandaran province, Iran.

== Demographics ==
=== Population ===
At the time of the 2006 National Census, the village's population was 664 in 184 households. The following census in 2011 counted 717 people in 208 households. The 2016 census measured the population of the village as 649 people in 221 households.
