= Shahrestan =

Shahrestan or Shahristan (Persian: شهرستان) may refer to:

== Places ==
- Counties of Iran ("Shahrestan" in Persian), second order administrative divisions of Iran
- Shahristan District, Afghanistan (alternate spelling: Shahrestan)
- Shahrestan, Fasa, Fars Province, Iran
- Shahrestan, Khonj, Fars Province, Iran
- Shahrestan, Khoshk-e Bijar, Rasht County, Gilan Province
- Shahrestan, Sangar, Rasht County, Gilan Province
- Shahrestan, Mazandaran, Iran
- Shahrestan, Tonekabon, Mazandaran Province, Iran
- Shahrestan, Qazvin, Iran
- Shahrestan, Tehran, Iran
- Shahrestan, West Azerbaijan, Iran
- Shahrestan-e Olya, Iran
- Shahrestan-e Sofla, Iran

== Other ==
- Shahristan (city area)

== See also ==
- Shahrestanak (disambiguation)
