= Estakhr Sar, Tonekabon =

Village in Mazandaran province, Iran

Estakhr Sar Persian: استخرسر
- Village
- Location within Iran
- Coordinates: 36°45′48″N 50°51′47″E
- Country: Iran
- Province: Mazandaran
- County: Tonekabon
- District: Khorramabad
- Rural District: Baladeh

Population (2016)
  - Total: 488
- Time zone: UTC+3:30 (IRST)

Estakhr Sar (Persian: استخرسر) is a village in Baladeh Rural District in Khorramabad District of Tonekabon County, Mazandaran province, Iran.

== Demographics ==
=== Population ===
At the time of the 2006 National Census, the village's population was 334 in 94 households. The following census in 2011 counted 397 people in 125 households. The 2016 census measured the population of the village as 488 people in 169 households.
