= Kal-e Lat =

Village in Mazandaran province, Iran

Kal-e Lat Persian: كل لات
- Village
- Country: Iran
- Province: Mazandaran
- County: Tonekabon
- District: Khorramabad
- Rural District: Baladeh

Population (2016)
  - Total: 53
- Time zone: UTC+3:30 (IRST)

Kal-e Lat (Persian: كل لات) (Note: Also romanized as Kal-e Lāt) is a village in Baladeh Rural District in Khorramabad District of Tonekabon County, Mazandaran province, Iran.

== Demographics ==
=== Population ===
At the time of the 2006 National Census, the village's population was 59 in 20 households. The following census in 2011 counted 59 people in 21 households. The 2016 census measured the population of the village as 53 people in 20 households.
