= Qaleh Gardan, Mazandaran =

Village in Mazandaran province, Iran

Qaleh Gardan Persian: قلعه گردن
- Village
- Location within Iran
- Coordinates: 36°45′34″N 50°50′51″E
- Country: Iran
- Province: Mazandaran
- County: Tonekabon
- District: Khorramabad
- Rural District: Baladeh

Population (2016)
  - Total: 1,318
- Time zone: UTC+3:30 (IRST)

Qaleh Gardan (Persian: قلعه گردن) (Note: Also romanized as Qal‘eh Gardan; also known as Baladeh) is a village in, and the capital of, Baladeh Rural District in Khorramabad District of Tonekabon County, Mazandaran province, Iran. The previous capital of the rural district was the village of Baladeh.

== Demographics ==
=== Population ===
At the time of the 2006 National Census, the village's population was 1,387 in 378 households. The following census in 2011 counted 1,356 people in 421 households. The 2016 census measured the population of the village as 1,318 people in 459 households.
