= Shahrestanak, Mazandaran =

Village in Mazandaran province, Iran

Shahrestanak Persian: شهرستانك
- Village
- Location within Iran
- Coordinates: 36°26′22″N 50°52′24″E
- Country: Iran
- Province: Mazandaran
- County: Tonekabon
- District: Kuhestan
- Rural District: Seh Hezar

Population (2016)
  - Total: 50
- Time zone: UTC+3:30 (IRST)

Shahrestanak (Persian: شهرستانك) (Note: Also romanized as Shahrestānak; also known as Shahrestān) is a village in Seh Hezar Rural District of Kuhestan District in Tonekabon County, Mazandaran province, Iran.

== Demographics ==
=== Population ===
At the time of the 2006 National Census, the village's population was 75 in 21 households, when it was in Khorramabad District. The following census in 2011 counted 183 people in 53 households. The 2016 census measured the population of the village as 50 people in 22 households.

In 2020, the rural district was separated from the district in the formation of Kuhestan District.
