= Kardegar Mahalleh, Tonekabon =

Village in Mazandaran province, Iran

Kardegar Mahalleh Persian: كاردگرمحله
- Village
- Location within Iran
- Coordinates: 36°45′42″N 50°52′43″E
- Country: Iran
- Province: Mazandaran
- County: Tonekabon
- District: Khorramabad
- Rural District: Baladeh

Population (2016)
  - Total: 1,308
- Time zone: UTC+3:30 (IRST)

Kardegar Mahalleh (Persian: كاردگرمحله) (Note: Also romanized as Kārdgar Maḩalleh and Kārdegar Maḩalleh; also known as Kārgar Maḩalleh) is a village in Baladeh Rural District in Khorramabad District of Tonekabon County, Mazandaran province, Iran.

== Demographics ==
=== Population ===
At the time of the 2006 National Census, the village's population was 1,312 in 364 households. The following census in 2011 counted 1,206 people in 374 households. The 2016 census measured the population of the village as 1,308 people in 445 households.
