= USS Zuiderdijk =

Cargo steamship that was briefly in the United States Navy

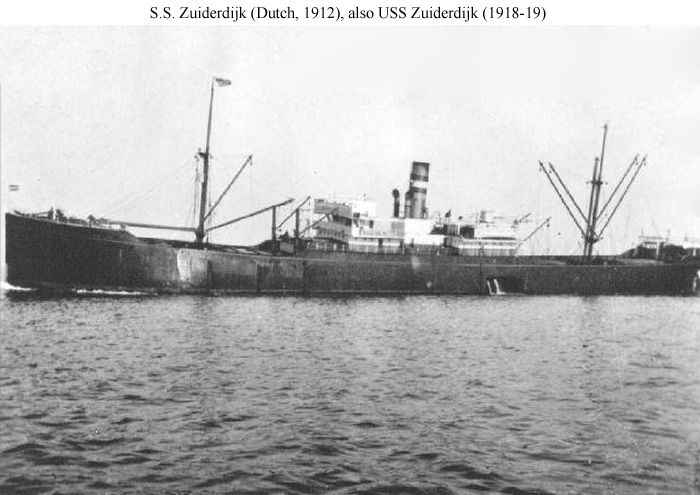
- The ship as Zuiderdijk

History
- Name: 1912: Sharistan; 1912: Zuiderdijk; 1923: Misty Law; 1931: Edera; 1956: Frin; 1956 Mahfuz
- Owner: 1912: Anglo-Algerian SS Co; 1912: Holland America Line; 1923: The Law Shipping Co; 1931: Achille Lauro; 1949: F Pittaluga fu Giacomo; 1956: Cia Mar Caribe SA; 1956: Linea Adriatico Golfo Persa
- Operator: 1912: F Strick & Co; 1918: (United States) US Navy; 1923: T Law & Co; 1956: CA Petrousis
- Port of registry: 1912 (Netherlands) Rotterdam; 1923 (United Kingdom) Glasgow; 1931 (Kingdom of Italy) Naples; 1949 (Italy) Genoa; 1956 (Costa Rica) Puerto Limón
- Builder: Wm Gray & Co, West Hartlepool
- Yard number: 805
- Launched: 17 June 1912
- Completed: July 1912
- Acquired: by US government, 21 March 1918
- Commissioned: into US Navy, 23 March 1918
- Decommissioned: from US Navy, 21 July 1919
- Identification: 1912: code letters QDKB; 1918: ID number ID-2724; 1923: UK official number 128934; 1923: code letters KNJQ; 1930: call sign GJRL; 1931: code letters NLFP; 1934: call sign ICPS
- Fate: Scrapped in 1957

General characteristics
- Type: cargo ship
- Tonnage: 5,208 GRT, 3,257 NRT, 8,075 DWT
- Length: 412.0 ft (125.6 m) overall; 400.0 ft (121.9 m) registered
- Beam: 53.5 ft (16.3 m)
- Draught: 24 ft 1 in (7.34 m)
- Depth: 27.1 ft (8.3 m)
- Decks: 2
- Installed power: 602 NHP, 3,600 ihp
- Propulsion: 1 × screw; 1 × triple-expansion engine
- Speed: 12 knots (22 km/h)
- Capacity: 384,000 cubic feet (10,874 m^{3}) grain, 356,000 cubic feet (10,081 m^{3}) bale
- Complement: in US Navy, 124
- Armament: in US Navy: 1 × 4-inch (100 mm) gun
- Notes: sister ships: Arabistan (1912), Arabistan (1913)

USS Zuiderdijk was a cargo ship that was built in England in 1912 as Sharistan, but was renamed Zuiderdijk later that year when she changed owners. She was USS Zuiderdijk with the Naval Registry Identification Number ID-2724, from 1918 until 1919. She was renamed Misty Law in 1923, Edera in 1931, Frin in 1956 and Mahfuz later in 1956.

As USS Zuiderdijk she made five return voyages across the North Atlantic and back: three before the Armistice of 11 November 1918, and two afterward. She also made two Caribbean voyages to and from the Panama Canal, one of which took her to Ecuador.

Her total career as a cargo ship lasted 45 years. She passed through Welsh, Dutch, Scots, Italian and Greek management, and was registered in the Netherlands, United Kingdom, Italy and Costa Rica. She survived both World Wars, and she was scrapped in Italy in 1957.

== Sharistan ==
In 1912 and 1913 William Gray & Company of West Hartlepool, England, built three 400-foot (122 m) sister ships for the shipowner Frank C Strick & Co. Yard number 802 was launched in March 1912, and completed that May, and named Arabistan. Yard number 805 was launched on 17 June 1912, completed that July, and named Sharistan. But in 1913 Strick sold Arabistan to the British India Steam Navigation Company (BI), who renamed her Chindwara. Yard number 827 was launched in July 1913, completed that August, and also named Arabistan. British India SN Co bought her, too, and renamed her Chinkoa.

The three ships had almost identical measurements. Sharistan's length overall was 412.0 ft (125.6 m) and her registered length was 400.0 ft (121.9 m). Her beam was 53.5 ft (16.3 m) and her depth was 27.1 ft (8.3 m). Her tonnages were 5,208 GRT, 3,257 NRT and 8,075 DWT. Her capacities were 384,000 cubic feet (10,874 m^{3}) for grain, or 356,000 cubic feet (10,081 m^{3}) for baled cargo.

Sharistan had a single screw, driven by a three-cylinder triple-expansion steam engine built by William Gray's Central Marine Engineering Works in West Hartlepool. It was rated at 602 NHP or 3,600 ihp, and gave her a speed of 12 knots (22 km/h).

Between 1906 and 1965, Strick Line had several ships built with the Persian name Shahristan. In 1912 and 1913 three ships in succession, all launched for Strick as Shahristan, were sold before completion to BI, who renamed them all. This is separate from yard number 805, which uniquely was recorded as "Sharistan", without the second "h".

== Zuiderdijk ==
Around the time Sharistan was completed, Holland America Line (NASM) bought her and renamed her Zuiderdijk. She was registered in Rotterdam, and her code letters were QDKB. By 1918 Zuiderdijk was the Port of San Juan, Puerto Rico, sheltering from the Imperial German Navy's unrestricted submarine warfare.

== USS Zuiderdijk ==
On 21 March 1918 the United States Customs Service seized 89 Dutch ships in US ports under angary. 31 of them were commissioned into the US Navy. Zuiderdijk was commissioned on 23 March as USS Zuiderdijk, with the Naval Registry Identification Number ID-2724.

Zuiderdijk was assigned to the Naval Overseas Transportation Service. After preliminary refitting she went to Cristóbal, Colón, where she was in port for nearly a month. She loaded cargo from the Panama Canal Railway, and left port on 25 April. On 4 May she reached New York, where she discharged her cargo and loaded United States Army supplies for the American Expeditionary Forces. On 17 May she left New York as part of a convoy, and on 1 June she reached Le Havre in France, where she discharged her cargo. On 12 June she left Le Havre in ballast, and on 2 July she reached New York.

Zuiderdijk spent 11 days being repaired and loading cargo. On 13 July she left New York, and on 28 July she reached Gironde. The next day she entered Saint-Nazaire, where she discharged her cargo, and loaded cargo for her return voyage. She left St-Nazaire on 18 August and reached New York on 31 August. There she was dry docked, bunkered, and loaded cargo.

On 14 September Zuiderdijk left New York, and on 29 September she reached Brest. The next day she reached Verdon, where she discharged her cargo. On 15 October she left Verdon in ballast, and on 28 October she reached New York.

After the Armistice, Zuiderdijk continued naval service. On 12 November she laft New York, and on 25 November she reached Quiberon, where she discharged her cargo. She loaded 700 tons of rails as ballast, plus 500 tons of general cargo. On 6 December she left France and on 24 September she reached New York, where she received minor repairs.

Zuiderdijk went from New York to Norfolk, Virginia, where she loaded cargo for the United States Shipping Board. Late in January 1919 she left Norfolk, and went via the Panama Canal to Guayaquil, Ecuador. There she loaded a cargo of cocoa, and on 12 February she left Guayaquil for the Panama Canal. On 12 March she reached Saint Thomas, U.S. Virgin Islands, where she was ordered to continue immediately to France, where she reached Le Havre on 27 March. She left Le Havre on 24 April, and reached New York on 7 May.

In New York Zuiderdijk loaded cargo, and on 17 June she left port for her final US Navy voyage. She discharged her cargo in London in the first fortnight of July. On 17 July she reached Rotterdam. Four days later she was decommissioned, stricken from the Navy list, and returned to her owners.

== Misty Law ==
In 1923 Thomas Law & Co bought Zuiderdijk, renamed her Misty Law, and registered her in Glasgow. Her UK official number was 128934 and her code letters were KNJQ. By 1930 her wireless telegraph was call sign was GJRL.

== Edera ==
In 1931 Achille Lauro bought Misty Law, renamed her Edera, and registered her in Naples. Her code letters were NLFP, and by 1934 her call sign was ICPS.

After Italy entered the Second World War in June 1940, Lauro laid up Edera in the Port of A Coruña. Italy signed the Armistice of Cassibile in September 1943, and that December the Italian government requisitioned Edera for Allied service.

In 1949 Francesco Pittaluga fu Giacomo acquired Edera and registered her in Genoa.

== Frin and Mahfuz ==
In 1956 the Compañía Maritima Caribe SA acquired Edera, renamed her Frin, registered her in Puerto Limón, Costa Rica, and appointed Constantinos A Petroutsis of Piraeus, Greece to manage her. Later that year her ownership and management passed to the Linea Adriatico Golfo Persa Limitada, who renamed her Mahfuz. On 20 November 1957 Mahfuz arrived in Trieste to be scrapped.

== Bibliography ==
- Lloyd's Register of Shipping. Vol. II.–Steamers. London: Lloyd's Register of Shipping. 1917 – via Internet Archive.
- Lloyd's Register of Shipping (PDF). Vol. II.–Steamers and Motorships of 300 Tons Gross and Over. London: Lloyd's Register of Shipping. 1932 – via Southampton City Council.
- Lloyd's Register of Shipping (PDF). Vol. II.–Steamers and Motorships of 300 Tons Gross and Over. London: Lloyd's Register of Shipping. 1934 – via Southampton City Council.
- Mercantile Navy List. London. 1930 – via Crew List Index Project.
- Register Book. Vol. I. A–L. London: Lloyd's Register of Shipping. 1949 – via Internet Archive.
