= Khorramabad, Mazandaran =

City in Mazandaran province, Iran

Khorramabad Gilaki: خؤرم ‌آباد
- City
- Location within Iran
- Coordinates: 36°46′56″N 50°52′17″E
- Country: Iran
- Province: Mazandaran
- County: Tonekabon
- District: Khorramabad

Population (2016)
  - Total: 11,542
- Time zone: UTC+3:30 (IRST)

Khorramabad (Persian: خرم آباد) (Note: Also romanized as Khorramābād; also known as Khurramābād) is a city in, and the capital of, Khorramabad District in Tonekabon County, Mazandaran province, Iran.

== Demographics ==
=== Population ===
At the time of the 2006 National Census, the city's population was 9,936 in 2,784 households. The following census in 2011 counted 9,114 people in 2,819 households. The 2016 census measured the population of the city as 11,542 people in 3,902 households.
