= Mazi Bon =

Mazi Bon مازي بن
- Village
- Location within Iran
- Coordinates: 36°54′10″N 50°11′41″E
- Country: Iran
- Province: Gilan
- County: Rudsar
- Bakhsh: Rahimabad
- Rural District: Eshkevar-e Sofla

Population (2006)
  - Total: 94
- Time zone: UTC+3:30 (IRST)
  - Summer (DST): UTC+4:30 (IRDT)

Mazi Bon (Persian: مازي بن, also Romanized as Māẕī Bon; also known as Māzūbon) is a village in Eshkevar-e Sofla Rural District, Rahimabad District, Rudsar County, Gilan Province, Iran. At the 2006 census, its population was 94, in 24 families.
