= Miankuh Rural District =

Miankuh Rural District (Persian: دهستان ميانكوه) may refer to various places in Iran:

- Miankuh Rural District (Ardal County), Chaharmahal and Bakhtiari province
- Miankuh Rural District (Dargaz County), Razavi Khorasan province
- Miankuh Rural District (Mehriz County), Yazd province
- Miyankuh-e Gharbi Rural District, Lorestan province
- Miyankuh-e Sharqi Rural District, Lorestan province

== See also ==
- Miankuh-e Moguyi Rural District, Chaharmahal and Bakhtiari province
