= Harat Bar, Rahimabad =

Harat Bar هراتبر
- Village
- Location within Iran
- Coordinates: 37°00′02″N 50°17′55″E
- Country: Iran
- Province: Gilan
- County: Rudsar
- Bakhsh: Rahimabad
- Rural District: Rahimabad

Population (2006)
  - Total: 205
- Time zone: UTC+3:30 (IRST)
  - Summer (DST): UTC+4:30 (IRDT)

Harat Bar (Persian: هراتبر, also Romanized as Harāt Bār and Harāt Bar) is a village in Rahimabad Rural District, Rahimabad District, Rudsar County, Gilan Province, Iran. At the 2006 census, its population was 205, in 54 families.
