= Baladeh-ye Sharqi Rural District =

Rural district in Mazandaran province, Iran

Baladeh-ye Sharqi Rural District Persian: دهستان بلده شرقی
- Rural District
- Location within Iran
- Coordinates: 36°46′N 50°54′E
- Country: Iran
- Province: Mazandaran
- County: Tonekabon
- District: Khorramabad
- Established: 2020
- Capital: Nematabad
- Time zone: UTC+3:30 (IRST)

Baladeh-ye Sharqi Rural District (Persian: دهستان بلده شرقی) is in Khorramabad District of Tonekabon County, Mazandaran province, Iran. Its capital is the village of Nematabad, whose population at the time of the 2016 National Census was 2,597 in 895 households.

== History ==
Baladeh-ye Sharqi Rural District was created in Khorramabad District in 2020.

== Other villages in the rural district ==
- Ab Kuleh Sar-e Bozorg
- Akbarabad
- Amirabad
- Azizabad
- Barsibur
- Behkaleh
- Gil Mahalleh
- Hameshbur
- Karaf
- Karat-e Kalleh
- Kenarvar
- Lashgarak
- Mansurabad
- Mazubon-e Sofla
- Miankuh Mahalleh
- Palham Dasht
- Pas Kalayeh-ye Bozorg
- Shaneh Tarash Mahalleh
- Shiraj Kheyl
- Shiraj Mahalleh-ye Bozorg
- Tazehabad
