= Mian Kuh, South Khorasan =

Mian Kuh ميان كوه
- Village
- Location within Iran
- Coordinates: 32°39′20″N 59°20′36″E
- Country: Iran
- Province: South Khorasan
- County: Sarbisheh
- Bakhsh: Mud
- Rural District: Mud

Population (2006)
  - Total: 37
- Time zone: UTC+3:30 (IRST)
  - Summer (DST): UTC+4:30 (IRDT)

Mian Kuh (Persian: ميان كوه, also Romanized as Mīān Kūh and Miyān Kūh) is a village in Mud Rural District, Mud District, Sarbisheh County, South Khorasan Province, Iran. At the 2006 census, its population was 37, in 13 families.
