= Shahrestan, Fasa =

Shahrestan شهرستان
- Village
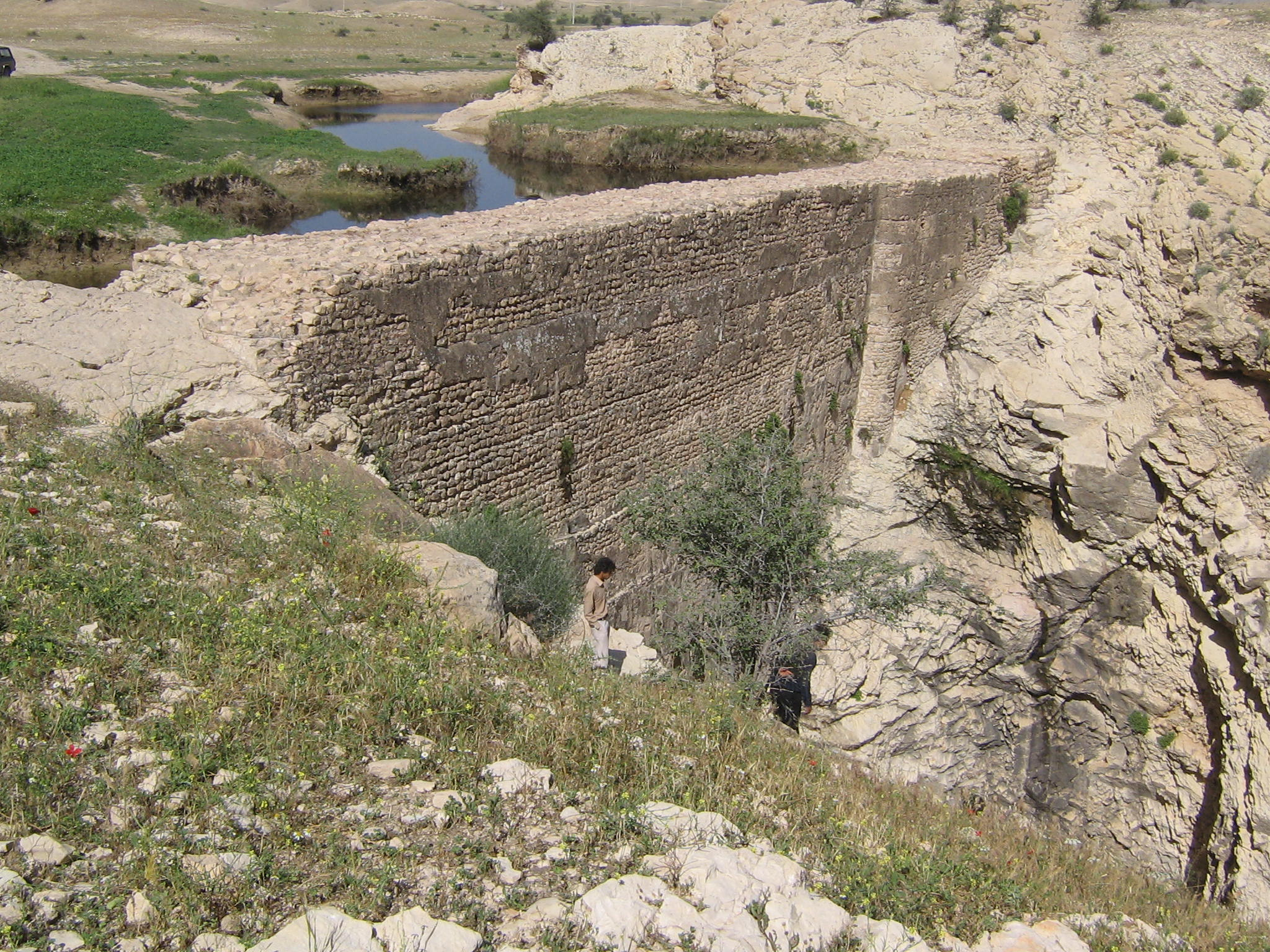

- Location within Iran
- Coordinates: 29°06′00″N 53°37′52″E
- Country: Iran
- Province: Fars
- County: Fasa
- Bakhsh: Central
- Rural District: Kushk-e Qazi

Population (2006)
  - Total: 539
- Time zone: UTC+3:30 (IRST)
  - Summer (DST): UTC+4:30 (IRDT)

Shahrestan (Persian: شهرستان, also Romanized as Shahrestān; also known as Shahristān and Sharestān) is a village in Kushk-e Qazi Rural District, in the Central District of Fasa County, Fars province, Iran. At the 2006 census, its population was 539, in 125 families.
