= Harat Bar, Chaboksar =

Harat Bar هرات بر
- Village
- Location within Iran
- Coordinates: 36°59′28″N 50°31′02″E
- Country: Iran
- Province: Gilan
- County: Rudsar
- Bakhsh: Chaboksar
- Rural District: Owshiyan

Population (2006)
  - Total: 207
- Time zone: UTC+3:30 (IRST)
  - Summer (DST): UTC+4:30 (IRDT)
- Website: http://www.oshiyan.ir

Harat Bar (Persian: هرات بر, also Romanized as Harāt Bar) is a village in Owshiyan Rural District, Chaboksar District, Rudsar County, Gilan Province, Iran. It is located south to Caspian sea and north to Alborz mountain. Distance between sea and mountain in this area is 1300 meters. At the 2006 census, its population was 207, in 63 families.
