= Qaleh Gardan, Gilan =

Qaleh Gardan قلعه گردن
- Village
- Location within Iran
- Coordinates: 36°59′45″N 50°16′30″E
- Country: Iran
- Province: Gilan
- County: Rudsar
- Bakhsh: Rahimabad
- Rural District: Rahimabad

Population (2016)
  - Total: 203
- Time zone: UTC+3:30 (IRST)

Qaleh Gardan (Persian: قلعه گردن, also Romanized as Qal‘eh Gardan) is a village in Rahimabad Rural District, Rahimabad District, Rudsar County, Gilan Province, Iran. At the 2006 census, its population was 203, in 68 families. Up from 197 in 2006.
