= Do Hezar Rural District =

Rural district in Mazandaran province, Iran

Do Hezar Rural District Persian: دهستان دوهزار
- Rural District
- Location within Iran
- Coordinates: 36°36′N 50°43′E
- Country: Iran
- Province: Mazandaran
- County: Tonekabon
- District: Kuhestan
- Established: 1993
- Capital: Emamzadeh Qasem

Population (2016)
  - Total: 2,326
- Time zone: UTC+3:30 (IRST)

Do Hezar Rural District (Persian: دهستان دوهزار) is in Kuhestan District of Tonekabon County, Mazandaran province, Iran. Its capital is the village of Emamzadeh Qasem.

== Demographics ==
=== Population ===
At the time of the 2006 National Census, the rural district's population (as a part of Khorramabad District) was 1,494 in 475 households. There were 2,789 inhabitants in 1,027 households at the following census of 2011. The 2016 census measured the population of the rural district as 2,326 in 883 households. The most populous of its 45 villages was Barseh, with 454 people.

In 2020, the rural district was separated from the district in the formation of Kuhestan District.

=== Other villages in the rural district ===
- Bala Eshtuj
- Balas
- Esel Mahalleh
- Golestan Mahalleh
- Halu Kaleh
- Mian Kuh
- Miankuh Sadat
- Naras
- Pain Eshtuj
