= Seh Hezar Rural District =

Rural district in Mazandaran province, Iran

Seh Hezar Rural District Persian: دهستان سه هزار
- Rural District
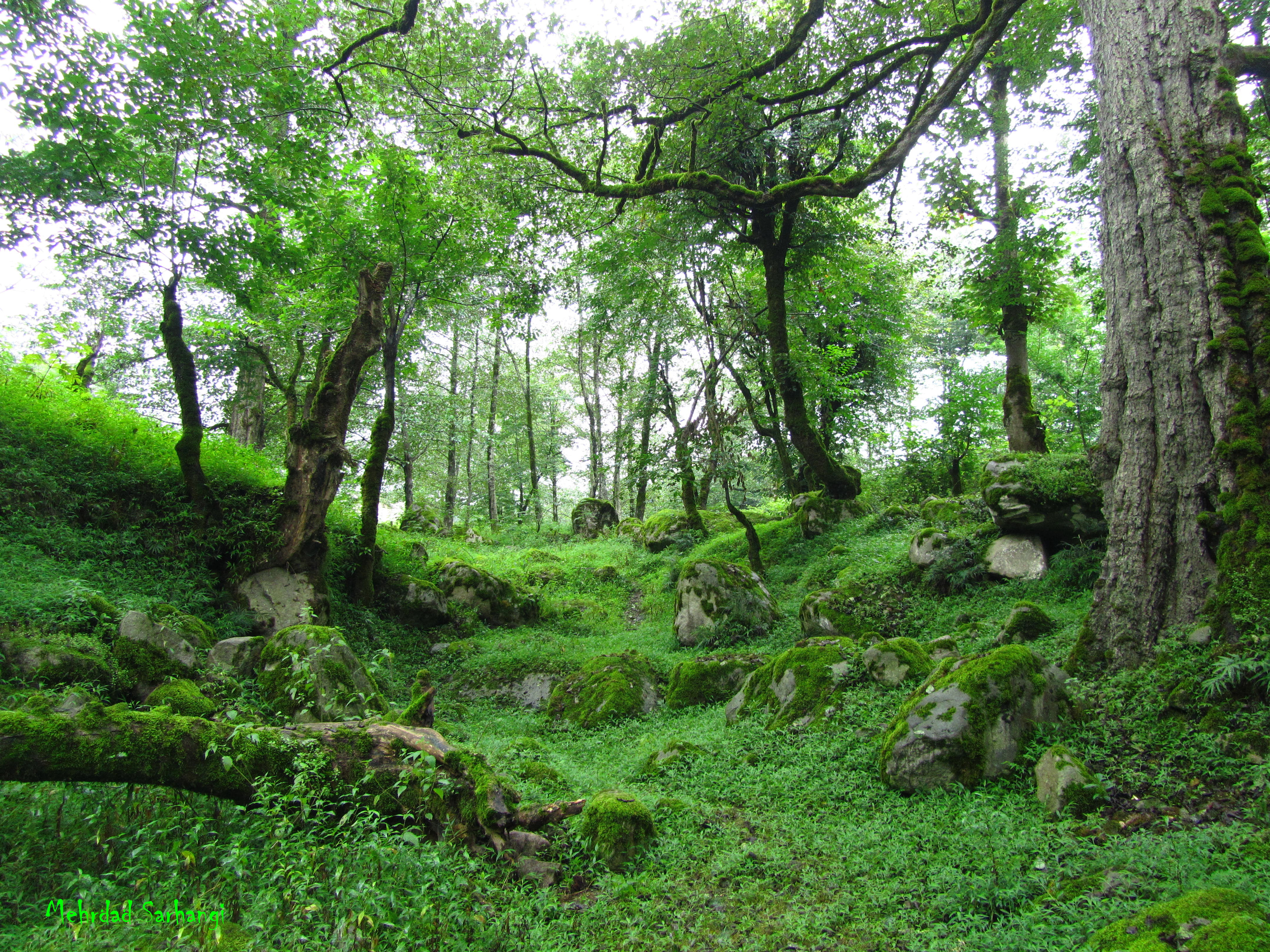
- Seh Hezar jungle

- Location within Iran
- Coordinates: 36°29′N 50°48′E
- Country: Iran
- Province: Mazandaran
- County: Tonekabon
- District: Kuhestan
- Established: 1993
- Capital: Yuj

Population (2016)
  - Total: 1,308
- Time zone: UTC+3:30 (IRST)

Seh Hezar Rural District (Persian: دهستان سه هزار) is in Kuhestan District of Tonekabon County, Mazandaran province, Iran. Its capital is the village of Yuj.

== Demographics ==
=== Population ===
At the time of the 2006 National Census, the rural district's population (as a part of Khorramabad District) was 988 in 287 households. There were 2,030 inhabitants in 681 households at the following census of 2011. The 2016 census measured the population of the rural district as 1,308 in 488 households. The most populous of its 45 villages was Darjan, with 159 people.

In 2020, the rural district was separated from the district in the formation of Kuhestan District.

=== Other villages in the rural district ===
- Ash Mahalleh
- Khanian
- Maran
- Saran
- Sarvash Poshteh
- Shahrestanak
- Yan Dasht-e Bala
