= Baladeh Rural District (Tonekabon County) =

Rural district in Mazandaran province, Iran

Baladeh Rural District Persian: دهستان بلده
- Rural District
- Location within Iran
- Coordinates: 36°45′N 50°53′E
- Country: Iran
- Province: Mazandaran
- County: Tonekabon
- District: Khorramabad
- Established: 1987
- Capital: Qaleh Gardan

Population (2016)
  - Total: 25,830
- Time zone: UTC+3:30 (IRST)

Baladeh Rural District (Persian: دهستان بلده) is in Khorramabad District of Tonekabon County, Mazandaran province, Iran. Its capital is the village of Qaleh Gardan. The previous capital of the rural district was the village of Baladeh.

== Demographics ==
=== Population ===
At the time of the 2006 National Census, the rural district's population was 25,099 in 6,907 households. There were 26,330 inhabitants in 8,277 households at the following census of 2011. The 2016 census measured the population of the rural district as 25,830 in 8,838 households. The most populous of its 83 villages was Nematabad, now in Baladeh-ye Sharqi Rural District, with 2,597 people.

=== Other villages in the rural district ===
- Aghuz Kaleh
- Estakhr Sar
- Kal-e Lat
- Karajub Konar
- Kardegar Mahalleh
- Marzak
- Mian Sara
- Sangar Deh
- Shirvan Mahalleh
- Siavarz
- Talu Sarak
- Toshkun
- Tusa Kalleh
- Zamin Bon
