= Kuhestan District =

District in Mazandaran province, Iran

Kuhestan District Persian: بخش کوهستان
- District
- Location within Iran
- Coordinates: 36°31′N 50°47′E
- Country: Iran
- Province: Mazandaran
- County: Tonekabon
- Established: 2020
- Capital: Gol-e Aliabad
- Time zone: UTC+3:30 (IRST)

Kuhestan District (Persian: بخش کوهستان) is in Tonekabon County, Mazandaran province, Iran. Its capital is the village of Gol-e Aliabad, whose population at the time of the 2016 National Census was 598 in 230 households.

== History ==
In 2020, Do Hezar and Seh Hezar Rural Districts were separated from Khorramabad District in the formation of Kuhestan District.

== Demographics ==
=== Administrative divisions ===
Kuhestan District
Administrative Divisions
Do Hezar RD
Miyandaman RD
Seh Hezar RD
RD = Rural District
