= Khorramabad District =

District in Mazandaran province, Iran

Khorramabad District Persian: بخش خرم‌آباد
- District
- Location within Iran
- Coordinates: 36°45′N 50°53′E
- Country: Iran
- Province: Mazandaran
- County: Tonekabon
- Established: 2003
- Capital: Khorramabad

Population (2016)
  - Total: 41,006
- Time zone: UTC+3:30 (IRST)

Khorramabad District (Persian: بخش خرم‌آباد) is in Tonekabon County, Mazandaran province, Iran. Its capital is the city of Khorramabad.

== History ==
In 2020, Baladeh-ye Sharqi Rural District was established in the district, and Do Hezar and Seh Hezar Rural Districts were separated from it in the formation of Kuhestan District

== Demographics ==
=== Population ===
At the time of the 2006 National Census, the district's population was 37,517 in 10,453 households. The following census in 2011 counted 40,263 people in 12,804 households. The 2016 census measured the population of the district as 41,006 inhabitants in 14,111 households.

=== Administrative divisions ===
Khorramabad District Population
Administrative Divisions	2006	2011	2016
Baladeh RD	25,099	26,330	25,830
Baladeh-ye Sharqi RD (Note: Established after the 2016 census)			
Do Hezar RD (Note: Transferred to Kuhestan District after the 2016 census)	1,494	2,789	2,326
Seh Hezar RD	988	2,030	1,308
Khorramabad (city)	9,936	9,114	11,542
Total	37,517	40,263	41,006
RD = Rural District
