= Tilursar-e Sharqi =

Village in Mazandaran province, Iran

Tilursar-e Sharqi Persian: تيلورسرشرقي
- Village
- Location within Iran
- Coordinates: 36°41′52″N 51°13′16″E
- Country: Iran
- Province: Mazandaran
- County: Abbasabad
- District: Kelar
- Rural District: Kelar-e Gharbi

Population (2016)
  - Total: 259
- Time zone: UTC+3:30 (IRST)

Tilursar-e Sharqi (Persian: تیلورسر شرقی) (Note: Also romanized as Tīlūrsar-e Sharqī; also known as Tīlūr) is a village in Kelar-e Gharbi Rural District of Kelar District in Abbasabad County, Mazandaran province, Iran. It is an eastern suburb of the city of Salman Shahr, bordering the village of Sisara to its north and east.

== Demographics ==
=== Population ===
At the time of the 2006 National Census, the village's population was 512 in 156 households, when it was in Kelarabad Rural District (Note: Renamed Kelarabad-e Gharbi Rural District) of the former Abbasabad District in Tonekabon County. The following census in 2011 counted 281 people in 81 households, by which time the district had been separated from the county in the establishment of Abbasabad County. The rural district was transferred to the new Kelarabad District (Note: Renamed Salmanshahr District) and renamed Kelarabad-e Gharbi Rural District. The village was transferred to Kelarabad-e Sharqi Rural District (Note: Renamed Kelar-e Sharqi Rural District) created in the same district. The 2016 census measured the population of the village as 259 people in 80 households, when the rural district had been separated from the district in the formation of Kelar District. Tilursar-e Sharqi was transferred to Kelar-e Gharbi Rural District created in the same district.
