= Charez =

Village in Mazandaran province, Iran

Charez Persian: چارز
- Village
- Location within Iran
- Coordinates: 36°40′05″N 51°14′14″E
- Country: Iran
- Province: Mazandaran
- County: Abbasabad
- District: Kelar
- Rural District: Kelar-e Sharqi

Population (2016)
  - Total: 978
- Time zone: UTC+3:30 (IRST)

Charez (Persian: چارز) (Note: Also romanized as Chāraz and Chārez) is a village in, and the capital of, Kelar-e Sharqi Rural District (Note: Formerly Kelarabad-e Sharqi Rural District) in Kelar District of Abbasabad County, Mazandaran province, Iran. It is a southern suburb of the city of Kelarabad, bordering the village of Jisa-ye Kelarabad to its east and Espi Rud to its west.

== Demographics ==
=== Population ===
At the time of the 2006 National Census, the village's population was 804 in 227 households, when it was in Kelarabad Rural District (Note: Renamed Kelarabad-e Gharbi Rural District) of the former Abbasabad District in Tonekabon County. The following census in 2011 counted 869 people in 285 households, by which time the district had been separated from the county in the establishment of Abbasabad County. The rural district was transferred to the new Kelarabad District (Note: Renamed Salmanshahr District) and renamed Kelarabad-e Gharbi Rural District. The village was transferred to Kelarabad-e Sharqi Rural District (Note: Renamed Kelar-e Sharqi Rural District) created in the same district. The 2016 census measured the population of the village as 978 people in 328 households, when the rural district had been separated from the district in the formation of Kelar District. The rural district was renamed Kelar-e Sharqi Rural District, and Charez was its most populous village.
