= Sisara, Mazandaran =

Village in Mazandaran province, Iran

Sisara Persian: سي سرا
- Village
- Location within Iran
- Coordinates: 36°42′12″N 51°13′27″E
- Country: Iran
- Province: Mazandaran
- County: Abbasabad
- District: Kelar
- Rural District: Kelar-e Gharbi

Population (2016)
  - Total: 1,272
- Time zone: UTC+3:30 (IRST)

Sisara (Persian: سي سرا) (Note: Also romanized as Sīsarā) is a village in, and the capital of, Kelar-e Gharbi Rural District in Kelar District of Abbasabad County, Mazandaran province, Iran. It is an eastern suburb of the city of Salman Shahr, west of the city of Kelarabad.

== Demographics ==
=== Population ===
At the time of the 2006 National Census, the village's population was 778 in 222 households, when it was in Kelarabad Rural District (Note: Renamed Kelarabad-e Gharbi Rural District) of the former Abbasabad District in Tonekabon County. The following census in 2011 counted 891 people in 287 households, by which time the district had been separated from the county in the establishment of Abbasabad County. The rural district was transferred to the new Kelarabad District (Note: Renamed Salmanshahr District) and renamed Kelarabad-e Gharbi Rural District. The village was transferred to Kelarabad-e Sharqi Rural District (Note: Renamed Kelar-e Sharqi Rural District) created in the same district. The 2016 census measured the population of the village as 1,272 people in 426 households, when the rural district had been separated from the district in the formation of Kelar District. Sisara was transferred to Kelar-e Gharbi Rural District created in the same district. It was the most populous village in its rural district.
