= Kelar-e Gharbi Rural District =

Rural district in Mazandaran province, Iran

Kelar-e Gharbi Rural District Persian: دهستان کلار غربی
- Rural District
- Location within Iran
- Coordinates: 36°39′N 51°13′E
- Country: Iran
- Province: Mazandaran
- County: Abbasabad
- District: Kelar
- Established: 2012
- Capital: Sisara

Population (2016)
  - Total: 2,293
- Time zone: UTC+3:30 (IRST)

Kelar-e Gharbi Rural District (Persian: دهستان کلار غربی) is in Kelar District of Abbasabad County, Mazandaran province, Iran. Its capital is the village of Sisara.

== History ==
In 2009, Abbasabad District was separated from Tonekabon County in the establishment of Abbasabad County, which was divided into two districts of two rural districts each, with the city of Abbasabad as its capital.

In 2012, Kelarabad-e Sharqi Rural District (Note: Renamed Kelar-e Sharqi Rural District) and the city of Kelarabad were separated from Kelarabad District (Note: Renamed Salmanshahr District) in the formation of Kelar District. Kelar-e Gharbi Rural District was created in the new district.

== Demographics ==
=== Population ===
At the time of the 2016 National Census, the rural district's population was 2,293 in 751 households. The most populous of its six villages was Sisara, with 1,272 people.

=== Other villages in the rural district ===
- Golur-e Bala
- Narenj Bandben
- Tilursar-e Sharqi
