= Yalbandan =

Village in Mazandaran province, Iran

Yalbandan Persian: يالبندان
- Village
- Location within Iran
- Coordinates: 36°40′16″N 51°16′38″E
- Country: Iran
- Province: Mazandaran
- County: Abbasabad
- District: Kelar
- Rural District: Kelar-e Sharqi

Population (2016)
  - Total: 873
- Time zone: UTC+3:30 (IRST)

Yalbandan (Persian: يالبندان) (Note: Also romanized as Yālbandān) is a village in Kelar-e Sharqi Rural District (Note: Formerly Kelarabad-e Sharqi Rural District) of Kelar District in Abbasabad County, Mazandaran province, Iran. It is a southern suburb of the city of Kelarabad, bordering Yalbandan-e Sara to its west, Mianki to its east, and Ahangar Kola to its northeast.

== Demographics ==
=== Population ===
At the time of the 2006 National Census, the village's population was 611 in 170 households, when it was in Kelarabad Rural District (Note: Renamed Kelarabad-e Gharbi Rural District) of the former Abbasabad District in Tonekabon County. The following census in 2011 counted 832 people in 263 households, by which time the district had been separated from the county in the establishment of Abbasabad County. The rural district was transferred to the new Kelarabad District (Note: Renamed Salmanshahr District) and renamed Kelarabad-e Gharbi Rural District. The village was transferred to Kelarabad-e Sharqi Rural District (Note: Renamed Kelar-e Sharqi Rural District) created in the same district. The 2016 census measured the population of the village as 873 people in 280 households, when the rural district had been separated from the district in the formation of Kelar District and renamed Kelar-e Sharqi Rural District.
