= Golur-e Bala =

Village in Mazandaran province, Iran

Golur-e Bala Persian: گلوربالا
- Village
- Location within Iran
- Coordinates: 36°41′21″N 51°13′53″E
- Country: Iran
- Province: Mazandaran
- County: Abbasabad
- District: Kelar
- Rural District: Kelar-e Gharbi

Population (2016)
  - Total: 570
- Time zone: UTC+3:30 (IRST)

Golur-e Bala (Persian: گلوربالا) (Note: Also romanized as Golūr-e Bālā; also known as Golūr) is a village in Kelar-e Gharbi Rural District of Kelar District in Abbasabad County, Mazandaran province, Iran.

== Demographics ==
=== Population ===
At the time of the 2006 National Census, the village's population was 462 in 131 households, when it was in Kelarabad Rural District (Note: Renamed Kelarabad-e Gharbi Rural District) of the former Abbasabad District in Tonekabon County. The following census in 2011 counted 654 people in 193 households, by which time the district had been separated from the county in the establishment of Abbasabad County. The rural district was transferred to the new Kelarabad District (Note: Renamed Salmanshahr District) and renamed Kelarabad-e Gharbi Rural District. The village was transferred to Kelarabad-e Sharqi Rural District (Note: Renamed Kelar-e Sharqi Rural District) created in the same district. The 2016 census measured the population of the village as 570 people in 179 households, when the rural district had been separated from the district in the formation of Kelar District. Golur-e Bala was transferred to Kelar-e Gharbi Rural District created in the same district.
