= Jisa-ye Kelarabad =

Village in Mazandaran province, Iran

Jisa-ye Kelarabad Persian: جيساكلاراباد
- Village
- Location within Iran
- Coordinates: 36°39′57″N 51°14′41″E
- Country: Iran
- Province: Mazandaran
- County: Abbasabad
- District: Kelar
- Rural District: Kelar-e Sharqi

Population (2016)
  - Total: 193
- Time zone: UTC+3:30 (IRST)

Jisa-ye Kelarabad (Persian: جيساكلاراباد) (Note: Also romanized as Jīsā-ye Kelārābād; also known as Jīsā-ye Pā’īn and Jīsā-ye Soflá) is a village in Kelar-e Sharqi Rural District (Note: Formerly Kelarabad-e Sharqi Rural District) of Kelar District in Abbasabad County, Mazandaran province, Iran. It is a southern suburb of the city of Kelarabad, bordering Charaz village to its west and Yalbandan-e Sara to its east.

== Demographics ==
=== Population ===
At the time of the 2006 National Census, the village's population was 204 in 59 households, when it was in Kelarabad Rural District (Note: Renamed Kelarabad-e Gharbi Rural District) of the former Abbasabad District in Tonekabon County. The following census in 2011 counted 205 people in 62 households, by which time the district had been separated from the county in the establishment of Abbasabad County. The rural district was transferred to the new Kelarabad District (Note: Renamed Salmanshahr District) and renamed Kelarabad-e Gharbi Rural District. The village was transferred to Kelarabad-e Sharqi Rural District (Note: Renamed Kelar-e Sharqi Rural District) created in the same district. The 2016 census measured the population of the village as 193 people in 63 households, when the rural district had been separated from the district in the formation of Kelar District and renamed Kelar-e Sharqi Rural District.
