= Valikestan =

Village in Mazandaran province, Iran

Valikestan Persian: وليكستان
- Village
- Location within Iran
- Coordinates: 36°41′30″N 51°03′38″E
- Country: Iran
- Province: Mazandaran
- County: Abbasabad
- District: Central
- Rural District: Langarud-e Gharbi

Population (2016)
  - Total: 567
- Time zone: UTC+3:30 (IRST)

Valikestan (Persian: وليكستان) (Note: Also romanized as Valīkestān) is a village in, and the capital of, Langarud-e Gharbi Rural District in the Central District of Abbasabad County, Mazandaran province, Iran.

== Demographics ==
=== Population ===
At the time of the 2006 National Census, the village's population was 519 in 128 households, when it was in Langarud Rural District (Note: Renamed Langarud-e Sharqi Rural District) of the former Abbasabad District in Tonekabon County. The following census in 2011 counted 466 people in 129 households, by which time the district had been separated from the county in the establishment of Abbasabad County. The rural district was transferred to the new Central District and renamed Langarud-e Sharqi Rural District. Valikestan was transferred to Langarud-e Gharbi Rural District created in the same district. The 2016 census measured the population of the village as 567 people in 178 households.
