= Har Do Ab Rud =

Village in Mazandaran province, Iran

Har Do Ab Rud Persian: هردوابرود
- Village
- Location within Iran
- Coordinates: 36°40′31″N 51°05′50″E
- Country: Iran
- Province: Mazandaran
- County: Abbasabad
- District: Central
- Rural District: Langarud-e Gharbi

Population (2016)
  - Total: 303
- Time zone: UTC+3:30 (IRST)

Har Do Ab Rud (Persian: هردوابرود) (Note: Also romanized as Har Do Āb Rūd) is a village in Langarud-e Gharbi Rural District of the Central District in Abbasabad County, Mazandaran province, Iran.

== Demographics ==
=== Population ===
At the time of the 2006 National Census, the village's population was 285 in 86 households, when it was in Langarud Rural District (Note: Renmed Langarud-e Sharqi Rural District) of the former Abbasabad District in Tonekabon County. The following census in 2011 counted 346 people in 108 households, by which time the district had been separated from the county in the establishment of Abbasabad County. The rural district was transferred to the new Central District and renamed Langarud-e Sharqi Rural District. Har Do Ab Rud was transferred to Langarud-e Gharbi Rural District created in the same district. The 2016 census measured the population of the village as 303 people in 116 households.
