= Pasandeh-ye Olya =

Village in Mazandaran province, Iran

Pasandeh-ye Olya Persian: پسنده عليا
- Village
- Location within Iran
- Coordinates: 36°42′46″N 51°04′48″E
- Country: Iran
- Province: Mazandaran
- County: Abbasabad
- District: Central
- Rural District: Langarud-e Gharbi

Population (2016)
  - Total: 711
- Time zone: UTC+3:30 (IRST)

Pasandeh-ye Olya (Persian: پسنده عليا) (Note: Also romanized as Pasandeh-ye ‘Olyā; also known as Pasandeh-ye Bālā) is a village in Langarud-e Gharbi Rural District of the Central District in Abbasabad County, Mazandaran province, Iran.

== Demographics ==
=== Population ===
At the time of the 2006 National Census, the village's population was 622 in 175 households, when it was in Langarud Rural District (Note: Renmed Langarud-e Sharqi Rural District) of the former Abbasabad District in Tonekabon County. The following census in 2011 counted 638 people in 207 households, by which time the district had been separated from the county in the establishment of Abbasabad County. The rural district was transferred to the new Central District and renamed Langarud-e Sharqi Rural District. Pasandeh-ye Olya was transferred to Langarud-e Gharbi Rural District created in the same district. The 2016 census measured the population of the village as 711 people in 252 households. It was the most populous village in its rural district.
