= Parchur, Iran =

Village in Mazandaran province, Iran

Parchur Persian: پرچور
- Village
- Location within Iran
- Coordinates: 36°41′04″N 51°05′11″E
- Country: Iran
- Province: Mazandaran
- County: Abbasabad
- District: Central
- Rural District: Langarud-e Gharbi

Population (2016)
  - Total: 663
- Time zone: UTC+3:30 (IRST)

Parchur (Persian: پرچور) (Note: Also romanized as Parchūr; also known as Parchehvar) is a village in Langarud-e Gharbi Rural District of the Central District in Abbasabad County, Mazandaran province, Iran.

== Demographics ==
=== Population ===
At the time of the 2006 National Census, the village's population was 678 in 182 households, when it was in Langarud Rural District (Note: Renmed Langarud-e Sharqi Rural District) of the former Abbasabad District in Tonekabon County. The following census in 2011 counted 627 people in 184 households, by which time the district had been separated from the county in the establishment of Abbasabad County. The rural district was transferred to the new Central District and renamed Langarud-e Sharqi Rural District. Parchur was transferred to Langarud-e Gharbi Rural District created in the same district. The 2016 census measured the population of the village as 663 people in 218 households.
