= Jisa =

JISA is the Japan Information Industry Association.

Jisa (Persian: جيسا) may refer to:

- Jisa-ye Danial
- Jisa-ye Kelarabad
- Jisa-ye Khezrabad

Jișa may refer to:

- Jișa River, a river in Romania
