= Gorji Sara =

Village in Mazandaran province, Iran

Gorji Sara Persian: گرجي سرا
- Village
- Location within Iran
- Coordinates: 36°42′01″N 51°10′56″E
- Country: Iran
- Province: Mazandaran
- County: Abbasabad
- District: Salmanshahr
- Rural District: Kelarabad-e Gharbi

Population (2016)
  - Total: 603
- Time zone: UTC+3:30 (IRST)

Gorji Sara (Persian: گرجي سرا) (Note: Also romanized as Gorjī Sarā; also known as Gach Sarā) is a village in Kelarabad-e Gharbi Rural District (Note: Formerly Kelarabad Rural District) of Salmanshahr District (Note: Formerly Kelarabad District) in Abbasabad County, Mazandaran province, Iran.

== Demographics ==
=== Population ===
At the time of the 2006 National Census, the village's population was 251 in 75 households, when it was in Kelarabad Rural District (Note: Renamed Kelarabad-e Gharbi Rural District) of the former Abbasabad District in Tonekabon County. The following census in 2011 counted 368 people in 119 households, by which time the district had been separated from the county in the establishment of Abbasabad County. The rural district was transferred to the new Kelarabad District (Note: Renamed Salmanshahr District) and renamed Kelarabad-e Gharbi Rural District. The 2016 census measured the population of the village as 603 people in 191 households, when the district had been renamed Salmanshahr District.
