= Karatkuti =

Village in Mazandaran province, Iran

Karatkuti Persian: كراتكوتی
- Village
- Location within Iran
- Coordinates: 36°42′17″N 51°10′22″E
- Country: Iran
- Province: Mazandaran
- County: Abbasabad
- District: Salmanshahr
- Rural District: Kelarabad-e Gharbi

Population (2016)
  - Total: 1,805
- Time zone: UTC+3:30 (IRST)

Karatkuti (Persian: كراتكوتی) (Note: Also romanized as Karātkūtī) is a village in Kelarabad-e Gharbi Rural District (Note: Formerly Kelarabad Rural District) of Salmanshahr District (Note: Formerly Kelarabad District) in Abbasabad County, Mazandaran province, Iran.

== Demographics ==
=== Population ===
At the time of the 2006 National Census, the village's population was 596 in 158 households, when it was in Kelarabad Rural District (Note: Renamed Kelarabad-e Gharbi Rural District) of the former Abbasabad District in Tonekabon County. The following census in 2011 counted 1,411 people in 421 households, by which time the district had been separated from the county in the establishment of Abbasabad County. The rural district was transferred to the new Kelarabad District (Note: Renamed Salmanshahr District) and renamed Kelarabad-e Gharbi Rural District. The 2016 census measured the population of the village as 1,805 people in 553 households, when the district had been renamed Salmanshahr District. Karatkuti was the most populous village in its rural district.
