= Espi Rud =

Village in Mazandaran province, Iran

Espi Rud Persian: اسپي رود
- Village
- Location within Iran
- Coordinates: 36°40′03″N 51°13′14″E
- Country: Iran
- Province: Mazandaran
- County: Abbasabad
- District: Kelar
- Rural District: Kelar-e Sharqi

Population (2016)
  - Total: 99
- Time zone: UTC+3:30 (IRST)

Espi Rud (Persian: اسپي رود) (Note: Also romanized as Espī Rūd) is a village in Kelar-e Sharqi Rural District (Note: Formerly Kelarabad-e Sharqi Rural District) of Kelar District in Abbasabad County, Mazandaran province, Iran.

== Demographics ==
=== Population ===
At the time of the 2006 National Census, the village's population was 108 in 32 households, when it was in Kelarabad Rural District (Note: Renamed Kelarabad-e Gharbi Rural District) of the former Abbasabad District in Tonekabon County. The following census in 2011 counted 121 people in 52 households, by which time the district had been separated from the county in the establishment of Abbasabad County. The rural district was transferred to the new Kelarabad District (Note: Renamed Salmanshahr District) and renamed Kelarabad-e Gharbi Rural District. The village was transferred to Kelarabad-e Sharqi Rural District (Note: Renamed Kelar-e Sharqi Rural District) created in the same district. The 2016 census measured the population of the village as 99 people in 35 households, when the rural district had been separated from the district in the formation of Kelar District and renamed Kelar-e Sharqi Rural District.
