= Seyyed Mahalleh, Abbasabad =

Village in Mazandaran province, Iran

Seyyed Mahalleh Persian: سيدمحله
- Village
- Location within Iran
- Coordinates: 36°41′54″N 51°06′09″E
- Country: Iran
- Province: Mazandaran
- County: Abbasabad
- District: Central
- Rural District: Langarud-e Sharqi

Population (2016)
  - Total: 1,005
- Time zone: UTC+3:30 (IRST)

Seyyed Mahalleh (Persian: سيدمحله) (Note: Also romanized as Seyyed Maḩalleh) is a village in, and the capital of, Langarud-e Sharqi Rural District (Note: Formerly Langarud Rural District) in the Central District of Abbasabad County, Mazandaran province, Iran.

== Demographics ==
=== Population ===
At the time of the 2006 National Census, the village's population was 782 in 224 households, when it was in Langarud Rural District (Note: Renamed Langarud-e Sharqi Rural District) of the former Abbasabad District in Tonekabon County. The following census in 2011 counted 951 people in 298 households, by which time the district had been separated from the county in the establishment of Abbasabad County. The rural district was transferred to the new Central District and renamed Langarud-e Sharqi Rural District. The 2016 census measured the population of the village as 1,005 people in 330 households.
