= Kazem Kola =

Village in Mazandaran province, Iran

Kazem Kola Persian: كاظم كلا
- Village
- Location within Iran
- Coordinates: 36°41′36″N 51°06′05″E
- Country: Iran
- Province: Mazandaran
- County: Abbasabad
- District: Central
- Rural District: Langarud-e Sharqi

Population (2016)
  - Total: 619
- Time zone: UTC+3:30 (IRST)

Kazem Kola (Persian: كاظم كلا) (Note: Also romanized as Kāz̧em Kolā) is a village in Langarud-e Sharqi Rural District (Note: Formerly Langarud Rural District) of the Central District in Abbasabad County, Mazandaran province, Iran.

== Demographics ==
=== Population ===
At the time of the 2006 National Census, the village's population was 495 in 140 households, when it was in Langarud Rural District (Note: Renamed Langarud-e Sharqi Rural District) of the former Abbasabad District in Tonekabon County. The following census in 2011 counted 573 people in 176 households, by which time the district had been separated from the county in the establishment of Abbasabad County. The rural district was transferred to the new Central District and renamed Langarud-e Sharqi Rural District. The 2016 census measured the population of the village as 619 people in 206 households.
