= Heydarabad, Abbasabad =

Village in Mazandaran province, Iran

Heydarabad Persian: حيدراباد
- Village
- Location within Iran
- Coordinates: 36°42′27″N 51°07′32″E
- Country: Iran
- Province: Mazandaran
- County: Abbasabad
- District: Central
- Rural District: Langarud-e Sharqi

Population (2016)
  - Total: 267
- Time zone: UTC+3:30 (IRST)

Heydarabad (Persian: حيدراباد) (Note: Also romanized as Ḩeydarābād) is a village in Langarud-e Sharqi Rural District (Note: Formerly Langarud Rural District) of the Central District in Abbasabad County, Mazandaran province, Iran.

== Demographics ==
=== Population ===
At the time of the 2006 National Census, the village's population was 207 in 58 households, when it was in Langarud Rural District (Note: Renamed Langarud-e Sharqi Rural District) of the former Abbasabad District in Tonekabon County. The following census in 2011 counted 218 people in 68 households, by which time the district had been separated from the county in the establishment of Abbasabad County. The rural district was transferred to the new Central District and renamed Langarud-e Sharqi Rural District. The 2016 census measured the population of the village as 267 people in 89 households.
