= Hamzehabad, Mazandaran =

Village in Mazandaran province, Iran

Hamzehabad Persian: حمزه اباد
- Village
- Location within Iran
- Coordinates: 36°42′40″N 51°09′01″E
- Country: Iran
- Province: Mazandaran
- County: Abbasabad
- District: Central
- Rural District: Langarud-e Sharqi

Population (2016)
  - Total: 1,740
- Time zone: UTC+3:30 (IRST)

Hamzehabad (Persian: حمزه اباد) (Note: Also romanized as Hamzehābād) is a village in Langarud-e Sharqi Rural District (Note: Formerly Langarud Rural District) of the Central District in Abbasabad County, Mazandaran province, Iran.

== Demographics ==
=== Population ===
At the time of the 2006 National Census, the village's population was 1,707 in 491 households, when it was in Langarud Rural District (Note: Renamed Langarud-e Sharqi Rural District) of the former Abbasabad District in Tonekabon County. The following census in 2011 counted 1,675 people in 528 households, by which time the district had been separated from the county in the establishment of Abbasabad County. The rural district was transferred to the new Central District and renamed Langarud-e Sharqi Rural District. The 2016 census measured the population of the village as 1,740 people in 580 households. It was the most populous village in its rural district.
