= Masha Allahabad =

Village in Mazandaran province, Iran

Masha Allahabad Persian: ماشا الله اباد
- Village
- Location within Iran
- Coordinates: 36°40′22″N 51°06′11″E
- Country: Iran
- Province: Mazandaran
- County: Abbasabad
- District: Central
- Rural District: Langarud-e Sharqi

Population (2016)
  - Total: 539
- Time zone: UTC+3:30 (IRST)

Masha Allahabad (Persian: ماشا الله اباد) (Note: Also romanized as Mashā Allāhābād; also known as Mashaollahabad, also romanized as Mashāollāhābād, and Māshelābād) is a village in Langarud-e Sharqi Rural District (Note: Formerly Langarud Rural District) of the Central District in Abbasabad County, Mazandaran province, Iran.

== Demographics ==
=== Population ===
At the time of the 2006 National Census, the village's population was 600 in 154 households, when it was in Langarud Rural District (Note: Renamed Langarud-e Sharqi Rural District) of the former Abbasabad District in Tonekabon County. The following census in 2011 counted 614 people in 183 households, by which time the district had been separated from the county in the establishment of Abbasabad County. The rural district was transferred to the new Central District and renamed Langarud-e Sharqi Rural District. The 2016 census measured the population of the village as 539 people in 177 households.
