= Sarlanga =

Village in Mazandaran province, Iran

Sarlanga Persian: سرلنگا
- Village
- Location within Iran
- Coordinates: 36°40′46″N 51°06′14″E
- Country: Iran
- Province: Mazandaran
- County: Abbasabad
- District: Central
- Rural District: Langarud-e Sharqi

Population (2016)
  - Total: 596
- Time zone: UTC+3:30 (IRST)

Sarlanga (Persian: سرلنگا) (Note: Also romanized as Sarlangā; also known as Sarlangāh) is a village in Langarud-e Sharqi Rural District (Note: Formerly Langarud Rural District) of the Central District in Abbasabad County, Mazandaran province, Iran.

== Demographics ==
=== Population ===
At the time of the 2006 National Census, the village's population was 583 in 162 households, when it was in Langarud Rural District (Note: Renamed Langarud-e Sharqi Rural District) of the former Abbasabad District in Tonekabon County. The following census in 2011 counted 586 people in 175 households, by which time the district had been separated from the county in the establishment of Abbasabad County. The rural district was transferred to the new Central District and renamed Langarud-e Sharqi Rural District. The 2016 census measured the population of the village as 596 people in 194 households.
