= Sajadiyeh =

Sajadiyeh or Sajjadiyeh (Persian: سجاديه) may refer to:

- Sajadiyeh, Bushehr
- Sajadiyeh, Kerman
- Sajjadiyeh, Khuzestan
- Sajadiyeh, Mazandaran
