= Tazehabad, Abbasabad =

Village in Mazandaran province, Iran

Tazehabad Persian: تازه اباد
- Village
- Location within Iran
- Coordinates: 36°42′35″N 51°10′16″E
- Country: Iran
- Province: Mazandaran
- County: Abbasabad
- District: Salmanshahr
- Rural District: Kelarabad-e Gharbi

Population (2016)
  - Total: 1,425
- Time zone: UTC+3:30 (IRST)

Tazehabad (Persian: تازه اباد) (Note: Also romanized as Tāzehābād) is a village in, and the capital of, Kelarabad-e Gharbi Rural District (Note: Formerly Kelarabad Rural District) in Salmanshahr District (Note: Formerly Kelarabad District) of Abbasabad County, Mazandaran province, Iran.

== Demographics ==
=== Population ===
At the time of the 2006 National Census, the village's population was 1,360 in 377 households, when it was in Kelarabad Rural District (Note: Renamed Kelarabad-e Gharbi Rural District) of the former Abbasabad District in Tonekabon County. The following census in 2011 counted 1,480 people in 455 households, by which time the district had been separated from the county in the establishment of Abbasabad County. The rural district was transferred to the new Kelarabad District (Note: Renamed Salmanshahr District) and renamed Kelarabad-e Gharbi Rural District. The 2016 census measured the population of the village as 1,425 people in 475 households, when the district had been renamed Salmanshahr District.
