= Ahangar Kola, Chalus =

Village in Mazandaran province, Iran

Ahangar Kola Persian: آهنگركلا
- Village
- Location within Iran
- Coordinates: 36°41′04″N 51°17′04″E
- Country: Iran
- Province: Mazandaran
- County: Chalus
- District: Central
- Rural District: Kelarestaq-e Gharbi

Population (2016)
  - Total: 640
- Time zone: UTC+3:30 (IRST)

Ahangar Kola (Persian: آهنگركلا) (Note: Also romanized as Āhangar Kalā and Āhangar Kolā) is a village in Kelarestaq-e Gharbi Rural District of the Central District in Chalus County, Mazandaran province, Iran.

== Demographics ==
=== Population ===
At the time of the 2006 National Census, the village's population was 638 in 176 households. The following census in 2011 counted 618 people in 194 households. The 2016 census measured the population of the village as 640 people in 220 households.

== Geography ==
Ahangar Kola is in a plain area between the northern slopes of the central Alborz mountains in the south and the Caspian Sea in the north. Namak Abrud forest park and Road 22 are located between the village and the Caspian Sea. Settlements near Ahangar Kola include Namakab Rud town and Daryanavardan township in the east, and Khushamian township of Abbasabad County in the west. Yalbandan village is to the southwest and Mianki village to the southeast.

== Overview ==
The people of Ahangar Kola speak the Chalusi dialect of Mazandarani and are employed in farming, gardening, tourism, and animal husbandry. Agricultural products include rice, kiwi fruit, citrus fruits, vegetable crops and animal products.
