= Mianki =

Village in Mazandaran province, Iran

Mianki Persian: میانکی
- Village
- Location within Iran
- Coordinates: 36°40′11″N 51°17′31″E
- Country: Iran
- Province: Mazandaran
- County: Chalus
- District: Central
- Rural District: Kelarestaq-e Gharbi

Population (2016)
  - Total: 331
- Time zone: UTC+3:30 (IRST)

Mianki (Persian: میانکی) (Note: Also romanized as Mīānkī) is a village in Kelarestaq-e Gharbi Rural District of the Central District in Chalus County, Mazandaran province, Iran.

== Demographics ==
=== Population ===
At the time of the 2006 National Census, the village's population was 303 in 79 households. The following census in 2011 counted 297 people in 91 households. The 2016 census measured the population of the village as 331 people in 109 households.

== Geography ==
Mianki is east of Namakab Rud town. Nearby villages are Ahangar Kola in the northwest, and Yalbandan village of Abbasabad County in the west.
