= Kola Kardeh =

Kola Kardeh (Persian: کلاکرده) may refer to:

- Kola Kardeh, Abbasabad
- Kola Kardeh, Sari
