= Langarud-e Gharbi Rural District =

Rural district in Mazandaran province, Iran

Langarud-e Gharbi Rural District Persian: دهستان لنگارود غربی
- Rural District
- Location within Iran
- Coordinates: 36°40′N 51°04′E
- Country: Iran
- Province: Mazandaran
- County: Abbasabad
- District: Central
- Established: 2009
- Capital: Valikestan

Population (2016)
  - Total: 3,011
- Time zone: UTC+3:30 (IRST)

Langarud-e Gharbi Rural District (Persian: دهستان لنگارود غربی) is in the Central District of Abbasabad County, Mazandaran province, Iran. Its capital is the village of Valikestan.

== History ==
In 2009, Abbasabad District was separated from Tonekabon County in the establishment of Abbasabad County, and Langarud-e Gharbi Rural District was created in the new Central District.

== Demographics ==
=== Population ===
At the time of the 2011 census, the rural district's population was 2,818 inhabitants in 831 households. The 2016 census measured the population of the rural district as 3,011 in 831 households. The most populous of its eight villages was Pasandeh-ye Olya, with 711 people.

=== Other villages in the rural district ===
- Emam Dasht
- Har Do Ab Rud
- Parchur
- Sartakarat
- Si Bon
