= Information Technology Professional Examination Council =

- Abbreviation: ITPEC
- Formation: November 15, 2005; 20 years ago
- Headquarters: Bunkyo-ku, Tokyo
- Location: Japan
- Region served: Southeast Asia and East Asia
- Website: itpec.org

The Information Technology Professional Examination Council (ITPEC), is an organization that conducts information technology examinations throughout Asian countries. It was formed to promote information exchange among examination bodies in Asia, and to facilitate such efforts as the development of common examination questions and the administration of the exam on the same date and time. It was established to support international strategies in the spheres of software development and information technology human resources.

It was established in November 2005 by representatives from the countries that have adopted JITEC-IPA's Examination Skill Standards to conduct the Common IP, FE and SW Examinations. These examinations are loosely based on the Japanese Information-Technology Engineers Examination.

The council's members currently include the Philippines, Thailand, Vietnam, Myanmar, Malaysia, Mongolia, Japan and Bangladesh. These countries agreed to conduct the examination on the same date and time with the same set of questions, so that the examination is consistent among all of the member countries. This consistency enables accurate measurement of the skills of the examinees, as the region shares one set of IT Skill Standards.

== ITPEC Members ==
- Information Technology Promotion Agency (IPA) - Japan
- Philippine National IT Standards Foundation (PhilNITS)
- Multimedia Technology Enhancement & Operations Sendirian Berhad (METEOR) - Malaysia
- Myanmar Computer Federation (MCF)
- National IT Park (NITP) - Mongolia
- NSTDA Academy - Thailand
- Hi-tech Incubation and Training Center (HITC) - Vietnam
- Bangladesh Computer Council (BCC) - Bangladesh

== Certifications ==
=== ITPEC IP Exam ===
The ITPEC Information Technology Passport Examination (ITPEC IP Exam) is loosely based on the Japan Information Technology Passport Examination translated in English, Thai, Vietnamese, and Mongol. The exam requires the person to have basic knowledge in IT that all business workers should commonly possess, perform and utilize IT related tasks in his/her charge.

==== Facts ====
- Exam Duration : 120 minutes
- Exam Type: Multiple Choice (One per four choices), 100 questions
  - Short Question type - one question per item, 88 questions
  - Medium Question type - four questions per item, 12 questions (3 items)
- Exam Sections :
  - Technology Field - 45%
  - Management Field - 20%
  - Strategy Field - 35%
- Point Allocation : 1000 points
- Grading Method : According to raw points, point weight are allocated for each question
- Passing criteria : A pass is granted when both conditions are satisfied:
1. Total points should be more than 60% or 600+ points
2. Points in each field: more than 30% of the maximum points in each of the three fields. (Strategy more than 110, Management more than 60, Technology more than 140)

==== Scope ====
- Computer systems and networks; office tools utilization.
  - Performance, characteristics and functions of information devices
  - OS settings and application software
  - Office tools utilization, other application software and groupware used in the workplace
- Corporate activity and related tasks, systematic thinking and logical thinking, problem analysis and problem solving methodologies.
  - Task work flows, issue identification
  - Simple analytical methods, IT and identity issues
  - Independent and consensus approach to solutions
- Relevant laws and regulations, various information security provisions.
  - Compliance to information technology and intellectual property laws and regulations
  - Internal compliance programs
  - Processes to prevent leakage, loss or damage of information
  - Internet usage
- Development and operations of information systems.
  - Investigation and organization of data
  - Systematization of tasks

=== ITPEC FE Exam ===
The ITPEC Fundamental Information Technology Engineer Examination (ITPEC FE Exam) is loosely based on the Japan Information Technology Fundamental IT Engineers Examination translated in English, Thai, Vietnamese, Mongol, and Burmese. The scope of the examination covers knowledge and skills required by individuals who have basic knowledge and skills related to general aspects of information technology, including those who compose program design sheets, construct programs, and conduct a series of operations to the extent of unit tests in information systems development projects.

The Information Technology Engineers Examination (ITEE) was first administered in Japan in 1969, and in 1970 it became a national examination under the former Ministry of International Trade and Industry (MITI, now Ministry of Economy, Trade and Industry [METI]). It has grown into one of the largest scale national examinations in Japan and has played an important role in the development of IT engineers.

In October 2000, the "Asian Common IT Skill Standards Initiative", proposed by Japan, was adopted at the ASEAN plus Japan, the People's Republic of China, and the Republic of Korea meeting. In accordance with this initiative, we are working toward the mutual recognition of skill standards for IT engineers in Asia. This collaboration is expected to help increase cross-border utilization of IT human resources and stimulate business alliances across the region. Since April 2006, the common FE examination has been conducted twice a year, in the first Sunday of April and third Sunday October at simultaneously starting 1000H Japanese Standard Time.

==== Test sections ====
The exam is administered for a total of five hours and broken into two parts:

- The AM Exam is a multiple-choice examination that runs 150 minutes. It is composed of 80 questions, all of which are compulsory and in multiple choice. It generally involves application of the fundamental IT concepts and terms, simple numerical calculations and logical analysis. Total score is 1000 and each question has its own weight depending on its difficulty. 600 points is the passing score.
- The PM Exam is a multiple-choice examination that runs 150 minutes. It covers knowledge and skills required by individuals who were able to implement pseudocodes and flowcharts. It will require skills in debugging and ability to trace the output of a structured program. Total score is 1000 and each question has its own weight depending on its difficulty. 600 points is the passing score.

Each question may have several sub-questions, each answered by multiple choice. The final portion is composed of two 4-question sets. The person must select only one question set depending on their choice of programming language to use (either C programming language or Java programming language).

==== Scope ====
- Computer Systems
  - Introduction
    - Basic Theories of Information
    - Hardware
    - Computer types
    - Basic Software
    - Multimedia System
    - System Configurations
  - Information Processing and Security
    - Accounting
    - Application Fields of Computer Systems
    - Security
    - Operations Research
- Systems Development and Operations
  - Systems Development
    - Development Methodologies
    - Requirement Analysis and Design Method
    - Programming Language
    - Programming Techniques
    - Test and Review Methods
    - Development Environments
    - Development Management
    - Software Packages
  - Systems Operations and Maintenance
    - Systems Operation
    - Systems Maintenance
- Internal Design and Programming
  - Data Structures
  - Algorithms
  - Internal Design
  - Program Design
  - Program Implementation
- Network and Database Technologies
  - Network Technology
    - Protocols and Transmission Control
    - Encoding and Transmission
    - LAN and WAN Networks
    - Communication Equipment and Network Software
  - Database Technology
    - Overview of Database
    - Database Language (SQL)
    - Database Management

=== ITPEC AP Exam ===
The ITPEC Applied Information Technology Examination, formerly known as Software Design and Development Engineer Examination, is also loosely based on its Japanese counterpart, the IPA SW Exam, require individuals who have at least two years work experience in software development and have the ability to compose internal design and program design sheets, construct effective programs for information systems development projects, and perform a series of processes ranging from unit tests to integrated tests. It is conducted once a year in the same venue of the FE Exams. The exam is administered for a total of five and a half hours and broken into two parts:

- AM Exam, a multiple-choice examination that lasts 150 minutes, and
- PM Written Exams: First sub-part runs for 120 minutes and the final sub-part runs for 60 minutes.
