= Kelarabad =

City in Mazandaran province, Iran

Kelarabad Persian: كلارآباد
- City
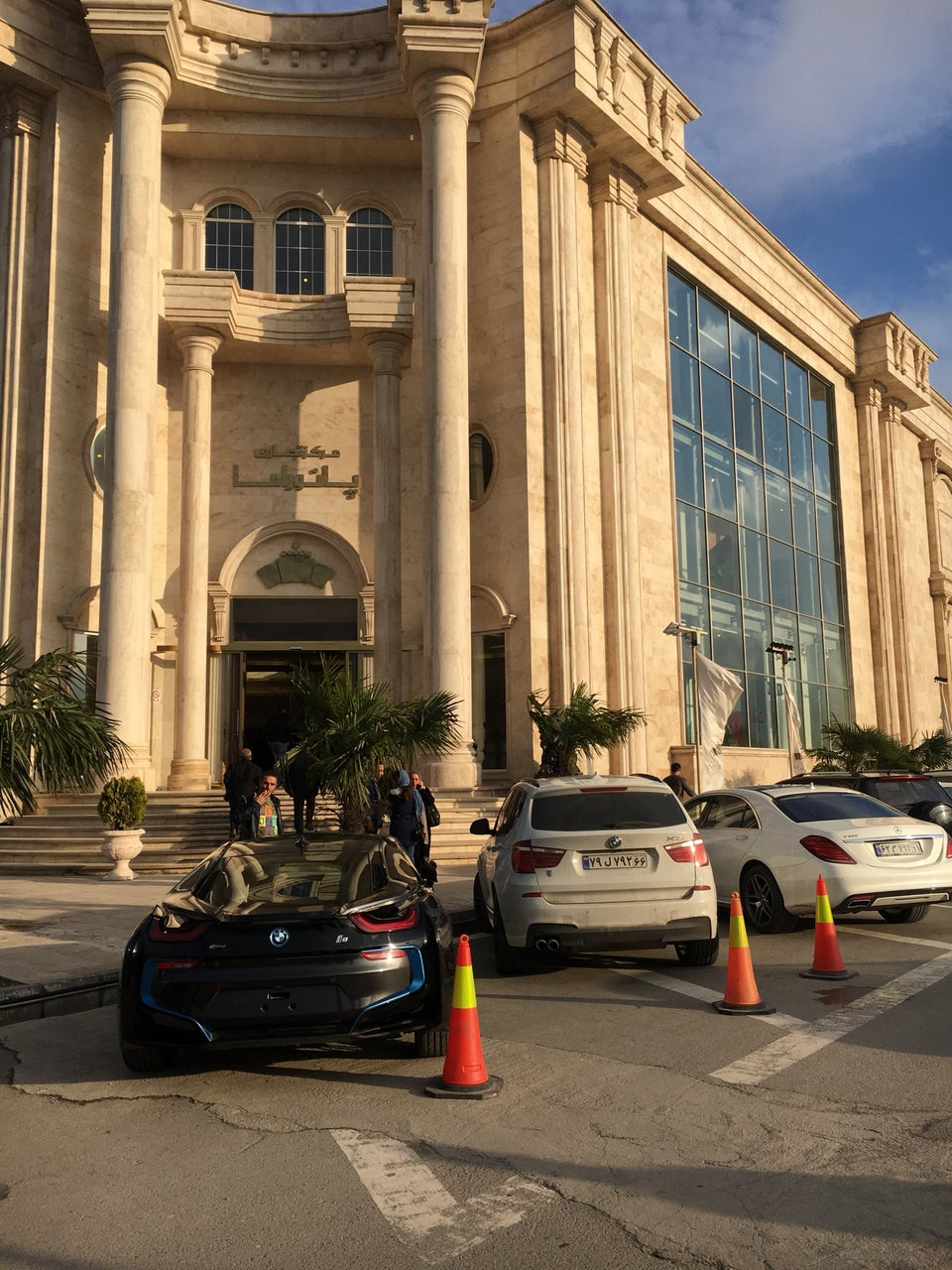
- Shopping center in Kelarabad

- Location within Iran
- Coordinates: 36°41′50″N 51°15′09″E
- Country: Iran
- Province: Mazandaran
- County: Abbasabad
- District: Kelar
- Established as a city: 1975

Government
  - Mayor: Mehrdad Rudbarkelari

Population (2016)
  - Total: 6,267
- Time zone: UTC+3:30 (IRST)
- Website: kelarabad.ir

Kelarabad (Persian: كلارآباد) (Note: Also romanized as Kalārābād and Kelārābād) is a coastal city in, and the capital of, Kelar District in Abbasabad County, Mazandaran province, Iran. It is located between the Caspian Sea in the north and the northern slopes of Alborz mountains in the south.

== Demographics ==
=== Language ===
Kelarabad's people speak the Kalarestaqi dialect of Mazandarani.

=== Population ===
At the time of the 2006 National Census, the city's population was 5,457 in 1,515 households, when it was in the former Abbasabad District of Tonekabon County. The following census in 2011 counted 5,926 people in 1,821 households, by which time the district had been separated from the county in the establishment of Abbasabad County. The city was transferred to the new Kelarabad District. (Note: Renamed Salmanshahr District) The 2016 census measured the population of the city as 6,267 people in 2,099 households, when Kelarabad-e Sharqi Rural District (Note: Renamed Kelar-e Sharqi Rural District) and Kelarabad had been separated from the district in the formation of Kelar District.

== Neighborhoods ==
Kelarabad city consists of the following neighborhoods: Kelarabad-e Pain (near the Caspian sea), Kelarabad-e Bala, Khushamiyan, and Kiadeh. Villa townships in the city include Khushamiyan tourist town, Amirdasht township, and Enqelab township. Kelarabad also has several suburban villages such as Jisa-ye Kelarabad, Yalbandan, Yalbandan-e Sara, Charez, Espi Rud, and Golur-e Bala.
