= PhilNITS =

Philippine National IT Standards Foundation
- Abbreviation: PhilNITS
- Formation: April 10, 2002; 24 years ago
- Headquarters: Room 304 FMSG Building #9 Balete Drive cor 3rd St. New Manila, Quezon City 1112
- Location: Philippines
- Region served: Philippines
- President: Ma. Corazon M. Akol
- Affiliations: ITPEC
- Website: www.philnits.org

The Philippine National Information Technology Standards Foundation, Inc., or PhilNITS, is a non-stock, non-profit, non-government organization that is implementing in the Philippines the Information Technology standards adopted from Japan, with the support of the Department of Trade and Industry (DTI) of the Philippines and the Ministry of Economy, Trade and Industry (METI) of Japan.

== History ==
PhilNITS was initially known as the Japanese IT Standards Exams of the Philippines Foundation, Inc. (JITSE-Phil), and was registered as such with the Securities and Exchange Commission on April 10, 2002, and set up its office at the Penthouse of the Prince Bldg, in Rada Street, Legazpi Village, Makati,

A week after its incorporation, the Japan IT Engineers Examination Center (JITEC) represented by its president, Mr. Takao Tominaga, signed a mutual recognition agreement (MRA) with the JITSE-Phil Foundation, represented by its Founding President, Ms. Ma. Corazon M. Akol in ceremonies held at the Makati Shangri-La, Manila Hotel and witnessed by Ambassador Ara of Japan, Secretary Mar Roxas of the Department of Trade and Industry, Chairman Virgilio Pena of Information Technology and E-Commerce Council (now Commission on Information and Communications Technology), Mr. Yoshikai, Deputy Director General of the Ministry of Economy, Trade and Industry, and Mr. Sakai, Commercial Attaché of Japan to the Philippines.

DTI started to support JITSE-Phil in 2003 by providing it with its office space at the Oppen Building in Makati, in 2005, at the WDC Building in Cebu City and in 2007, at the Mintrade Bldg. in Davao City.

With the MRA between JITEC and JITSE-Phil, it was able to receive technical support from Japan. JITEC has been providing guidance, training, necessary hardware/software programs, and the documentation required in implementing the Standards on the Fundamentals of IT (FE) and in Software Design and Development (SW).

On May 29, 2003, the Bureau of Product Standards (BPS) of the Department of Trade and Industry (DTI), after due consultation with the National Computer Center (NCC), accepted JITSE as the Phil. National Standard - PNS 2030:2003 Information Technology Engineers Skills Standards.

On May 30, 2003, after an evaluation of the results of the First Certification Exams conducted by JITSE-Phil on the Fundamentals of IT Engineers (FE), the Ministry of Justice of Japan recognized JITSE as the Philippine Nihon Joho Gijutsu Hyojun Shiken Zaidan. With this official recognition by the Ministry of Justice, the FE Certificate, more popularly called the JITSE Certificate, can be used as a valid document for processing the work visas of IT professionals bound for Japan.

With the Asia IT Initiative Program (AITI) of METI, JITSE-Phil was able to receive technical support from Japan through the Japan External Trade Organization (JETRO), the Association for Overseas Technical Scholarships (AOTS) and the Center of the International Cooperation on Computerization (CICC).

JETRO has provided JITSE-Phil since 2003, through the Japan Expert Service Abroad (JEXSA) Project, technical experts and the training facilities in its offices in Makati, Cebu, and Davao. AOTS has provided Training Courses in the Philippines (in the various offices of JITSE-Phil as well as in some schools in provinces where JITSE-Phil has no Training Center) and have awarded scholarships for training in Japan.

On August 31, 2004. JITSE-Phil changed its name to PhilNITS Foundation to correct the misconception that the standards being implemented only for the Japanese market but for Asia.

In the ITEE Conference held at the AOTS Yokohama Kenshu Center, JITEC and the 6 organizations with mutual recognition agreements (MRAs) with JITEC, decided to form the Information Technology Professional Examination Council or ITPEC. The members of ITPEC are: the Japan Information Technology Examination Center (JITEC) of Japan, the Multimedia Technology Enhancement & Operations Sendirian Berhad (METEOR) of Malaysia, the Myanmar Computer Federation (MCF) of Myanmar, the Japan-Mongolian Information Technology Association (JMITA) of Mongolia, (now replaced by the National IT Park, NITP), the Philippine National IT Standards Foundation (PhilNITS) of the Philippines, the National Electronics and Computer technology Center (NECTEC) of Thailand, and the Vietnam Information Technology Examination and Training Support Center (VITEC) of Vietnam. In this Agreement, the members decided to have a common exam, on the same agreed upon date and time, and to recognize each other’s Certificate. ITPEC members have been using the same logo to raise public recognition of the examination and have adopted a common marketing strategy. JITEC-IPA expects to establish multi-lateral mutual recognition agreements, and transform ITPEC into a fully Asia-wide organization.

Through Grants from AOTS, PhilNITS has trained 8,174 IT Professionals in the Philippines and has sent 197 scholars to Japan. CICC has provided several Training programs as well as an e Learning System consisting of the hardware (2 servers and 4 terminals), the software (that can accommodate a maximum of 2000 users) and contents consisting of 24 modules developed by JITEC and CICC and 1 module developed by the Thomson Learning Center, donated by Fujitsu to PhilNITS. All the modules are made available to the public, 24 hours a day, 7 days a week through a subscription fee of ₱500.00 per month.

== Current Certifications ==
The ITPEC certification exams (known locally as PhilNITS certification exams) are administered as written below. Currently there are three levels of examination being administered by PhilNITS. Topics covered by the exams are those of technology, strategy and management. IT professionals who pass these certification examinations are certified for life. An IT professional may take directly the certification level he/she would want to take. There is no limit to the number of times you take the examinations until you pass the exams.

=== ITPEC Fundamentals of IT Passport Exam (IP Exam, Level 1) ===
Known locally as PhilNITS IP, the Information Technology Passport Exam is for individuals who have basic knowledge in IT that all business workers should commonly possess, and who are doing information technology related tasks or trying to utilize IT related technology in their tasks. The exam duration is 120 minutes or 2 hours (conducted during a morning schedule). It consists of 100 questions in multiple choice (one per four choices) broke down into two types: the short question type, one question per item, 88 questions; and medium question type, four questions per item, 12 questions (3 items).

The pilot examination was conducted last March 28, 2010. The first regular exam was conducted last October 24, 2010. This exam is conducted twice a year in last Sunday of April and last Sunday of October.

=== ITPEC Fundamentals of IT Engineers Exam (FE Exam, Level 2) ===
Known locally as PhilNITS FE, this exam is conducted twice a year in the last Sunday of April and last Sunday of October. The 300 minute (150 minutes in the morning and 150 minutes in the afternoon) multiple choice examination are administered in 10 exam centers in the Philippines: University of Baguio for the north Luzon area, Philippine Christian University in Manila, Ateneo de Naga University for the Bicol Region, University of San Carlos in Cebu and Holy Name University in Bohol, Lorma Colleges in La Union and Leyte Academic Center for the Visayas region, and for Mindanao: Capitol University in Cagayan de Oro, Ateneo de Zamboanga University in Zamboanga City and the University of the Immaculate Conception in Davao City.

The Fundamental IT Engineers Exam is for individuals who have basic fundamental knowledge and skills required to be an advance IT human resource, who possess practical utilization abilities. Those who fail either the morning or afternoon part of the exam are given another chance to take the removal exam after which they will have to take the entire test again. This means two chances to pass the exam.

=== ITPEC Applied Information Technology Exam (AP Exam, Level 3) ===
Known locally as PhilNITS AP is conducted once a year on the last Sunday of October. The multiple choice exam is for 300 minutes (150 minutes in the morning and 150 minutes in the afternoon). This examination is for individuals who have applied knowledge and skills required to be an advanced IT human resource, and who have established their own direction as an advanced IT human resource. It is ideally given to people who have at least two years work experience.

== Other projects ==
- Conducting free training courses on IP, FE & AP/SW for teachers and commercial trainers. Usually funded by grants from AOTS, CICC, IPA, METI, and JETRO.
- Conducting free summer training of teachers, a joint undertaking with the Philippine Society of IT Educators (PSITE) and the Philippine Accrediting Association of Schools, Colleges and Universities (PAASCU). PAASCU is providing the venue and PhilNITS is providing the lecturers (from the PhilNITS Society).
- Providing training using the e-learning system donated by Japan.
- Guiding and helping in the development of the PhilNITS Society, an organization formed whose only criterion for membership is being PhilNITS-certified, in any exam category.
- Conducting software and hardware training. Customized training and assessment also available.
- Conducting Systems Development for Outsourced Projects. Work is done by Bridge Software Engineers who are Nihongo proficient.

== Board ==
Officers of PhilNITS are:

- Ms. Ma. Corazon M. Akol – President
- Mr. Peter Que Jr. – VP for Operations
- Mr. Shinichiro Kato – VP for Finance
- Ms. Flora Capili – Secretary.

== See also ==
- ITPEC - East Asia
- Open University Malaysia METEOR - Malaysia
- NECTEC - Thailand
