= Meduben =

Talling best mountain namakabrud

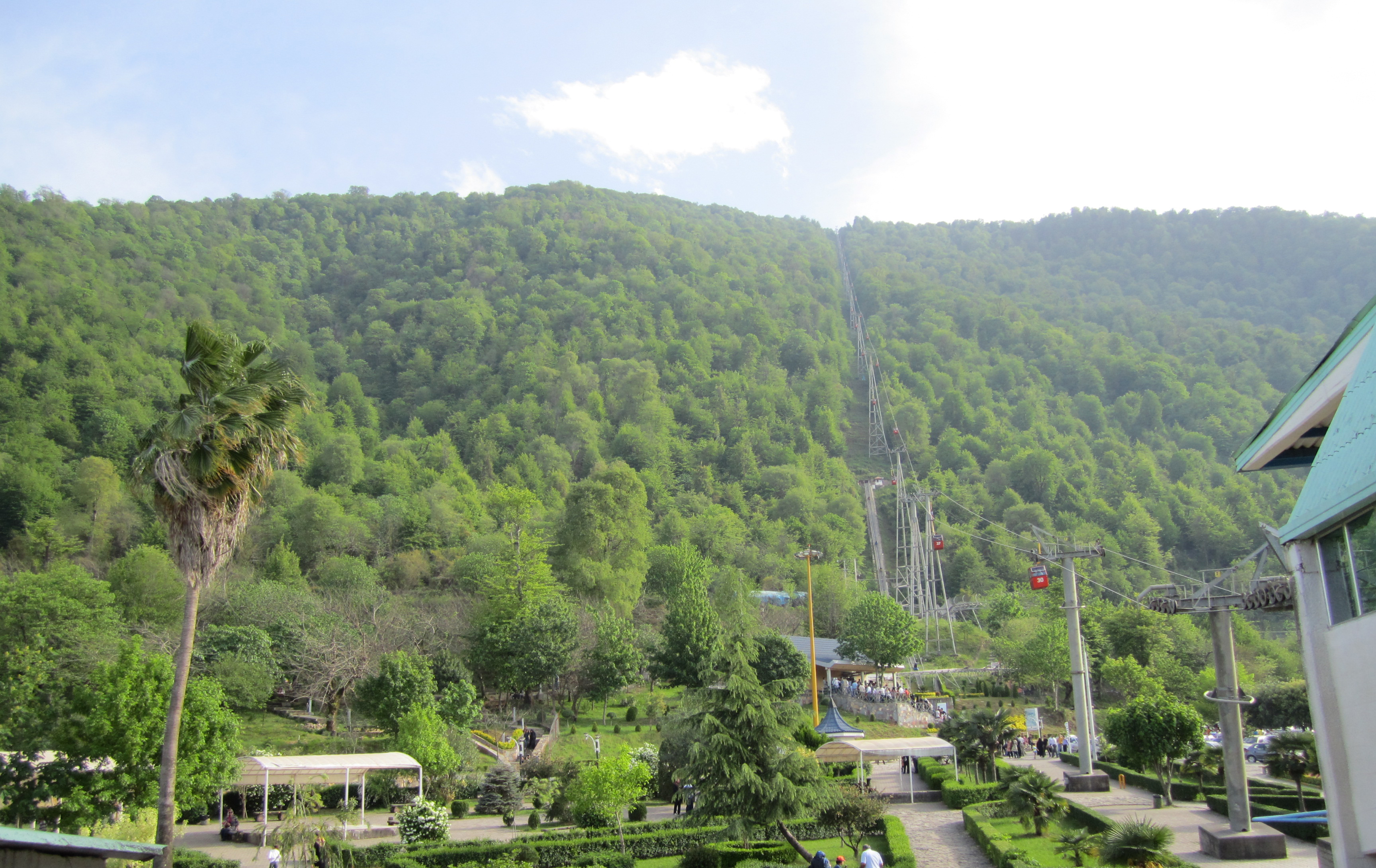
- Namakabrud telecabin, Mount meduben

Highest point
- Elevation: 1,009 m (3,310 ft)
- Coordinates: 36°37′34″N 51°18′53″E

Geography
- Location within Iran
- Location: Mazandaran, Iran
- Parent range: Alborz

Meduben (Persian: مدوبن), or Maduben is a hyrcanius mountain peak in Alborz range in Northern Iran. The prominence is 283m/928 ft. This mountain peak is located at an altitude of 1,009 metres (3,310 ft), overlooking the Namakab Rud town to the north, and the Kelardasht city to the far south.

== Gandola lift ==
Namakab Rud telecabin, with a height of 700 meters above sea level, offers a unique view of Mount meduben. There are several restaurants and recreational facilities at the top of meduben peak that cater to the needs of tourists.
