= Japan Institute for Promotion of Digital Economy and Community =

Nonprofit foundation in Tokyo, Japan

- Abbreviation: JIPDEC
- Formation: December 20, 1967; 58 years ago
- Type: General incorporated foundation (Foundation (nonprofit))
- Headquarters: Roppongi First Building, 9-9 Roppongi 1-chome, Minato-ku Tokyo, 106-0032 Japan
- Official language: Japanese
- President: Tsutomu Makino
- Budget: ¥2.595 million (FY 2017)
- Staff: 100 (April 2017)
- Website: english.jipdec.or.jp
- Formerly called: Japan Information Processing Development Corporation

Japan Institute for Promotion of Digital Economy and Community (JIPDEC or 一般財団法人日本情報経済社会推進協会 in Japanese) is a nonprofit foundation for development of key IT technologies and policies, as related to the Ministry of Internal Affairs and Communications and Ministry of Economy, Trade and Industry (METI). The promotion of information processing by computers is JIPDEC's objective.

== General information ==
The JIPDEC was established on 20 December 1967 as ″Japan Information Processing Development Corporation″. The Japan Computer Usage Development Institute (CUDI) and the Institute of Information Technology (IIT) were incorporated into JIPDEC in April 1976. In April 2011 the JIPDEC became a general incorporated foundation governed by the ″Act on Authorization of Public Interest Incorporated Associations and Public Interest Incorporated Foundations″. The organization was renamed to ″Japan Institute for Promotion of Digital Economy and Community (JIPDEC)″.

The JIPDEC is known for their contributions to security and privacy issues. The JIPDEC is part of the accreditation process for the certification of several management systems. Based on the ″Act on the Protection of Personal Information (APPI)″ of 2005 the PrivacyMark System helps private enterprises to fulfill the compliance with Japanese Industrial Standards JIS Q 15001:2006 Personal Information Protection Management System - Requirements on Personal Information Protection Management Systems (PMS). Other management systems like ISO/IEC 27001-based JIS Q 27001 Information Security Management Systems (ISMS), ISO/IEC 20000-based Information Technology Service Management Systems (ITSMS) and Business Continuity Management Systems (BCMS) can show compliance with further legislative acts. Furthermore, the JIPDEC has developed and is ″developing new mechanisms for the use of electronic information″.

== See also ==
For the IT related organizations and consortiums in Japan, see:

- Japan Information Industry Association (JISA)
- Computer Entertainment Suppliers' Association (CESA)
- Japan Users Association of Information Systems
- Japan Telemarketing Association (JTA)
- Japan Data Center Council
- JEIDA (Japan Electronic Industries Development Association)
