= Information-Technology Engineers Examination =

Group of Japanese computing examinations

The Information-Technology Engineers Examination (Japanese: 情報処理技術者試験, Hepburn: jōhō shori gijutsusha shiken; or ITEE) is a group of information technology examinations administered by the Innovation Platform Agency, Japan (IPA). The ITEE was introduced in 1969 by Japan's Ministry of International Trade and Industry (MITI), and it has since changed hands twice, first to the Japan Information Processing Development Corporation (JIPDEC) in 1984, and then to the IPA in 2004. At first there were two examination categories, one for lower-level programmers and one for upper-level programmers, and over the years the number of categories increased to twelve as of 2016.

The examinations are carried out during the course of one day; candidates sit a morning test and an afternoon test. The morning test assesses the breadth of the candidate's subject-matter knowledge, and the afternoon test assesses the candidate's ability to apply that knowledge. The examinations have a low pass rate: between 1969 and 2010 15.4 million people took them, but only 1.7 million were successful (an average success rate of 11 percent).

The questions are developed by a committee of experts, and are continually updated to reflect changes in the computer industry. The examination categories are also subject to change based upon industry trends. The ITEE examinations are recognized as qualifications in several Asian countries, including India, Singapore, South Korea, China, the Philippines, Thailand, Vietnam, Myanmar, Taiwan, and Bangladesh.

== History ==
The Information Technology Engineers Examination was founded in 1969 as a national examination by Japan's Ministry of International Trade and Industry (MITI). At first, two categories of examination were offered: Class I Information Technology Engineer, aimed at upper-level programmers, and Class II Information Technology Engineer, aimed at lower level programmers. These two categories were followed in 1971 by the Special Information Technology Engineer Examination.

In 1984, MITI (then known as the Ministry of Economy, Trade and Industry, or METI) handed over the administration of the examinations to Japan Information Processing Development Corporation (JIPDEC). JIPDEC received most of its funding from METI, and while the two organizations were technically independent, they shared close ties with each other. JIPDEC founded the Japan Information Technology Engineers Examination Center (JITEC) to oversee the actual running of the examinations.

The 1980s saw the introduction of two new examination categories: the Information Technology Systems Audit Engineer Examination in 1986, and the Online Information Technology Engineer Examination in 1988. The former was aimed at systems auditors, and the latter at network engineers.

The examination categories underwent a major upheaval in 1994. The Special Information Technology Engineer Examination was expanded into four separate examinations: the Applications Engineer Examination, the Systems Analyst Examination, the Project Manager Examination, and the Systems Administration Engineer Examination. The Online Information Technology Engineer Examination became the Network Specialist Examination, the Information Technology Systems Auditor Examination became the Systems Auditor Examination, and three new categories of examination were introduced: the Production Engineer Examination, the Database Specialist Examination, and the Basic Systems Administrator Examination. These were followed by a further two new categories in 1996: the Advanced Systems Administrator Examination and the Applied Microcontroller Systems Engineer Examination.

There was another major change to the categories in 2001. The Class I Information Technology Engineer Examination became the Fundamental Information Technology Engineer Examination, and the Class II Information Technology Engineer became the Applied Information Technology Engineer Examination. The Production Engineer Examination was discontinued, and the Information Security Administrator Examination was introduced.

In 2004, the administration of the examinations changed hands from JIPDEC to the Innovation Platform Agency, Japan (IPA). This was followed in 2006 by the introduction of a new examination category, the Technical Engineer (Information Security) Examination.

2009 saw the introduction of a new test, the IT Passport Examination, while others examination categories were consolidated. The Systems Analyst Examination and the Advanced Systems Administrator Examination were merged to form the IT Strategist Examination, and the Technical Engineer (Information Security) Examination and the Information Security Administrator Examination were merged to form the Information Security Specialist Examination.

== Format ==
The examinations are all carried out in one day, with a morning test and an afternoon tests. The morning test is multiple choice, and aims to test the candidate's breadth of knowledge of the material being examined. The afternoon test tests the candidate's ability to apply that knowledge and with a series of case studies and essay questions. The afternoon test also aims to test the candidate's past experience.

After the examinations are over, candidates are allowed to take their question papers home with them, and the answers to some of the questions are made available online. Candidates who pass the examinations receive certificates from METI. These certificates show the date that they were awarded, but they have no expiration date.

Between 1969 and 2010, 15.4 million people took one of the ITEE examinations, and only 1.7 million people passed, giving an average success rate of 11 percent.

== Categories ==
As of July 2016 there are 13 examination categories, divided into four levels.

Level	Outline	Examination	Abbreviation
Level 4	Advanced knowledge and skills	Information Technology Strategist Examination	ST
Level 4	Advanced knowledge and skills	Systems Architect Examination	SA
Level 4	Advanced knowledge and skills	Project Manager Examination	PM
Level 4	Advanced knowledge and skills	Network Specialist Examination	NW
Level 4	Advanced knowledge and skills	Database Specialist Examination	DB
Level 4	Advanced knowledge and skills	Embedded Systems Specialist Examination	ES
Level 4	Advanced knowledge and skills	Information Security Specialist Examination	SC
Level 4	Advanced knowledge and skills	Information Technology Service Manager Examination	SM
Level 4	Advanced knowledge and skills	Systems Auditor Examination	AU
Level 3	Applied knowledge and skills	Applied Information Technology Engineer Examination	AP
Level 2	Fundamental knowledge and skills for promoting the safe utilization of IT	Information Security Management Examination	SG
Level 2	Fundamental knowledge and skills	Fundamental Information Technology Engineer Examination	FE
Level 1	Common and basic knowledge for utilizing IT for all business persons	Information Technology Passport Examination	IP

== Administration ==
JITEC bases the scope and the difficulty of the exams on the advice of a committee of experts from the computer industry and from academia. This committee investigates the skills currently used by engineers in the relevant examination category, and uses that to base their recommendations on. In this way, the questions in the exams are kept up to date with new and evolving technologies. The knowledge areas that are tested are taken from software engineering, information systems and computer science.

The examination categories are also constantly reviewed to ensure that they are both relevant to current trends in information technology and to keep them consistent with previous exams.

The examination questions themselves are also developed by committee consisting of around 400 experts. Subcommittees are put in charge of question development, of checking, and of question selection, and are given independent authority to create questions. New questions are made for each exam, but some questions intended to test the breadth of candidates' knowledge may be altered and reused.

In addition to its national examination status in Japan, the ITEE is also recognized as a professional credential in several Asian countries, including India, Singapore, South Korea, China, the Philippines, Thailand, Vietnam, Myanmar, Taiwan, and Bangladesh.
