= Sajadiyeh, Kerman =

Sajadiyeh سجاديه
- Village
- Country: Iran
- Province: Kerman
- County: Rafsanjan
- Bakhsh: Central
- Rural District: Razmavaran

Population (2006)
  - Total: 689
- Time zone: UTC+3:30 (IRST)
  - Summer (DST): UTC+4:30 (IRDT)

Sajadiyeh (Persian: سجاديه, also Romanized as Sajādīyeh) is a village in Razmavaran Rural District, in the Central District of Rafsanjan County, Kerman Province, Iran. At the 2006 census, its population was 689, in 151 families.
