= Sajjadiyeh, Khuzestan =

Sajjadiyeh سجاديه
- Village
- Location within Iran
- Coordinates: 31°36′24″N 48°37′13″E
- Country: Iran
- Province: Khuzestan
- County: Ahvaz
- Bakhsh: Central
- Rural District: Elhayi

Population (2006)
  - Total: 124
- Time zone: UTC+3:30 (IRST)
  - Summer (DST): UTC+4:30 (IRDT)

Sajjadiyeh (Persian: سجاديه, also Romanized as Sajjādīyeh) is a village in Elhayi Rural District, in the Central District of Ahvaz County, Khuzestan Province, Iran. At the 2006 census, its population was 124, in 27 families.
