= Japan Information Industry Association =

Japan Information Industry Association (JISA)
- Formation: 1984; 42 years ago
- Headquarters: Tokyo, Japan
- Members: 650 regular members and 70 associate members
- Official language: Japanese
- Chairperson: Tomokazu HAMAGUCHI
- Website: http://www.jisa.or.jp/e/

Japan Information Industry Association (JISA or 情報サービス産業協会 in Japanese) was established in 1984 as a merger of two organizations and is the largest non-profit organization of Japan's IT industry, related to the Japanese Ministry of Economy, Trade and Industry (METI).

== History ==
Japan Information Industry Association (JISA) is the largest non-profit organization of Japan's IT industry, related to the Japanese Ministry of Economy, Trade and Industry (METI). It was established in 1984 as a merger of Japan Information Center Association and Software Industry Promotion Association.

JISA now has 650 regular members and 70 associate members, as of May, 2007. The Chairperson is Tomokazu Hamaguchi, former CEO of NTT Data, elected in May 2007.
