= Namakab Rud =

Namakab Rud نمكاب‌رود
- Town
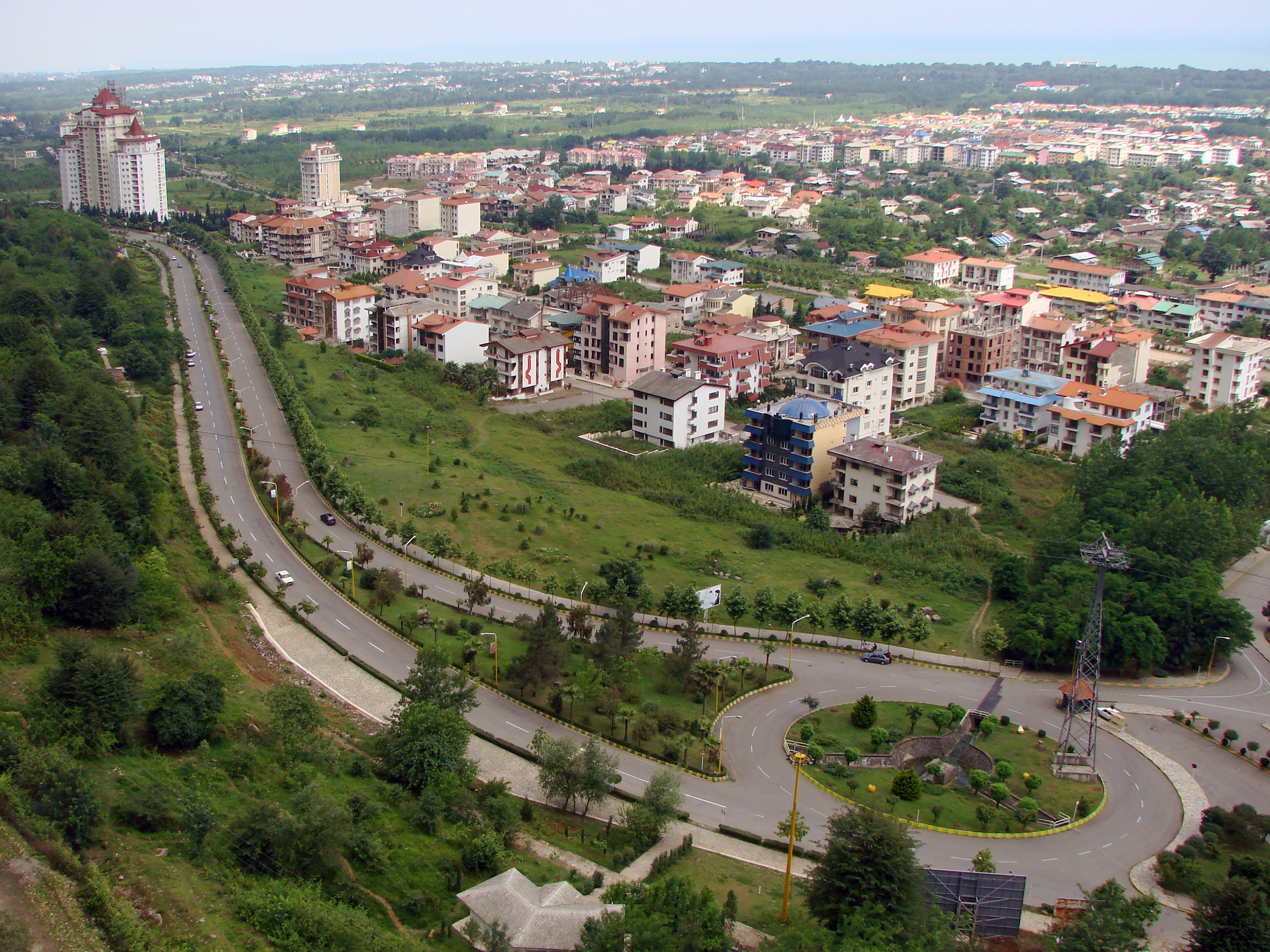

- Location within Iran
- Coordinates: 36°41′52″N 51°16′48″E
- Country: Iran
- Province: Mazandaran
- County: Chalus
- Bakhsh: Central
- Rural District: Kelarestaq-e Gharbi

Population (2006)
  - Total: 354
- Time zone: UTC+3:30 (IRST)
- Website: https://www.namakabrud.ir

Namakâb Rud (Persian: شهرك نمکاب‌رود, also Romanized as Shahrak-e Namakâb Rud; also known as Namak Âbrud, Namakâbrud, Namakâbrud Sar, and Nur Sar) is a resort town in Kelarestaq-e Gharbi Rural District, in the Central District of Chalus County, Mazandaran Province, Iran.

== Geography and Divisions ==
Located 12 km from East Chalus is new Namakabrud township covering some 650 hectares, with the Caspian sea on its north and hyrcanius Meduben on its south.

The town is divided into a tourist and a residential section. The residential part consists of 8 neighborhoods and is designed for a tourist population of up to 100,000 people, and the entrance roads of residential neighborhoods are separated from other parts of the town. The tourism sector has many recreational facilities, such as Namakabrud amusement park, Namakabrud telecabin lines 1 and 2, sledding, ziplines, ATV karting, adventure park, shooting club, etc.

There are numerous villa cities around it which form a vacation region for the people of Tehran and Karaj.

== Population ==
At the 2006 census, its population was 354, consisting of 71 families. Decreased to 83 people and 25 households in 2016 census.

== Climate ==
Namakab Rud has a humid subtropical climate (Köppen: Cfa, Trewartha: Cf), with warm, humid summers and cool, damp winters.

== Gondola lift ==
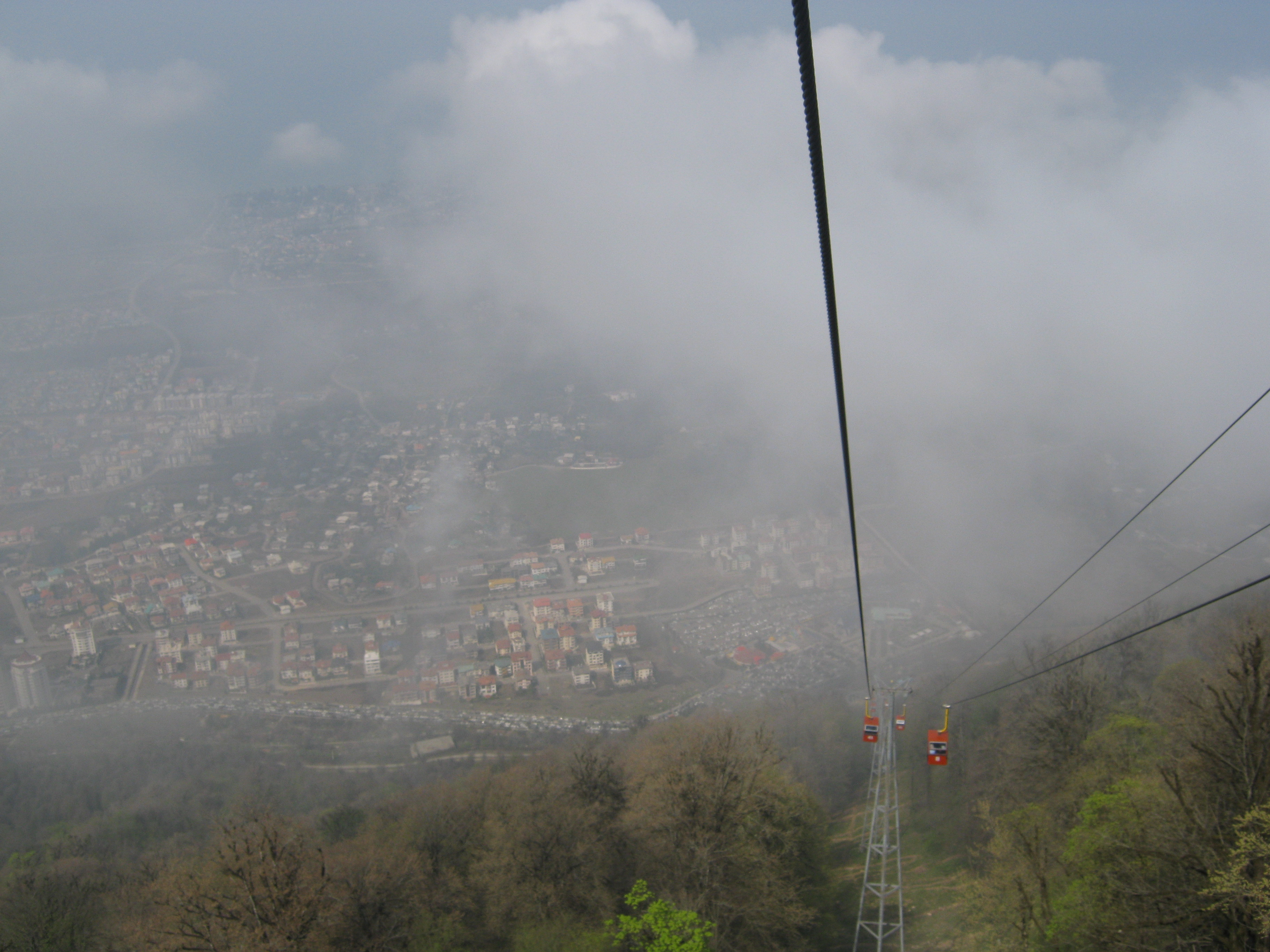
Namakab Rud tramway

Namakab Rud is a tourist town and has an aerial tramway which starts at the sea level near the shores of the Caspian Sea and ends on the top of the Alborz mountains heights crossing dense forest area of Northern Iran.

== See also ==
- Sardab Rud
- Greater Tehran
