= Kelar-e Sharqi Rural District =

Rural district in Mazandaran province, Iran

Kelar-e Sharqi Rural District Persian: دهستان کلار شرقی
- Rural District
- Location within Iran
- Coordinates: 36°39′N 51°16′E
- Country: Iran
- Province: Mazandaran
- County: Abbasabad
- District: Kelar
- Established: 2009
- Capital: Charez

Population (2016)
  - Total: 2,409
- Time zone: UTC+3:30 (IRST)

Kelar-e Sharqi Rural District (Persian: دهستان کلار شرقی) (Note: Formerly Kelarabad-e Sharqi Rural District (دهستان كلارآباد شرقی)) is in Kelar District of Abbasabad County, Mazandaran province, Iran. Its capital is the village of Charez.

== History ==
In 2009, Abbasabad District was separated from Tonekabon County in the establishment of Abbasabad County, which was divided into two districts of two rural districts each, with the city of Abbasabad as its capital. Kelarabad-e Sharqi Rural District (Note: Renamed Kelar-e Sharqi Rural District) was created in the new Kelarabad District. (Note: Renamed Salmanshahr District)

In 2012, the rural district and the city of Kelarabad were separated from the district in the formation of Kelar District. The rural district was renamed Kelar-e Sharqi Rural District.

== Demographics ==
=== Population ===
At the time of the 2011 National Census, the rural district's population (as Kelarabad-e Sharqi Rural District of Kelarabad District) was 4,261 inhabitants in 1,354 households. The 2016 census measured the population of the rural district as 2,409 in 795 households, by which time it had been separated from the district in the formation of Kelar District and renamed Kelar-e Sharqi Rural District. The most populous of its six villages was Charez, with 978 people.

=== Other villages in the rural district ===
- Espi Rud
- Jisa-ye Kelarabad
- Yalbandan
- Yalbandan-e Sara
