= Abbasabad, Mazandaran =

City in Mazandaran province, Iran

Abbasabad Persian: عباس آباد
- City
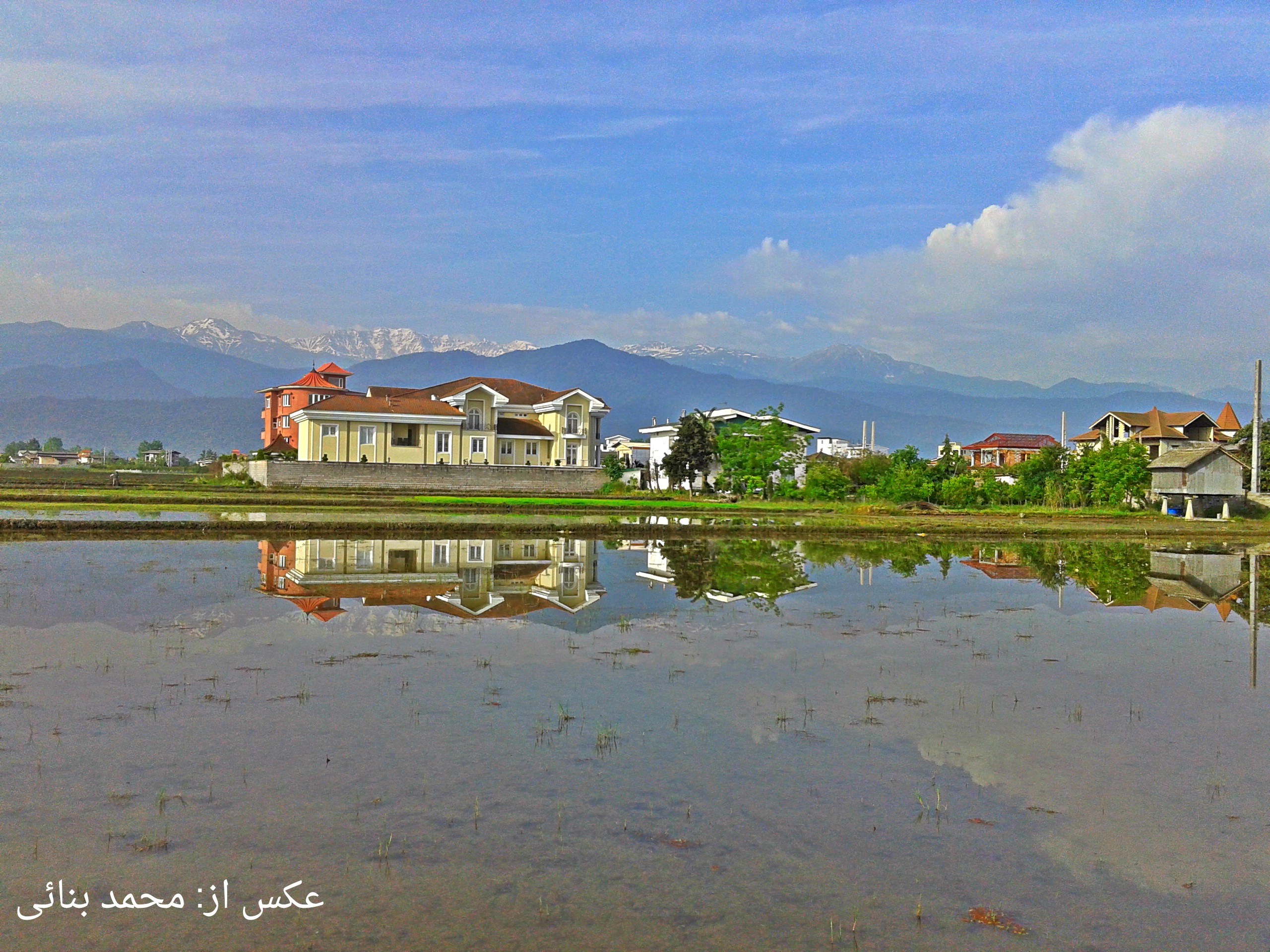
- Abbasabad, 2014

- Location within Iran
- Coordinates: 36°43′37″N 51°06′18″E
- Country: Iran
- Province: Mazandaran
- County: Abbasabad
- District: Central

Population (2016)
  - Total: 13,482
- Time zone: UTC+3:30 (IRST)

Abbasabad (Persian: عباس آباد) (Note: Also romanized as ‘Abbāsābād; formerly Varaak or Veresk (وَرسَك)) is a city in the Central District of Abbasabad County, Mazandaran province, Iran, serving as capital of both the county and the district.

== Demographics ==
=== Population ===
At the time of the 2006 National Census, the city's population was 11,256 in 3,195 households, when it was capital of the former Abbasabad District in Tonekabon County. The following census in 2011 counted 11,599 people in 3,620 households, by which time the district had been separated from the county in the establishment of Abbasabad County. Abbasabad was transferred to the new Central District as the county's capital. The 2016 census measured the population of the city as 13,482 people in 4,500 households.
