= Langarud-e Sharqi Rural District =

Rural district in Mazandaran province, Iran

Langarud-e Sharqi Rural District Persian: دهستان لنگارود شرقی
- Rural District
- Location within Iran
- Coordinates: 36°39′N 51°07′E
- Country: Iran
- Province: Mazandaran
- County: Abbasabad
- District: Central
- Established: 1987
- Capital: Seyyed Mahalleh

Population (2016)
  - Total: 8,943
- Time zone: UTC+3:30 (IRST)

Langarud-e Sharqi Rural District (Persian: دهستان لنگارود شرقی) (Note: Formerly Langarud Rural District (دهستان لنگارود)) is in the Central District of Abbasabad County, Mazandaran province, Iran. Its capital is the village of Seyyed Mahalleh.

== Demographics ==
=== Population ===
At the time of the 2006 National Census, the rural district's population (as Langarud Rural District of the former Abbasabad District in Tonekabon County) was 10,839 in 2,985 households. There were 8,529 inhabitants in 2,596 households at the following census of 2011, by which time the district had been separated from the county in the establishment of Abbasabad County. The rural district was transferred to the new Central District and renamed Langarud-e Sharqi Rural District. The 2016 census measured the population of the rural district as 8,943 in 2,954 households. The most populous of its 18 villages was Hamzehabad, with 1,740 people.

=== Other villages in the rural district ===
- Bauj Kheyl
- Darasara
- Gerd Ab
- Heydarabad
- Kazem Kola
- Khashkala
- Khezrabad
- Kola Kardeh
- Masha Allahabad
- Mashhadi Sara
- Palang Kola
- Sajadiyeh
- Sarlanga
- Shoja Mahalleh
- Talesh Kheyl
- Ziarat Var
