= Kelar District =

District in Mazandaran province, Iran

Kelar District Persian: بخش کلار
- District
- Location within Iran
- Coordinates: 36°39′N 51°14′E
- Country: Iran
- Province: Mazandaran
- County: Abbasabad
- Established: 2012
- Capital: Kelarabad

Population (2016)
  - Total: 10,969
- Time zone: UTC+3:30 (IRST)

Kelar District (Persian: بخش کلار) is in Abbasabad County, Mazandaran province, Iran. Its capital is the city of Kelarabad.

== History ==
In 2009, Abbasabad District was separated from Tonekabon County in the establishment of Abbasabad County, which was divided into two districts of two rural districts each, with the city of Abbasabad as its capital.

In 2012, Kelarabad-e Sharqi Rural District (Note: Renamed Kelar-e Sharqi Rural District) and the city of Kelarabad were separated from Kelarabad District (Note: Renamed Salmanshahr District) in the formation of Kelar District.

== Demographics ==
=== Population ===
At the time of the 2016 National Census, the district's population was 10,969 inhabitants in 3,645 households.

=== Administrative divisions ===
Kelar District Population
Administrative Divisions	2016
Kelar-e Gharbi RD	2,293
Kelar-e Sharqi RD (Note: Formerly Kelarabad-e Sharqi Rural District)	2,409
Kelarabad (city)	6,267
Total	10,969
RD = Rural District
