= Kelarabad-e Gharbi Rural District =

Rural district in Mazandaran province, Iran

Kelarabad-e Gharbi Rural District Persian: دهستان کلارآباد غربی
- Rural District
- Location within Iran
- Coordinates: 36°39′N 51°11′E
- Country: Iran
- Province: Mazandaran
- County: Abbasabad
- District: Salmanshahr
- Established: 1990
- Capital: Tazehabad

Population (2016)
  - Total: 6,771
- Time zone: UTC+3:30 (IRST)

Kelarabad-e Gharbi Rural District (Persian: دهستان کلارآباد غربی) (Note: Formerly Kelarabad Rural District (دهستان کلارآباد)) is in Salmanshahr District (Note: Formerly Kelarabad District) of Abbasabad County, Mazandaran province, Iran. Its capital is the village of Tazehabad.

== Demographics ==
=== Population ===
At the time of the 2006 National Census, the rural district's population (as Kelarabad Rural District in the former Abbasabad District of Tonekabon County) was 8,445 in 2,394 households. There were 6,771 inhabitants in 2,196 households at the following census of 2011, by which time the district had been separated from the county in the establishment of Abbasabad County. The rural district was transferred to the new Kelarabad District (Note: Renamed Salmanshahr District) and renamed Kelarabad-e Gharbi Rural District. The 2016 census measured the population of the rural district as 6,771 in 2,196 households, when the district had been renamed Salmanshahr District. The most populous of Kelarabad-e Gharbi Rural District's 10 villages was Karatkuti, with 1,805 people.

=== Other villages in the rural district ===
- Chari
- Danial
- Gorji Sara
- Jisa-ye Danial
- Jisa-ye Khezrabad
- Salamat Sara
- Tila Kenar
