= Salmanshahr District =

District in Mazandaran province, Iran

Salmanshahr District Persian: بخش سلمانشهر
- District
- Location within Iran
- Coordinates: 36°39′N 51°11′E
- Country: Iran
- Province: Mazandaran
- County: Abbasabad
- Established: 2009
- Capital: Salman Shahr

Population (2016)
  - Total: 16,427
- Time zone: UTC+3:30 (IRST)

Salmanshahr District (Persian: بخش سلمانشهر) (Note: Formerly Kelarabad District (بخش كلار آباد)) is in Abbasabad County, Mazandaran province, Iran. Its capital is the city of Salman Shahr.

== History ==
In 2009, Abbasabad District was separated from Tonekabon County in the establishment of Abbasabad County, which was divided into two districts of two rural districts each, with the city of Abbasabad as its capital.

In 2012, Kelarabad-e Sharqi Rural District (Note: Renamed Kelar-e Sharqi Rural District) and the city of Kelarabad were separated from Kelarabad District in the formation of Kelar District, with the former renamed Salmanshahr District.

== Demographics ==
=== Population ===
At the time of the 2011 National Census, the district's population was 24,645 people in 7,532 households. The 2016 census measured the population of the district as 16,427 inhabitants in 5,253 households.

=== Administrative divisions ===
Salmanshahr District Population
Administrative Divisions	2011	2016
Kelarabad-e Gharbi RD (Note: Formerly Kelarabad Rural District)	5,804	6,771
Kelarabad-e Sharqi RD (Note: Transferred to Kelar District)	4,261	
Kelarabad (city)	5,926	
Salman Shahr (city)	8,654	9,656
Total	24,645	16,427
RD = Rural District
