= Central District (Abbasabad County) =

District in Mazandaran province, Iran

Central District (Abbasabad County) Persian: بخش مرکزی شهرستان عباس‌آباد
- District
- Location within Iran
- Coordinates: 36°39′N 51°06′E
- Country: Iran
- Province: Mazandaran
- County: Abbasabad
- Established: 2009
- Capital: Abbasabad

Population (2016)
  - Total: 25,436
- Time zone: UTC+3:30 (IRST)

The Central District of Abbasabad County (Persian: بخش مرکزی شهرستان عباس‌آباد) is in Mazandaran province, Iran. Its capital is the city of Abbasabad.

== History ==
In 2009, Abbasabad District was separated from Tonekabon County in the establishment of Abbasabad County, which was divided into two districts of two rural districts each, with Abbasabad as its capital.

== Demographics ==
=== Population ===
At the time of the 2011 National Census, the district's population was 22,946 people in 7,047 households. The 2016 census measured the population of the district as 25,436 inhabitants in 8,447 households.

=== Administrative divisions ===
Central District (Abbasabad County) Population
Administrative Divisions	2011	2016
Langarud-e Gharbi RD	2,818	3,011
Langarud-e Sharqi RD (Note: Formerly Langarud Rural District)	8,529	8,943
Abbasabad (city)	11,599	13,482
Total	22,946	25,436
RD = Rural District
