= Abbasabad County =

County in Mazandaran province, Iran

Abbasabad County Persian: شهرستان عباس‌آباد
- County
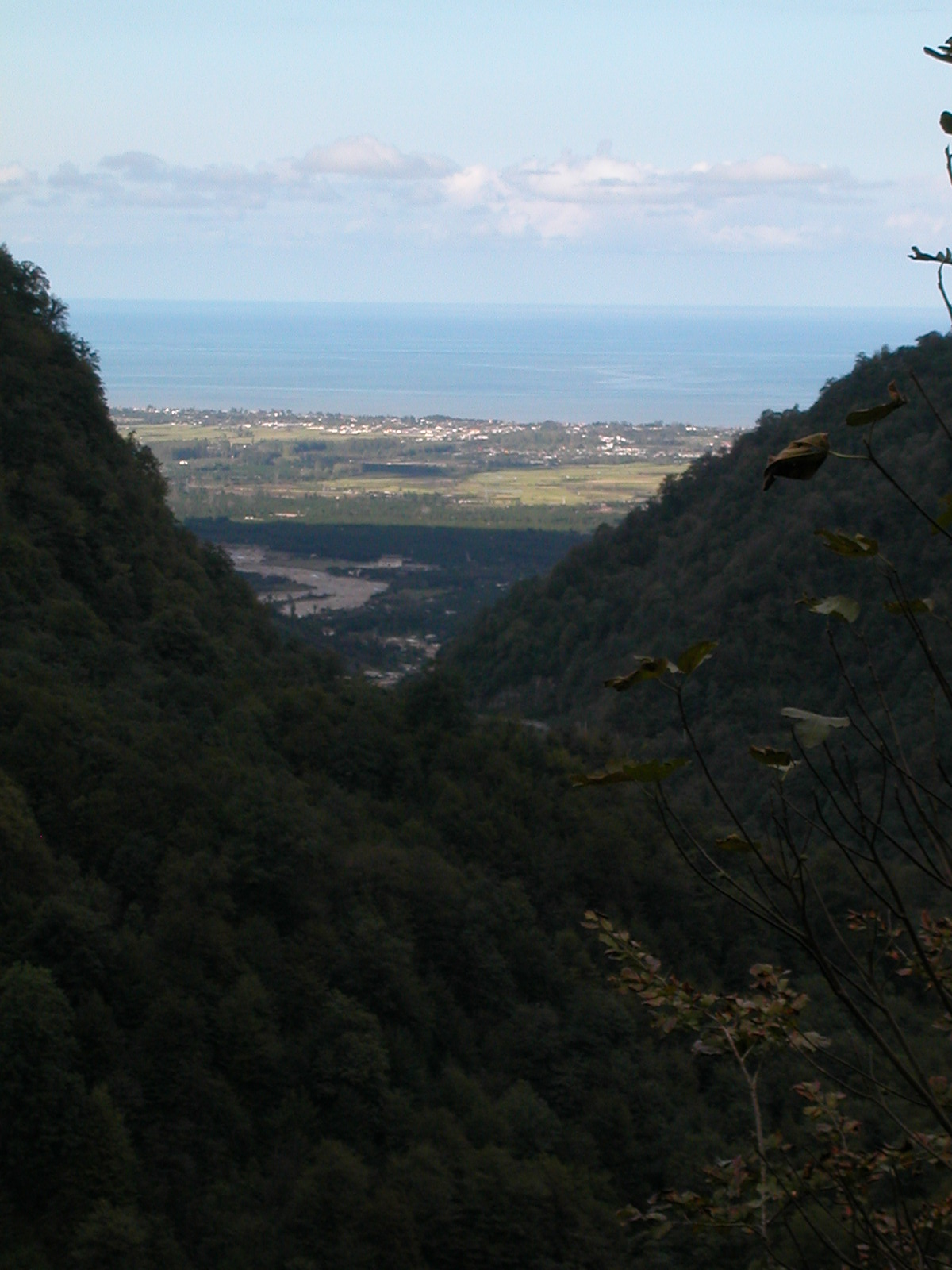
- Abbasabad County from Alborz mountains

- Location of Abbasabad County in Mazandaran province (left, pink)

- Location of Mazandaran province in Iran
- Coordinates: 36°39′N 51°10′E
- Country: Iran
- Province: Mazandaran
- Established: 2009
- Capital: Abbasabad
- Districts: Central, Kelar, Salman Shahr

Population (2016)
  - Total: 52,832
- Time zone: UTC+3:30 (IRST)

Abbasabad County (Persian: شهرستان عباس‌آباد) is in Mazandaran province, Iran. Its capital is the city of Abbasabad.

== History ==
In 2009, Abbasabad District was separated from Tonekabon County in the establishment of Abbasabad County, which was divided into two districts of two rural districts each, with Abbasabad as its capital.

In 2012, Kelarabad-e Sharqi Rural District (Note: Renamed Kelar-e Sharqi Rural District) and the city of Kelarabad were separated from Kelarabad District in the formation of Kelar District, which was divided into two rural districts, including the new Kelar-e Gharbi Rural District. Kelarabad District was renamed Salmanshahr District.

== Demographics ==
=== Population ===
At the time of the 2011 National Census, the county's population was 47,591 people in 14,568 households. The 2016 census measured the population of the county as 52,832 in 17,345 households.

=== Administrative divisions ===
Abbasabad County's population history and administrative structure over two consecutive censuses are shown in the following table.

Abbasabad County Population
Administrative Divisions	2011	2016
Central District	22,946	25,436
Langarud-e Gharbi RD	2,818	3,011
Langarud-e Sharqi RD (Note: Formerly Langarud Rural District)	8,529	8,943
Abbasabad (city)	11,599	13,482
Kelar District		10,969
Kelar-e Gharbi RD		2,293
Kelar-e Sharqi RD (Note: Formerly Kelarabad-e Sharqi Rural District)		2,409
Kelarabad (city)		6,267
Salmanshahr District (Note: Formerly Kelarabad District)	24,645	16,427
Kelarabad-e Gharbi RD (Note: Formerly Kelarabad Rural District)	5,804	6,771
Kelarabad-e Sharqi RD (Note: Renamed Kelar-e Sharqi Rural District)	4,261	
Kelarabad (city)	5,926	
Salman Shahr (city)	8,654	9,656
Total	47,591	52,832
RD = Rural District

== See also ==
Media related to Abbasabad County at Wikimedia Commons
