= Abbasabad District =

Former district in Mazandaran province, Iran

Abbasabad District Persian: بخش عباس‌آباد
- Former District
- Location within Iran
- Coordinates: 36°39′N 51°10′E
- Country: Iran
- Province: Mazandaran
- County: Tonekabon
- Capital: Abbasabad

Population (2006)
  - Total: 45,589
- Time zone: UTC+3:30 (IRST)

Abbasabad District (Persian: بخش عباس‌آباد) is a former administrative division of Tonekabon County, Mazandaran province, Iran. Its capital was the city of Abbasabad.

== History ==
In 2009, the district was separated from the county in the establishment of Abbasabad County.

== Demographics ==
=== Population ===
At the time of the 2006 National Census, the district's population was 45,589 in 12,694 households.

=== Administrative divisions ===
Abbasabad District Population
Administrative Divisions	2006
Kelarabad RD (Note: Renamed Kelarabad-e Gharbi Rural District)	8,445
Langarud RD (Note: Renamed Langarud-e Sharqi Rural District)	10,839
Abbasabad (city)	11,256
Kelarabad (city)	5,457
Salman Shahr (city)	9,592
Total	45,589
RD = Rural District
