= Razavi Khorasan province =

Province of Iran

Razavi Khorasan Province استان خراسان رضوی (Persian)
- Province
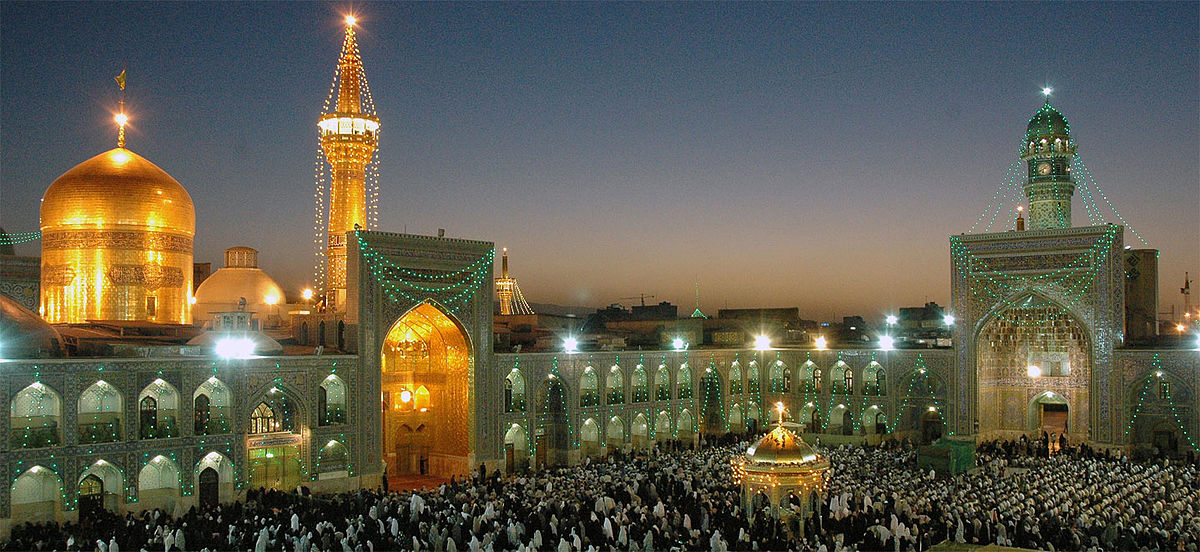
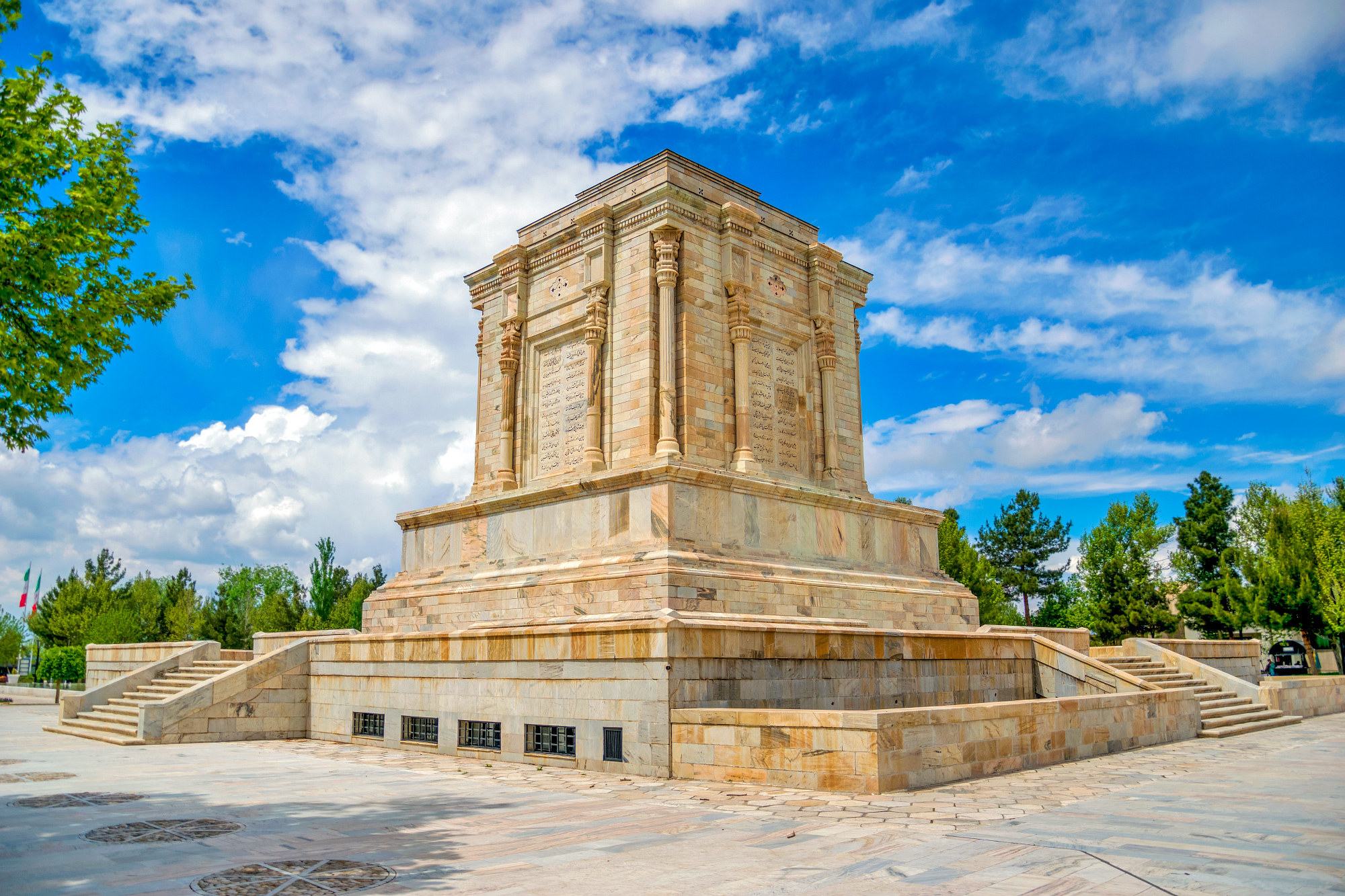
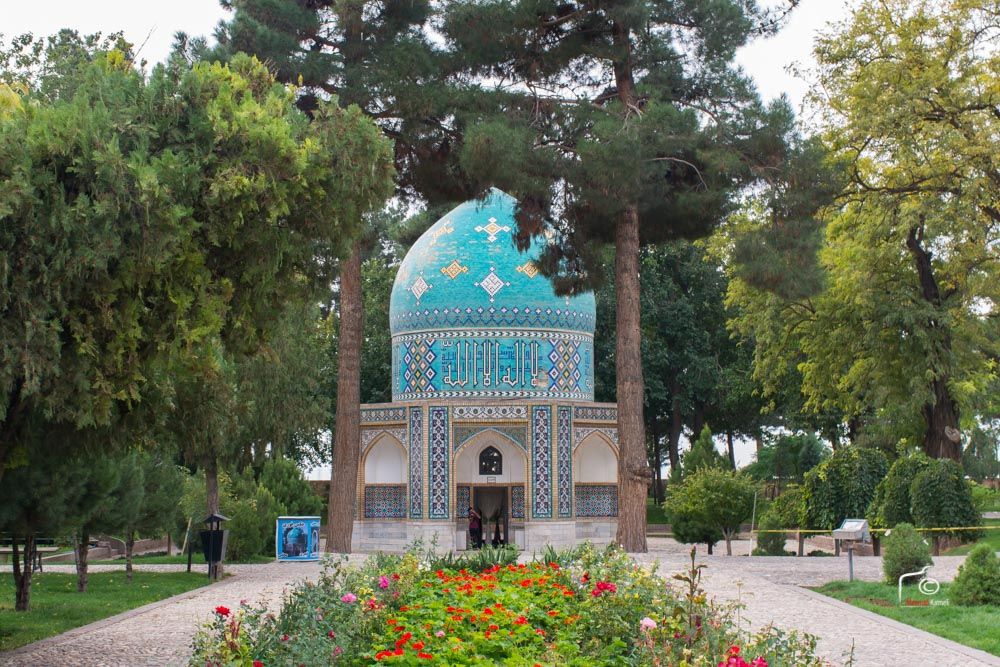
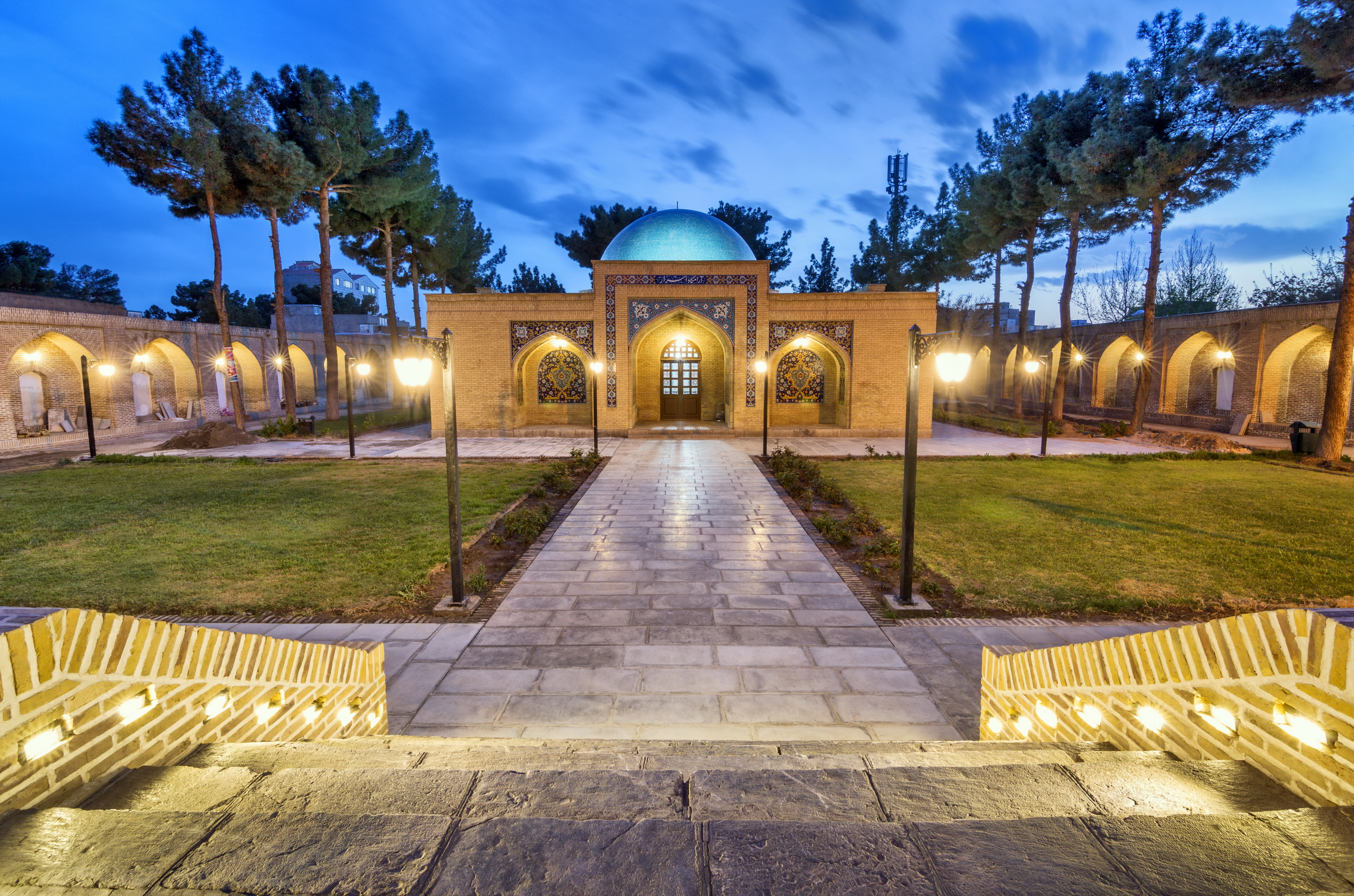
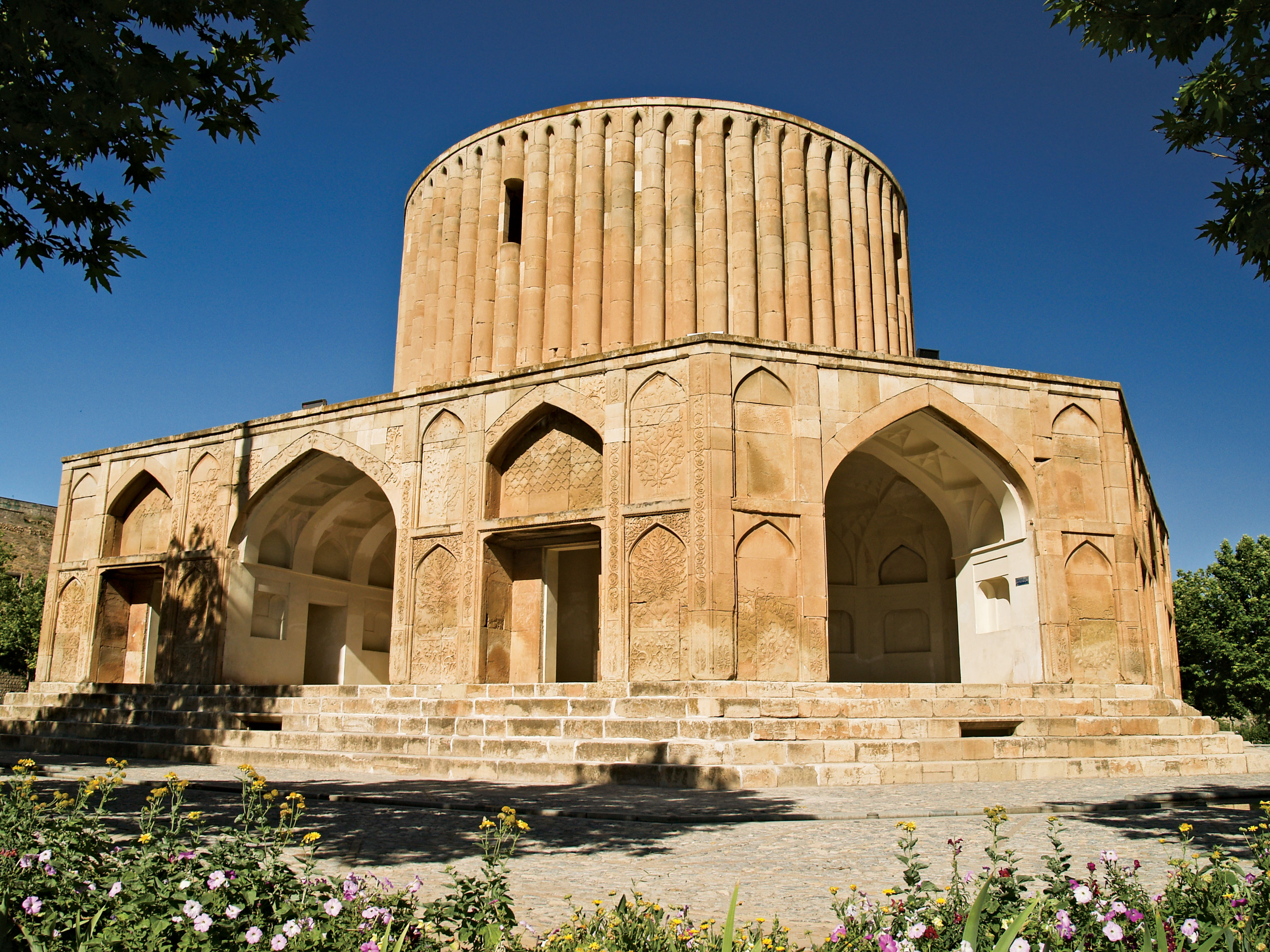
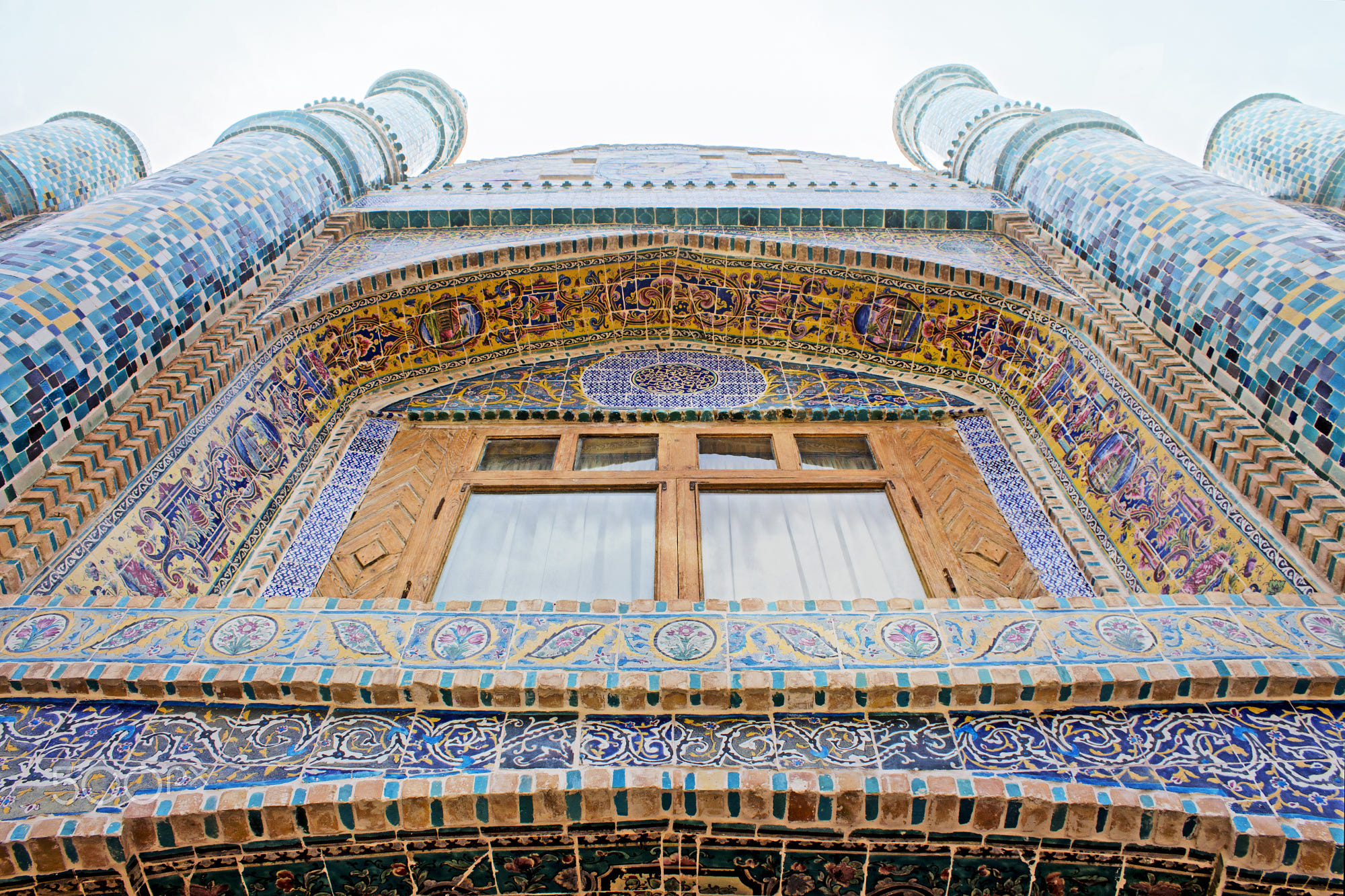
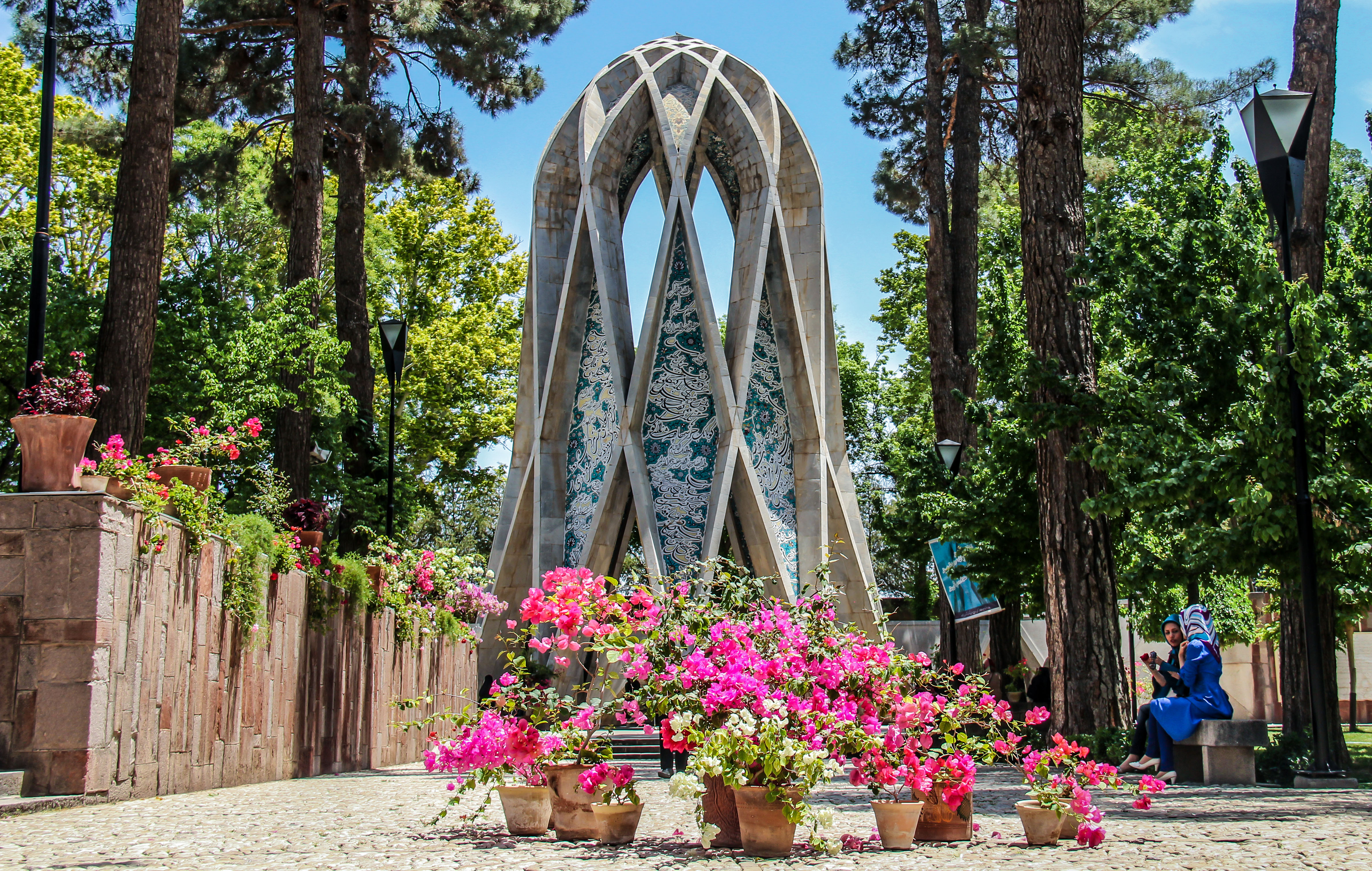
- From top to bottom and from left to right: Imam Reza shrine, Tomb of Ferdowsi, Mausoleum of Attar of Nishapur, Tomb of Hadi Sabzevari, Sun Palace, Mofakham's House of Mirrors, and Mausoleum of Omar Khayyám

- Location of Khorasan-e Razavi province within Iran
- Interactive map of Razavi Khorasan Province
- Coordinates: 35°47′N 58°42′E
- Country: Iran
- Region: Region 5
- Established: 2004
- Capital: Mashhad
- Counties: 34

Government
  - Governor-general: Gholam Hossein Mozaffari (Reformist)

Area
  - Total: 118,884 km^{2} (45,901 sq mi)
- Highest elevation (Mount Binalud): 3,211 m (10,535 ft)
- Lowest elevation (Sarakhs): 299 m (981 ft)

Population (2016)
  - Total: 6,434,501
  - Estimate (2020): 6,871,000
  - Rank: 2nd
  - Density: 54.1242/km^{2} (140.181/sq mi)
- Demonym: Khorasani (Persian: خراسانی)
- Time zone: UTC+03:30 (IRST)
- Area code: 051
- ISO 3166 code: IR-09
- Main language(s): Persian
- HDI (2017): 0.781 high · 19th
- Website: http://ostandari.khorasan.ir/

Razavi Khorasan province (Persian: استان خراسان رضوی) (Note: Also romanized as Ostân-e Xorâsân-e Razavi; also خراسان مرکزی, romanized as Xorâsân-e Markazi; English: Central Khorasan Province) is one of the 31 provinces of Iran, located in northeastern Iran. Its capital is the city of Mashhad, the second-most-populous city in Iran.

Razavi Khorasan is one of the three provinces created after the division of Khorasan province in 2004. In 2014, it was placed in Region 5 with Mashhad as the location of the region's secretariat. The adjective "Razavi" describes the province's association with Ali al-Rida (pronounced Reza in Persian), the eighth Imam of Twelver Shia Islam, who died in Tus in 818 and is buried in Mashhad.

== History ==
The Greater Khorasan has witnessed the rise and fall of many dynasties and governments in its territory throughout history. Various tribes of the Arabs, Turks, Kurds and Turkmens brought changes to the region time and time again.

Ancient geographers of Iran divided Iran ("Ērānshahr") into eight segments of which the most flourishing and largest was the territory of Greater Khorasan. Esfarayen, among other cities of the province, was one of the focal points for residence of the Aryan tribes after entering Iran.

The Parthian Empire was based near Merv in Khorasan for many years. During the Sassanid dynasty, the province was governed by a Spahbod (Lieutenant General) called "Padgošban" and four margraves, each commander of one of the four parts of the province.

Khorasan was divided into four parts during the Muslim conquest of Persia, each section being named after one of the four largest cities, Nishapur, Merv, Herat, and Balkh.

In the year 651, the army of the Rashidun Caliphate conquered Khorasan. The territory remained under the rule of the Abbasid Caliphate until 820, followed by the rule of the Iranian Tahirid dynasty until 873, and the Samanid dynasty in 900.

Khorasan was the largest province of Iran until it was divided into three provinces on 29 September 2004. The provinces approved by the parliament of Iran (on 18 May 2004) and the Council of Guardians (on 29 May 2004) were Khorasan-e Razavi, North Khorasan, and South Khorasan.

== Demographics ==
=== Population ===
At the time of the 2006 National Census, the province's population was 5,515,980 in 1,426,187 households. The following census in 2011 counted 5,994,402 people in 1,716,314 households. The 2016 census measured the population of the province as 6,434,501 in 1,938,703 households.

=== Ethnicity ===
The major ethnic group in this region are Persians, there are other sizeable communities such as Khorasani Kurds, Khorasani Turks, Turkmens and Khorasani Baloch.

=== Religion ===
According to the 2016 census, the Muslim population of Razavi Khorasan was 6,409,180, most of whom are followers of Shia Islam, with the shrine of the 8th Shi'ite Imam being located in Mashhad. A significant Sunni population also inhabit the province, forming the majority in cities such as Torbat-e-Jam and Taybad. Additionally, the 2016 census recorded that there were 7,159 Christians, 961 Zoroastrians and 135 Jews living in the province, with an additional 1,073 being recorded as following other faiths, and a further 15,993 not stating their religion.

=== Administrative divisions ===

The population history and structural changes of Razavi Khorasan province's administrative divisions over three consecutive censuses are shown in the following table.

Razavi Khorasan Province
Counties	2006	2011	2016
Bajestan (Note: Separated from Gonabad County after the 2006 census)	—	30,664	31,207
Bakharz (Note: Separated from Taybad County after the 2006 census)	—	53,582	54,615
Bardaskan	68,392	72,626	75,631
Chenaran	108,533	125,601	155,013
Dargaz	73,439	74,326	72,355
Davarzan (Note: Separated from Sabzevar County after the 2011 census)	—	—	21,911
Fariman	86,428	93,930	99,001
Firuzeh (Note: Separated from Nishapur County after the 2006 census; established as Takht-e Jolgeh County and renamed Firuzeh County)	—	42,739	37,539
Golbahar (Note: Separated from Chenaran County after the 2016 census)	—	—	—
Gonabad	106,158	80,783	88,753
Joghatai (Note: Separated from Sabzevar County after the 2006 census)	—	47,920	49,175
Joveyn	—	54,139	54,488
Kalat	39,560	38,232	36,237
Kashmar	146,536	157,149	168,664
Khaf	108,964	121,859	138,972
Khalilabad	44,993	49,111	51,701
Khoshab (Note: Separated from Sabzevar County after the 2006 census)	—	37,914	37,181
Kuhsorkh (Note: Separated from Kashmar County after the 2016 census)	—	—	—
Mahvelat	47,068	48,900	51,409
Mashhad	2,848,637	3,069,941	3,372,660
Miyan Jolgeh (Note: Separated from Nishapur County after the 2016 census)	—	—	—
Nishapur	441,184	433,105	451,780
Quchan	179,613	179,714	174,495
Roshtkhar	57,247	60,632	60,689
Sabzevar	429,187	319,893	306,310
Salehabad (Note: Separated from Torbat-e Jam County after the 2016 census)	—	—	—
Sarakhs	85,524	89,956	97,519
Sheshtamad (Note: Separated from Sabzevar County after the 2016 census)	—	—	—
Taybad	143,205	108,424	117,564
Torbat-e Heydarieh	261,917	210,390	224,626
Torbat-e Jam	239,395	262,712	267,671
Torqabeh and Shandiz (Note: Separated from Mashhad County after the 2006 census; established as Binalud County and renamed Torqabeh and Shandiz County)	—	58,483	69,640
Zaveh (Note: Separated from Torbat-e Heydarieh County after the 2006 census)	—	71,677	67,695
Zeberkhan (Note: Separated from Nishapur County after the 2016 census)	—	—	—
Total	5,515,980	5,994,402	6,434,501

=== Cities ===
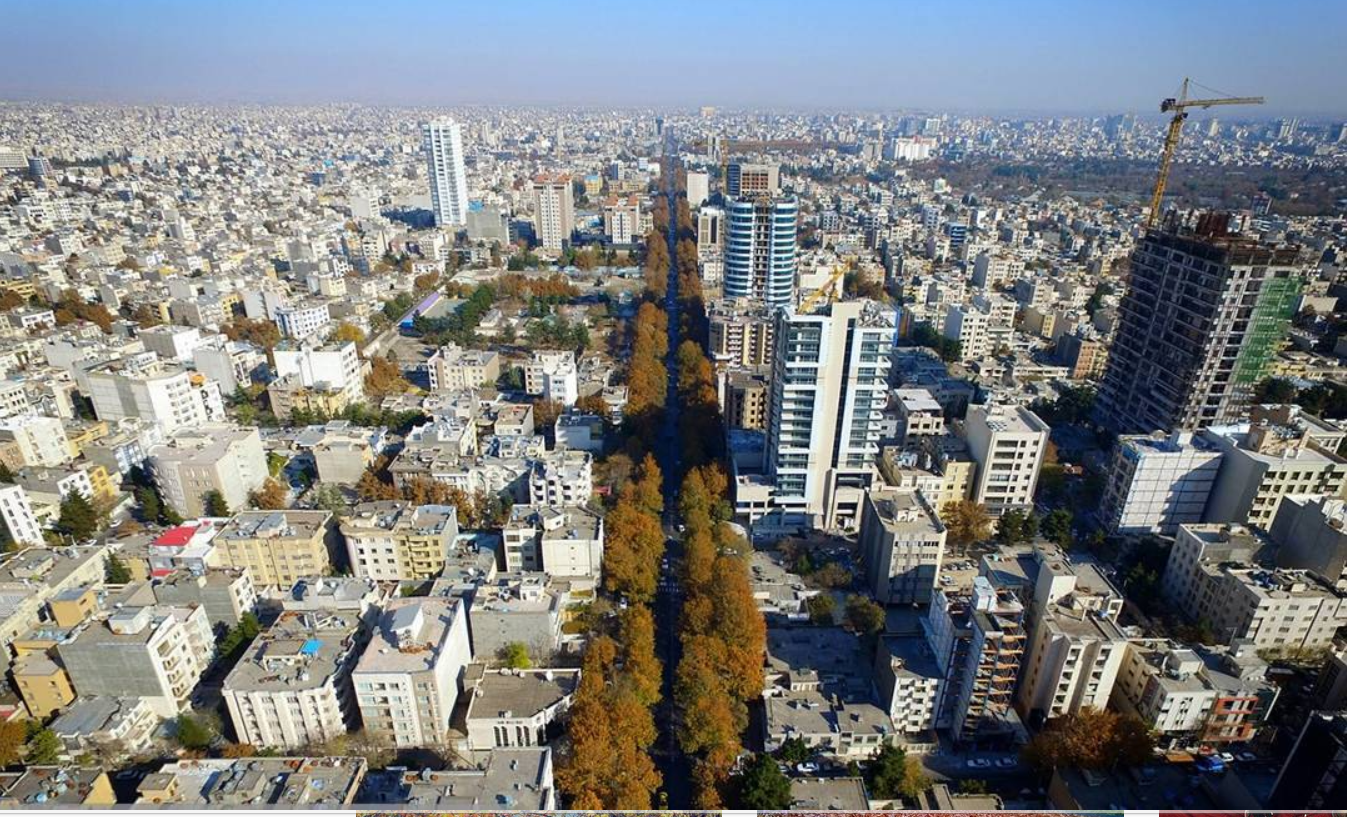
Mashhad

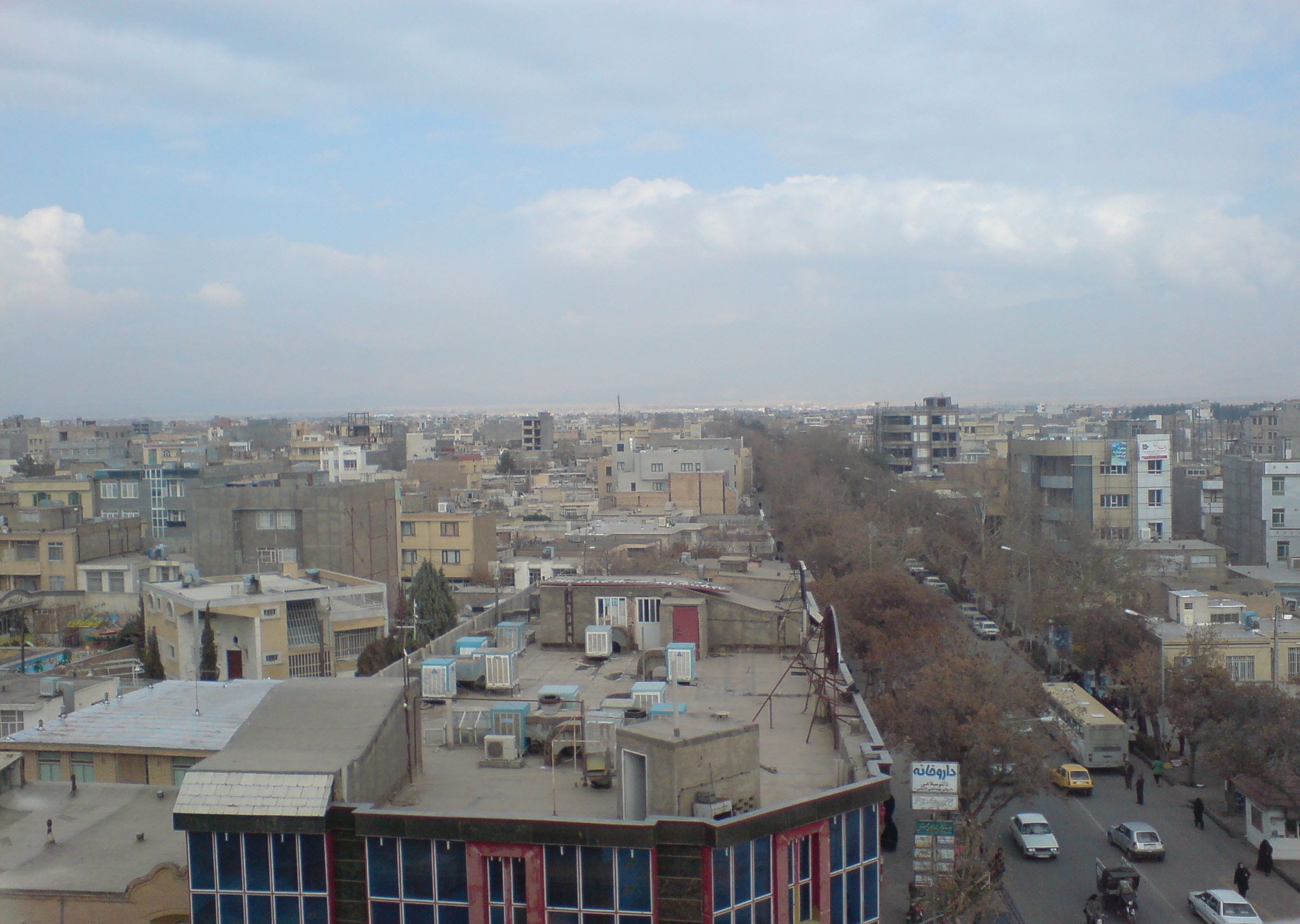
Nishapur

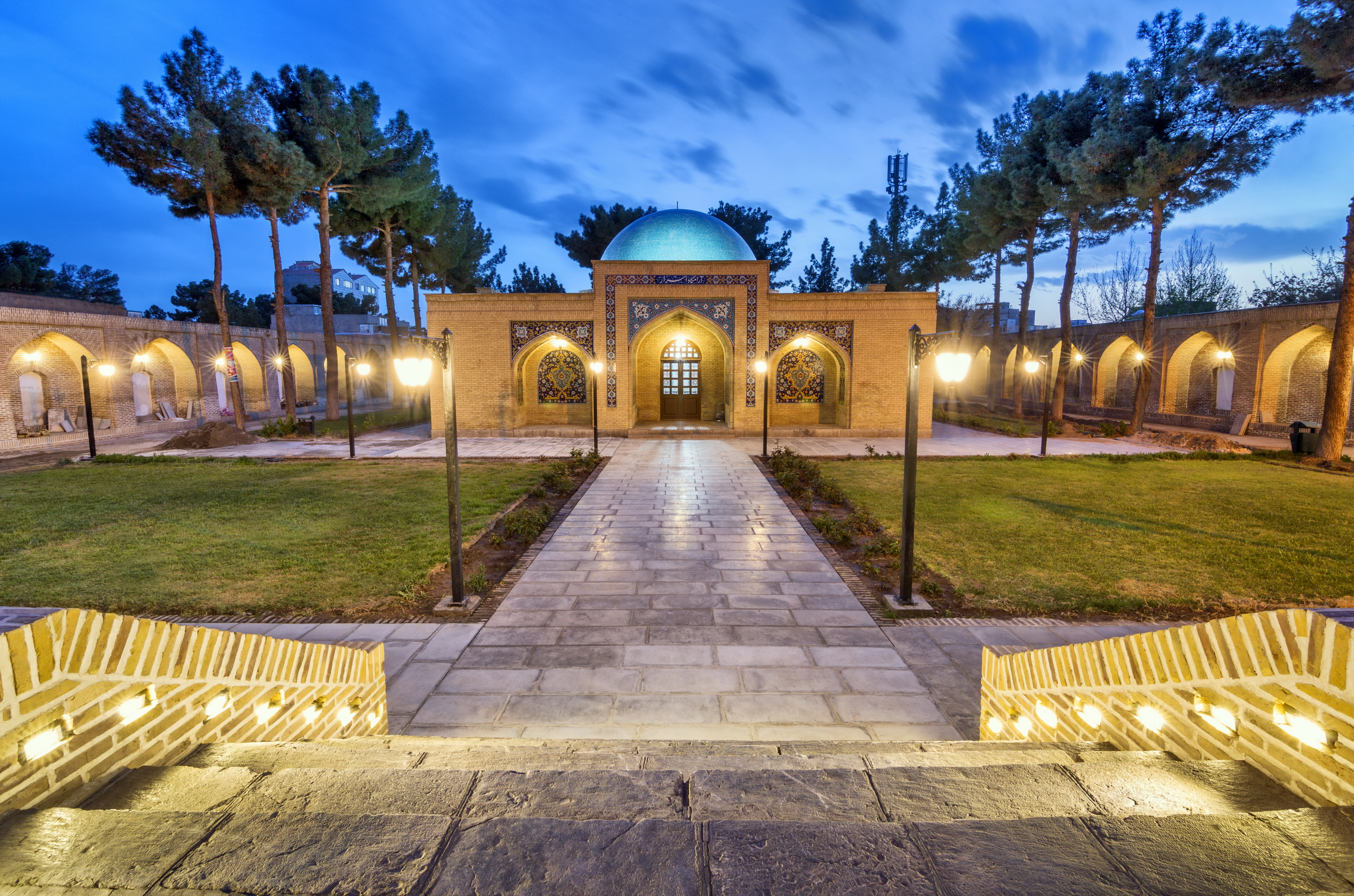
Sabzevar

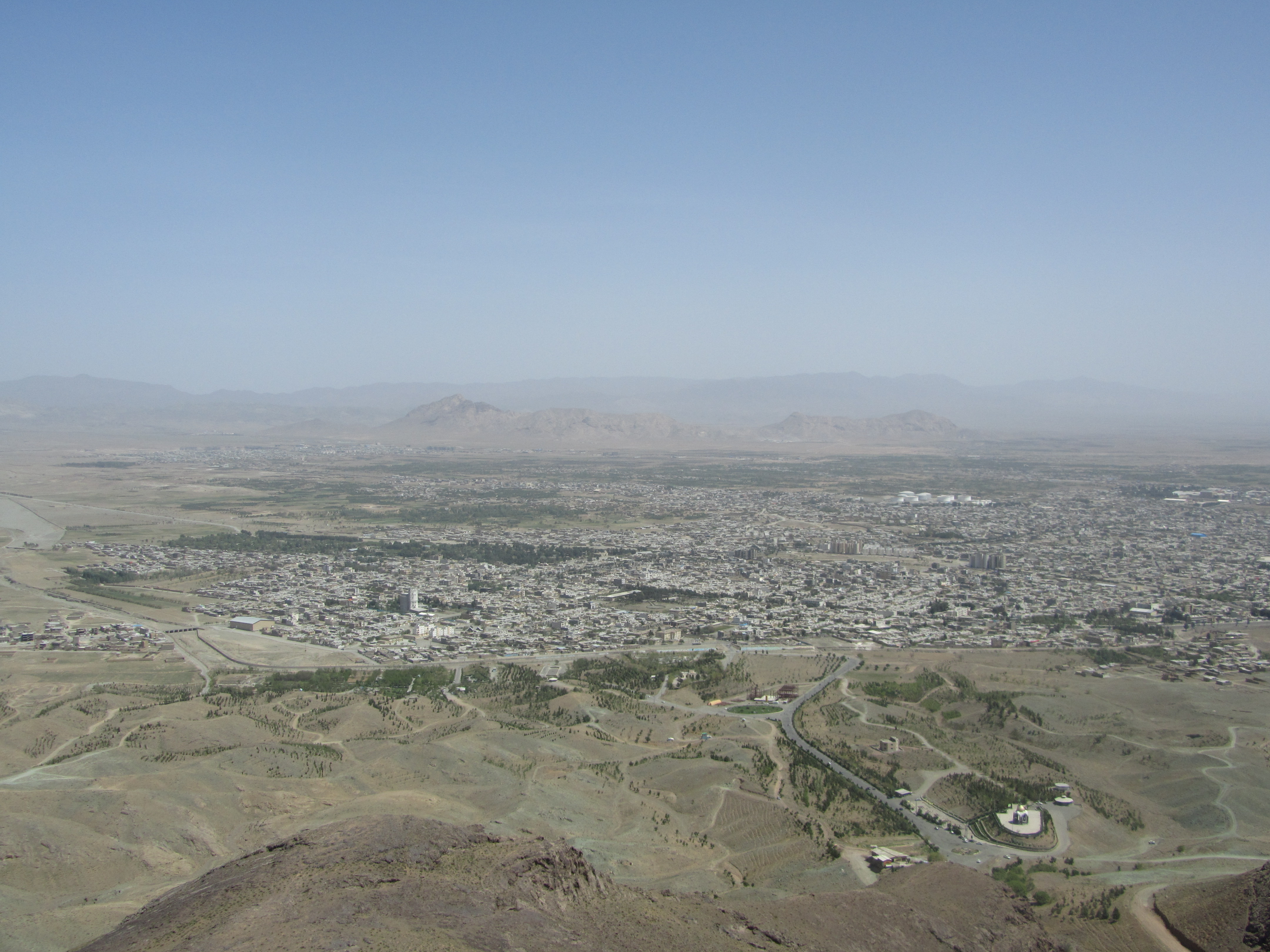
Torbat-e Heydarieh

According to the 2016 census, 4,700,924 people (over 72% of the population of Razavi Khorasan province) live in the following cities:

City	Population
Ahmadabad-e Sowlat	8,326
Anabad	6,186
Bajestan	11,741
Bajgiran	594
Bakharz	9,044
Bar	3,765
Bardaskan	28,233
Bayg	3,545
Bidokht	5,501
Chapeshlu	2,374
Chekneh	1,381
Chenaran	53,879
Dargaz	36,762
Darrud	5,717
Davarzan	2,744
Dowlatabad	9,329
Eshqabad	1,993
Farhadgerd	8,442
Fariman	39,515
Feyzabad	18,120
Firuzeh	5,884
Golbahar	36,877
Golmakan	8,373
Gonabad	40,773
Hemmatabad	1,274
Jangal	6,650
Joghatai	9,268
Kadkan	3,719
Kakhk	4,625
Kalat	7,687
Kariz	11,102
Kashmar	102,282
Khaf	33,189
Khalilabad	12,751
Kharv	13,535
Kondor	6,460
Lotfabad	1,865
Mashhad	2,987,323
Mashhad Rizeh	10,105
Mazdavand	1,241
Molkabad	2,056
Nashtifan	9,176
Nasrabad	7,460
Neqab	14,783
Nilshahr	7,371
Nishapur	264,375
Now Khandan	2,634
Qadamgah	3,010
Qalandarabad	4,880
Qasemabad	5,145
Quchan	101,604
Razaviyeh	8,850
Rivash	5,687
Robat-e Sang	1,551
Roshtkhar	7,514
Rud Ab	4,028
Sabzevar	243,700
Salami	7,555
Salehabad	8,625
Sangan	12,443
Sarakhs	42,179
Sefid Sang	6,129
Shadmehr	3,825
Shahrabad	2,083
Shahr-e Zow	3,745
Shandiz	13,987
Sheshtomad	3,108
Soltanabad	5,932
Taybad	56,562
Torbat-e Heydarieh	140,019
Torbat-e Jam	100,449
Torqabeh	20,998
Yunesi	3,426

The following sorted table lists the most populous cities in Razavi Khorasan according to 2016 Census results announced by Statistical Center of Iran. After Mashhad, Nishapur, Sabzevar, and Torbat-e Heydarieh are the most populous cities of the province.

Most Populous Urban Areas in Razavi Khorasan Province
Rank	City	County	Population
1	Mashhad	Mashhad	2,987,323
2	Nishapur	Nishapur	264,375
3	Sabzevar	Sabzevar	243,700
4	Torbat-e Heydarieh	Torbat-e Heydarieh	140,019
5	Kashmar	Kashmar	102,282
6	Quchan	Quchan	101,604
7	Torbat-e Jam	Torbat-e Jam	100,449
8	Taybad	Taybad	56,562
9	Chenaran	Chenaran	53,879
10	Sarakhs	Sarakhs	42,179

== Archaeological sites ==
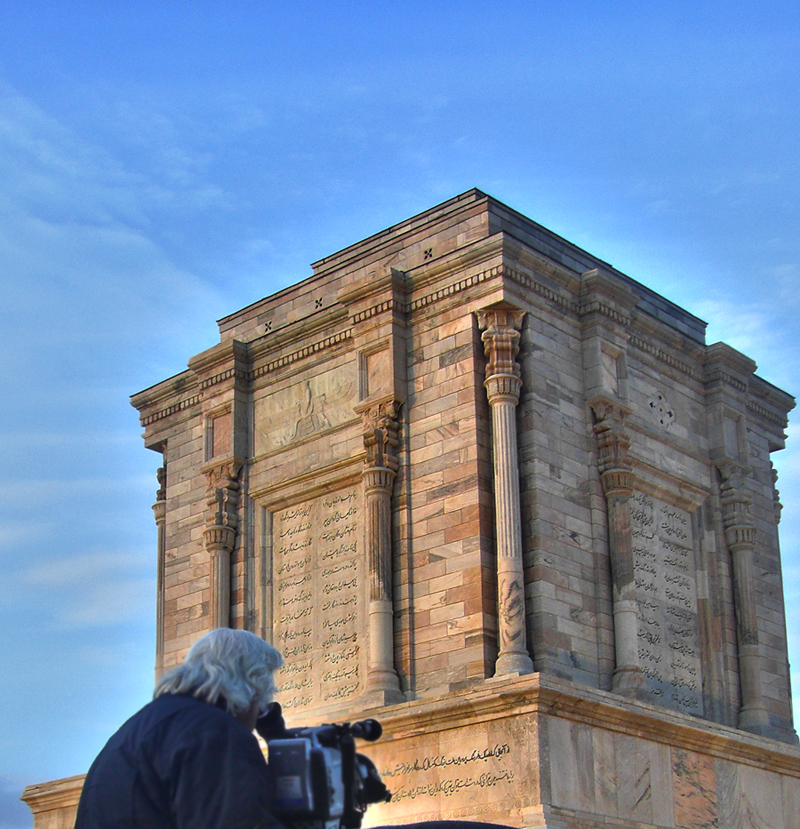
Tomb of Ferdowsi

The main archeological sites discovered in this province include:

=== Kohandezh hills ===
Excavations conducted by an American team between 1935 and 1940 in Nishapur discovered museum-worthy objects, which were shared with the government of the Shah. The Metropolitan Museum of Art's publications document its own Nishapur ceramics from those excavations. For half a century after 1945 the site of Nishapur was ransacked to feed the international market demand for early Islamic works of art. Nowadays, the Kohandezh hills reveal the remains from those excavations.

=== Shadiyakh ===
Shadiyakh was an important palace in old Nishapur up to the 7th century, and became more important and populated after that. The palace was completely ruined in the 13th century. It was the home of notables such as Farid al-Din Attar, whose tomb is found in Shadiyakh.

== Attractions ==
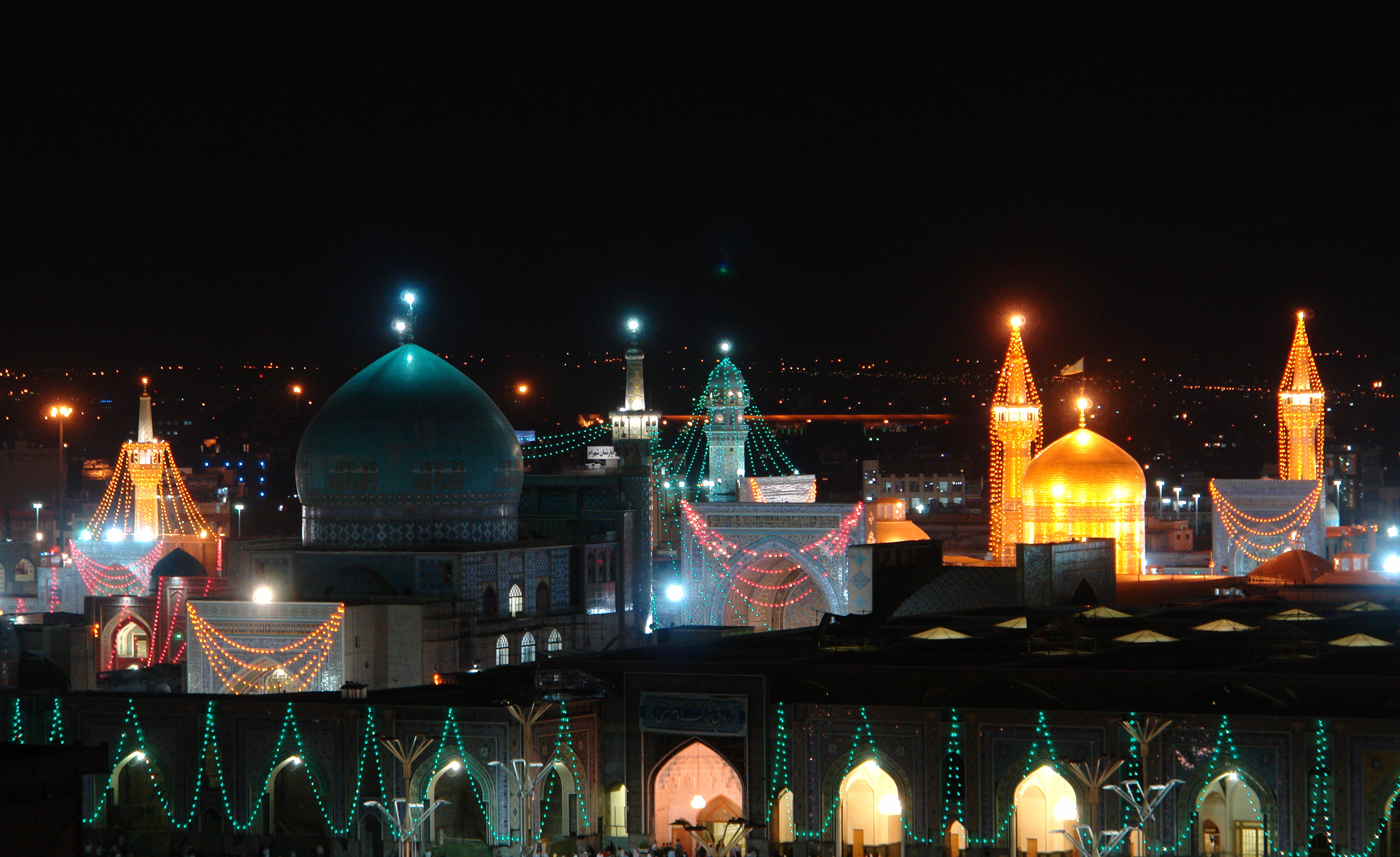
Imam Reza shrine in Mashhad

This province contains many historical and natural attractions, such as mineral water springs, small lakes, recreational areas, caves and protected regions, and various hiking areas.

Besides these, Khorasan encompasses numerous religious buildings and places of pilgrimage, including the shrine of Imam Reza, Goharshad mosque and many other mausoleums and Imamzadehs which attract visitors to this province.

The Cultural Heritage of Iran lists 1179 sites of historical and cultural significance in all three provinces of Khorasan.

Some of the popular attractions of Khorasan-e Razavi are:

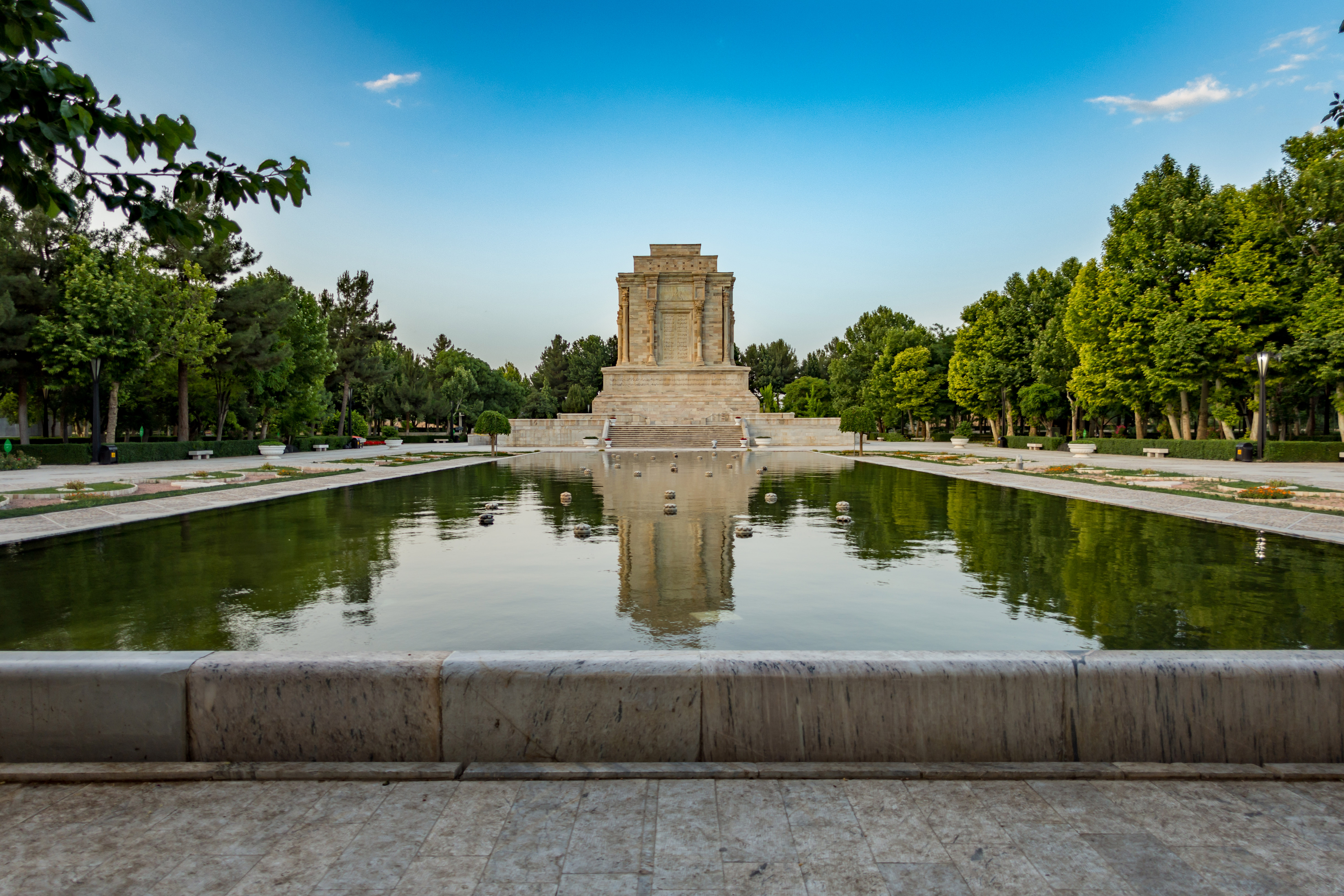
Tomb of Ferdowsi in Mashhad

=== Mashhad ===
- Imam Reza Shrine
- Goharshad Mosque
- Tomb of Nader Shah
- Tomb of Khajeh Rabie
- Tomb of Ferdowsi
- Haruniyeh Dome

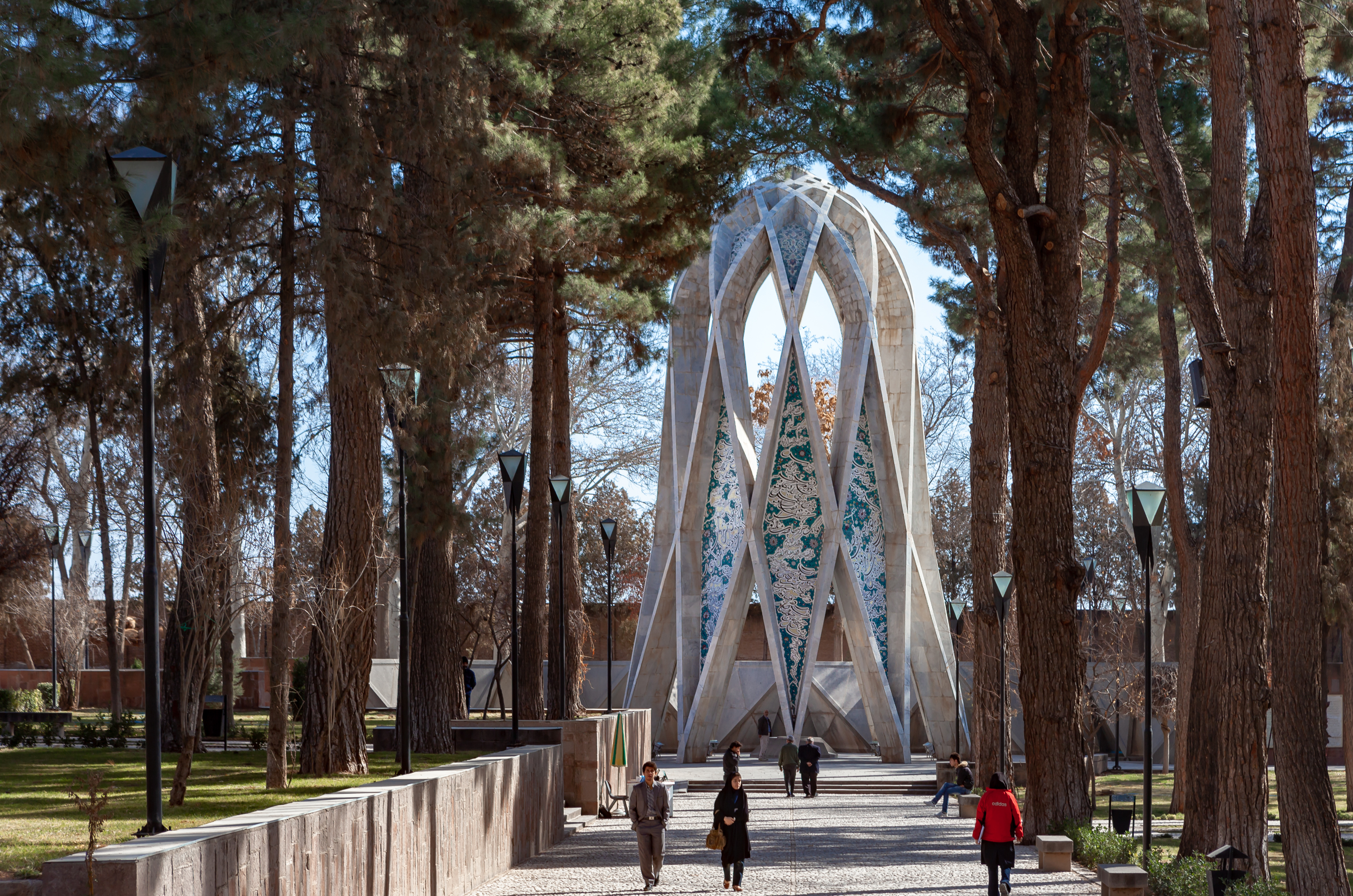
Mausoleum of Omar Khayyám in Nishapur

=== Nishapur ===
- Mausoleum of Attar of Nishapur
- Mausoleum of Omar Khayyám
- Tomb of Kamal-ol-molk
- Tomb of Heydar Yaghma
- Shadiyakh
- Jameh Mosque of Nishapur

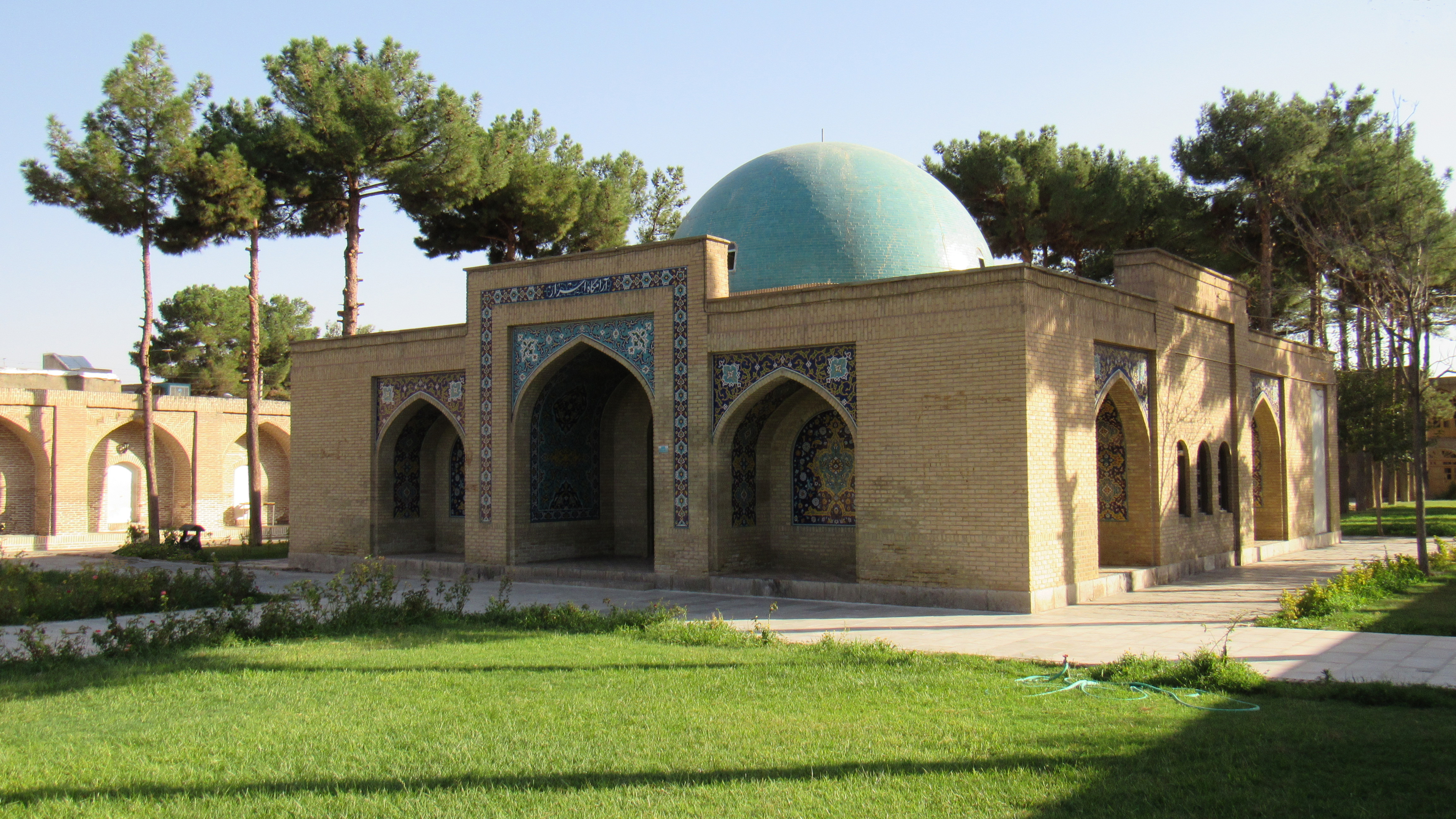
Tomb of Hadi Sabzevari in Sabzevar

=== Sabzevar ===
- Khosrogerd Minaret
- Pamenar Mosque, Sabzevar
- Jameh Mosque of Sabzevar
- Tomb of Hadi Sabzevari
- Tomb of Boghrat

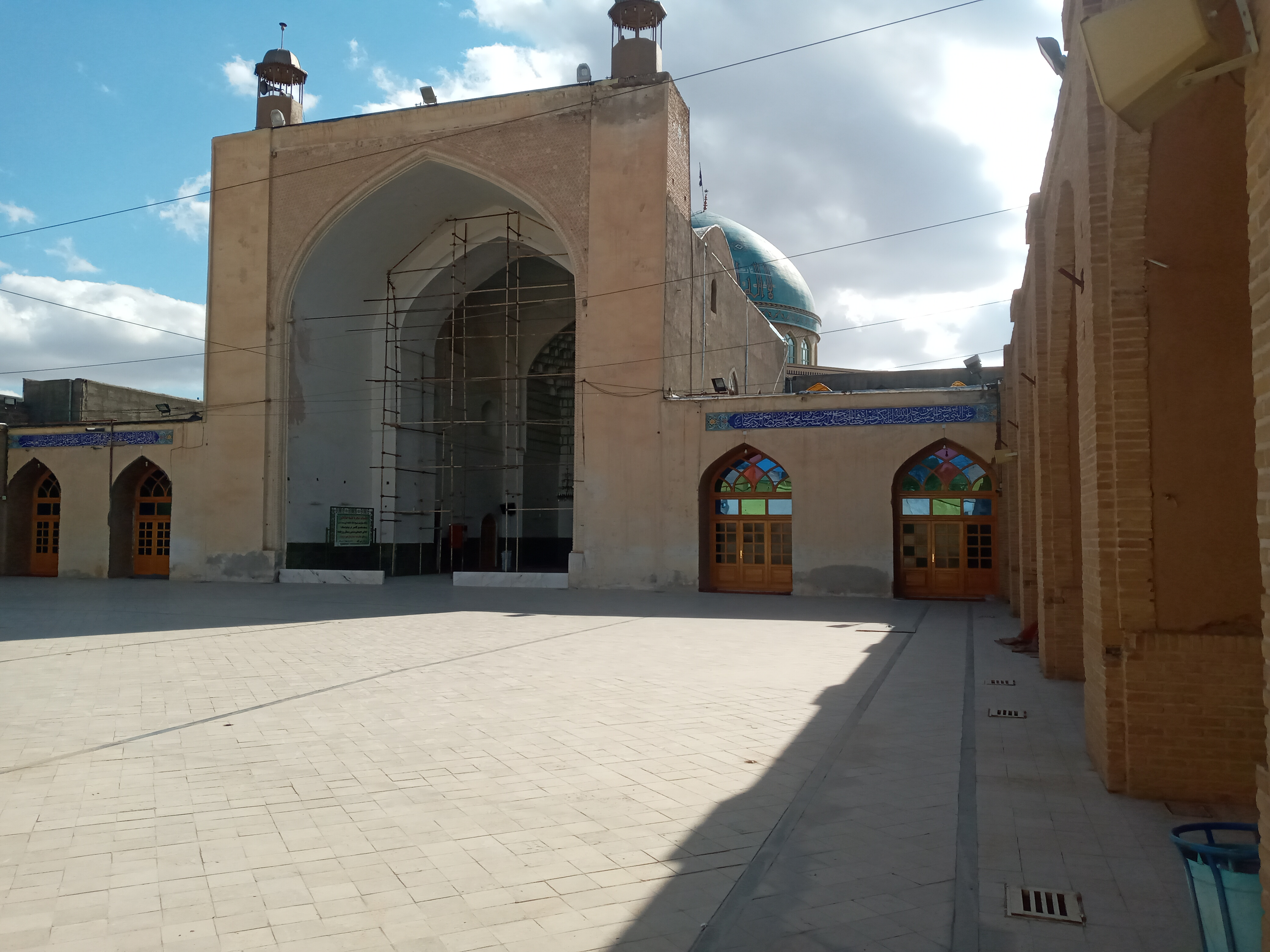
Jameh Mosque of Kashmar in Kashmar

Atashgah Castle in Kashmar

=== Kashmar ===
- Arg of Kashmar
- Tomb of Hassan Modarres
- Imamzadeh Seyed Morteza
- Imamzadeh Hamzeh, Kashmar
- Imamzadeh Mohammad
- Grave of Pir Quzhd
- Jameh Mosque of Kashmar
- Haj Soltan Religious School
- Haji Jalal Mosque
- Atashgah Manmade-Cave
- Atashgah Castle
- Kohneh Castle, Zendeh Jan
- Rig Castle
- Amin al-tojar Caravansarai
- Talaabad Watermill
- Yakhchāl of Kashmar

=== Khalilabad ===
- Jameh Mosque of Khalilabad
- Kondor castle
- Kondor Ab anbars

=== Torbat-e Jam ===
- Sheikh Ahmad-e Jami mausoleum complex

=== Gonabad ===
- Forud castle
- Qanats of Gonabad
- Kūh-Zibad

=== Sarakhs ===
- Ribat-i Sharaf
- Tomb of Baba Loghman

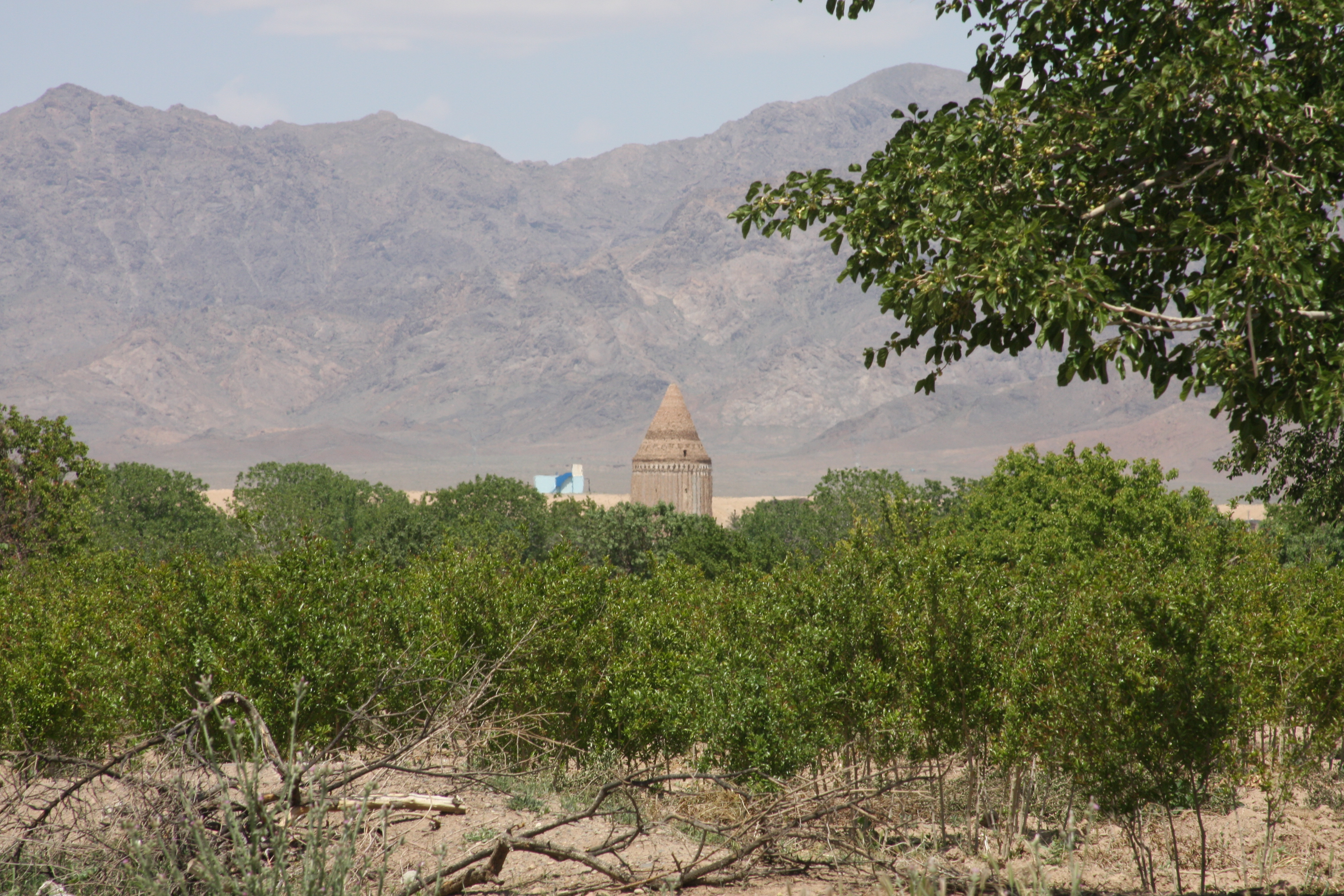
Aliabad Tower in Bardaskan

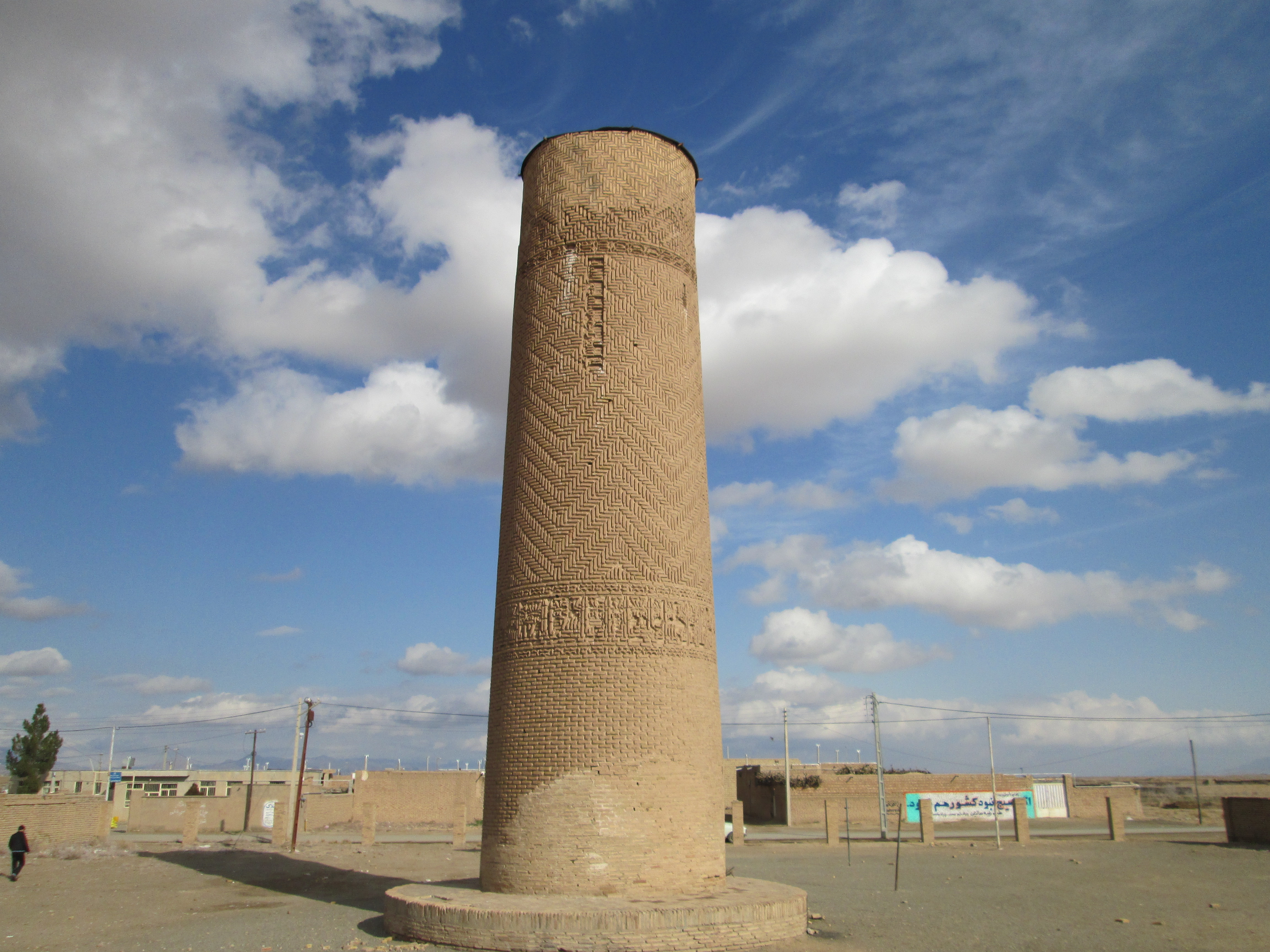
Firuzabad Tower in Bardaskan

=== Bardaskan ===
- Tomb of Abdolabad
- Aliabad Tower
- Firuzabad Tower
- Firuzabad area
- Seyyed Bagher Ab anbar
- Darone Cave
- Sir Cave
- Rahmanniyeh Castle
- Qal'eh Dokhtar, Khooshab
- Qal'eh Dokhtar, Doruneh

=== Bajestan ===
- Jameh Mosque of Marandiz

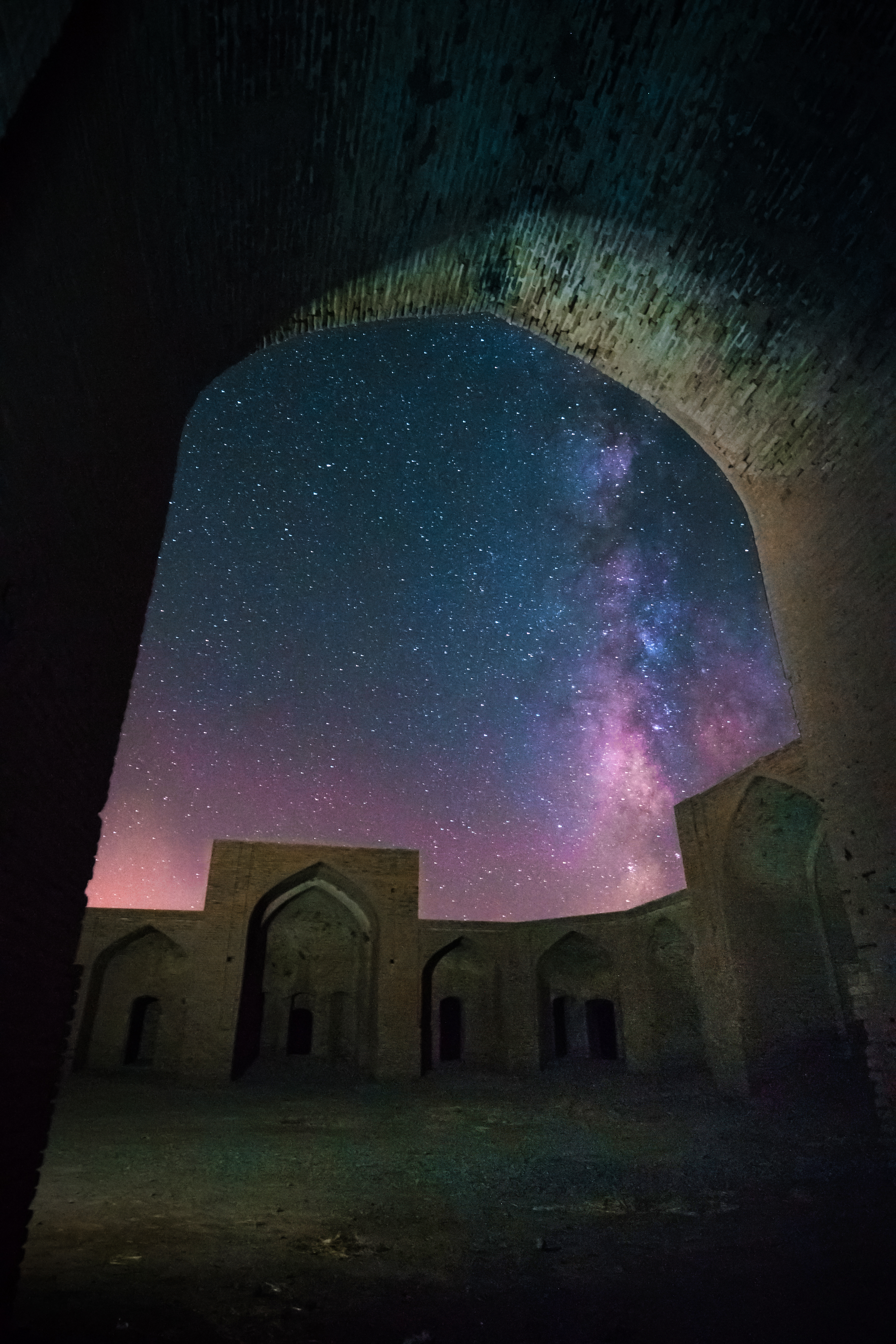
Abbasabad Complex Taybad in Taybad

=== Taybad ===
- Abbasabad Complex Taybad
- Karat Minaret

=== Rivash ===
- Qal'eh Dokhtar, Kuhsorkh
- Nameq Village
- Shahi Dam
- Gabar Hesar castle
- Baghdasht Peak
- Band-e Qara Bathhouse
- Natural Yakhchāl of Band-e Qara

== Colleges and universities ==
- Asrar Institute of Higher Education
- Bahar Institute of Higher Education
- Comprehensive University of Applied and Practical Sciences, Khorasan
- Ferdowsi University of Mashhad
- Gonabad University of Medical Sciences
- Hakim-e Sabzevari University of Sabzevar
- Imam Reza University
- Islamic Azad University of Bardaskan
- Islamic Azad University of Ghoochan
- Islamic Azad University of Gonabad
- Islamic Azad University of Mashhad
- Islamic Azad University of Neishabur
- Islamic Azad University of Sabzevar
- Islamic Azad University of Torbat e Jam
- Islamic Azad University of Torbat Heidariyeh
- Mashhad University of Medical Sciences
- Payame Noor University of Bardaskan
- Payame Noor University of Mashhad
- Sabzevar University of Medical Sciences
- Sadjad University of Technology
- Sport Sciences Research Institute of Iran

== Notable people ==
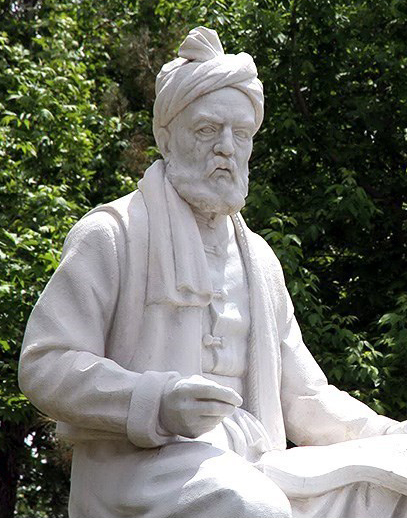
Ferdowsi

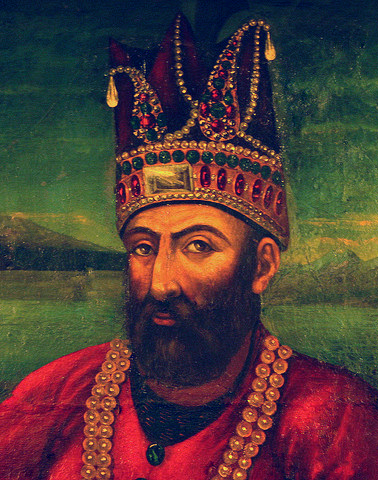
Nader Shah

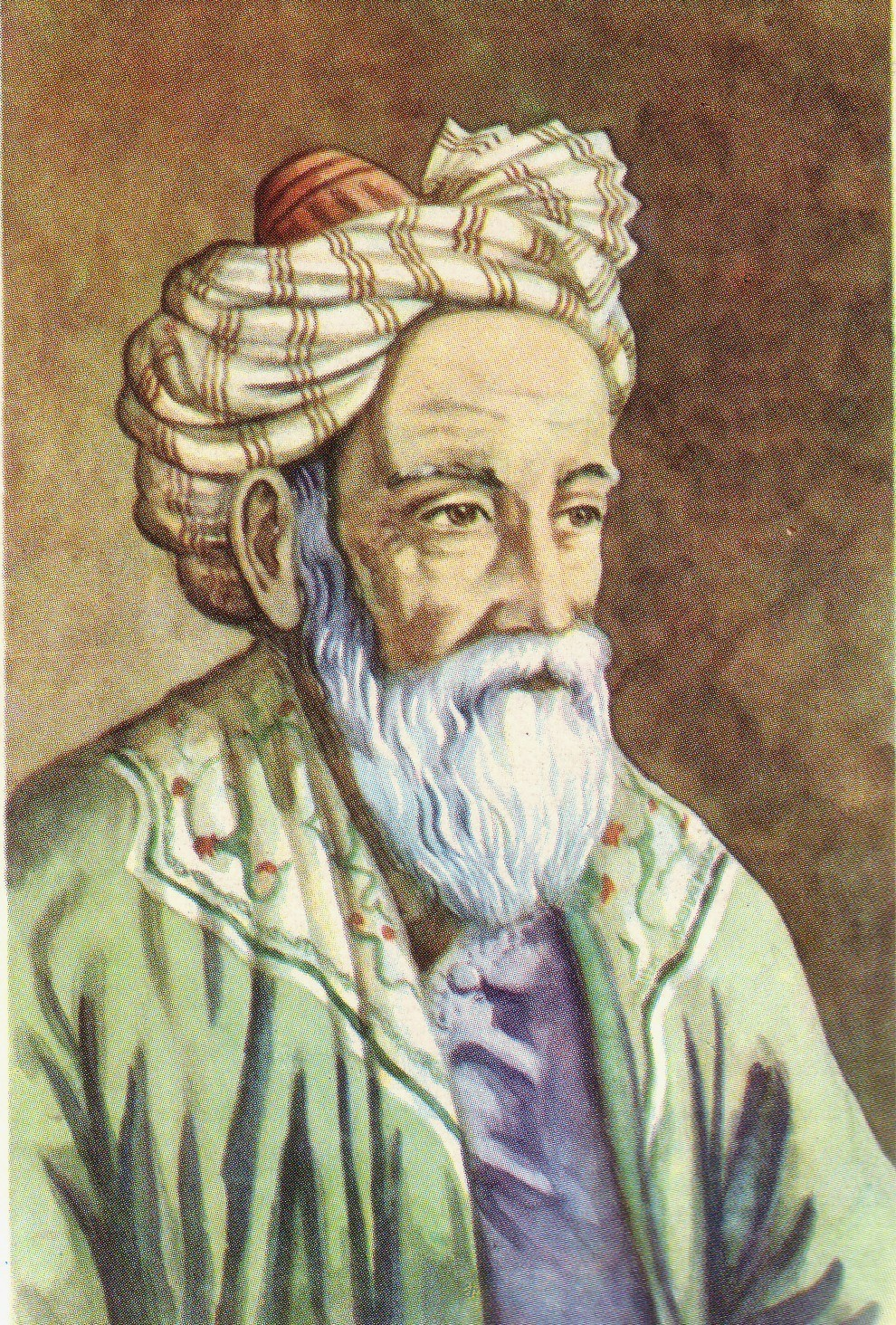
Omar Khayyam

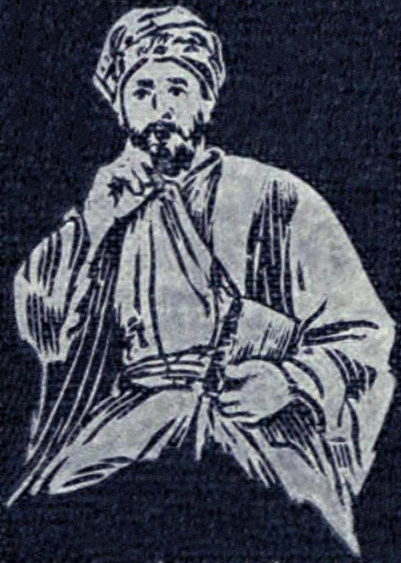
Al-Ghazali

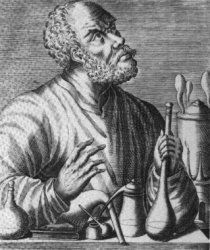
Jabir ibn Hayyan

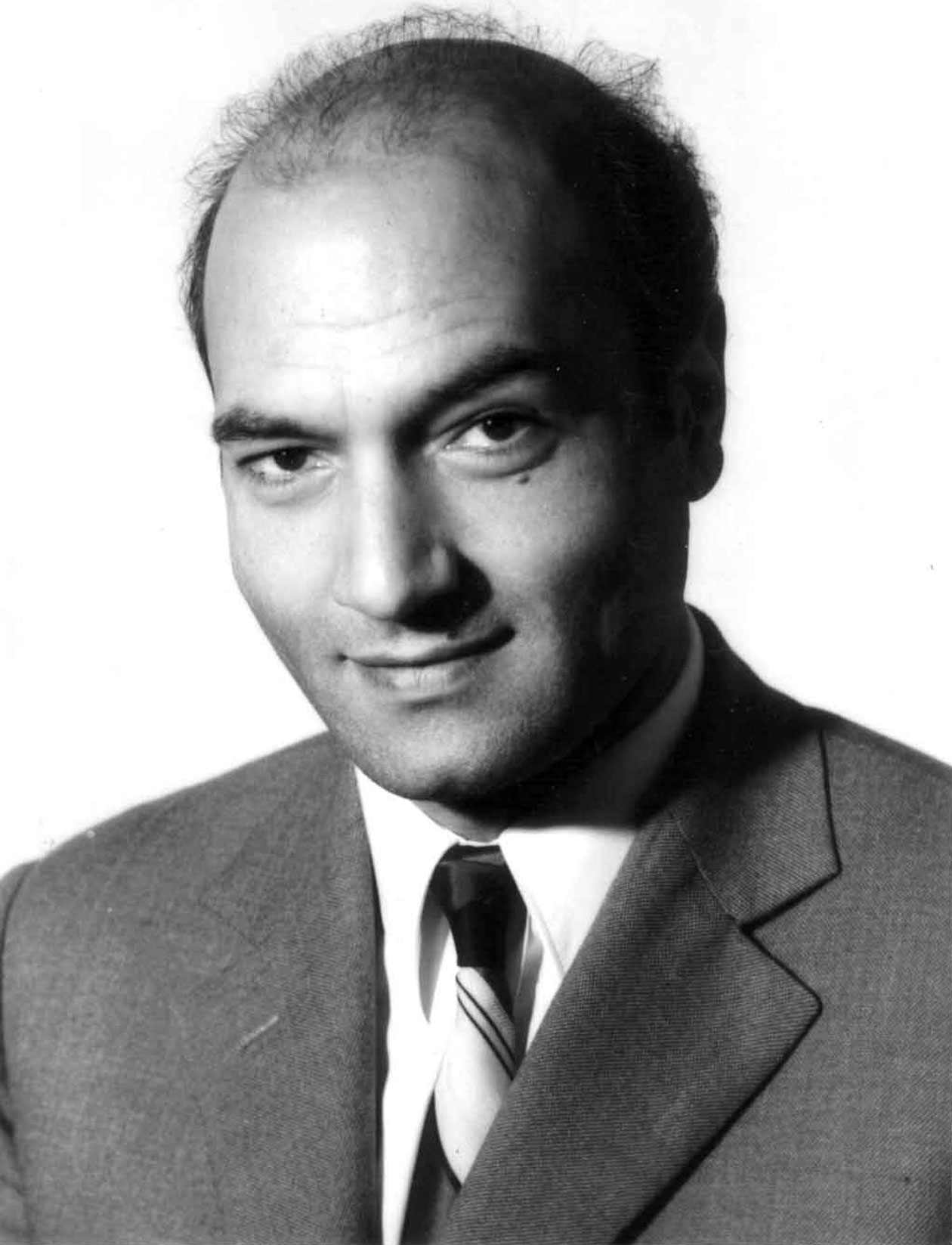
Ali Shariati

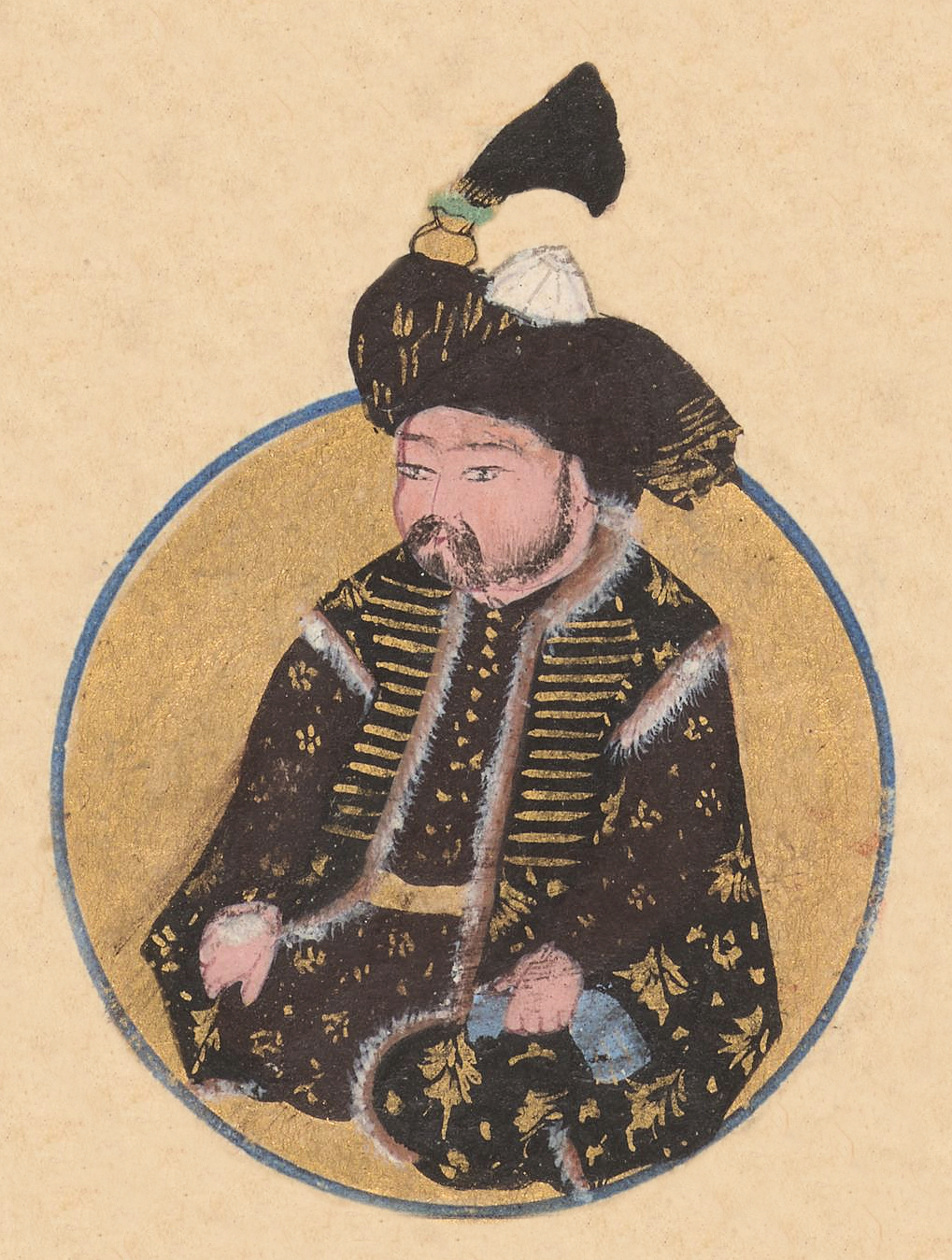
Abu Muslim

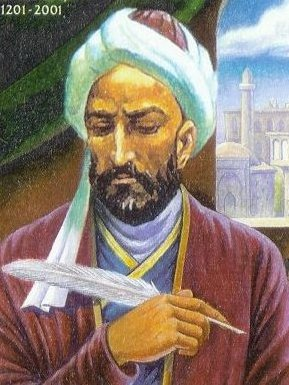
Nasir al-Din al-Tusi

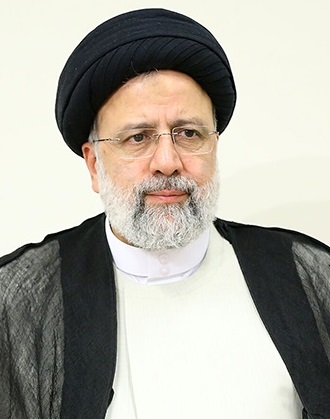
Ebrahim Raisi

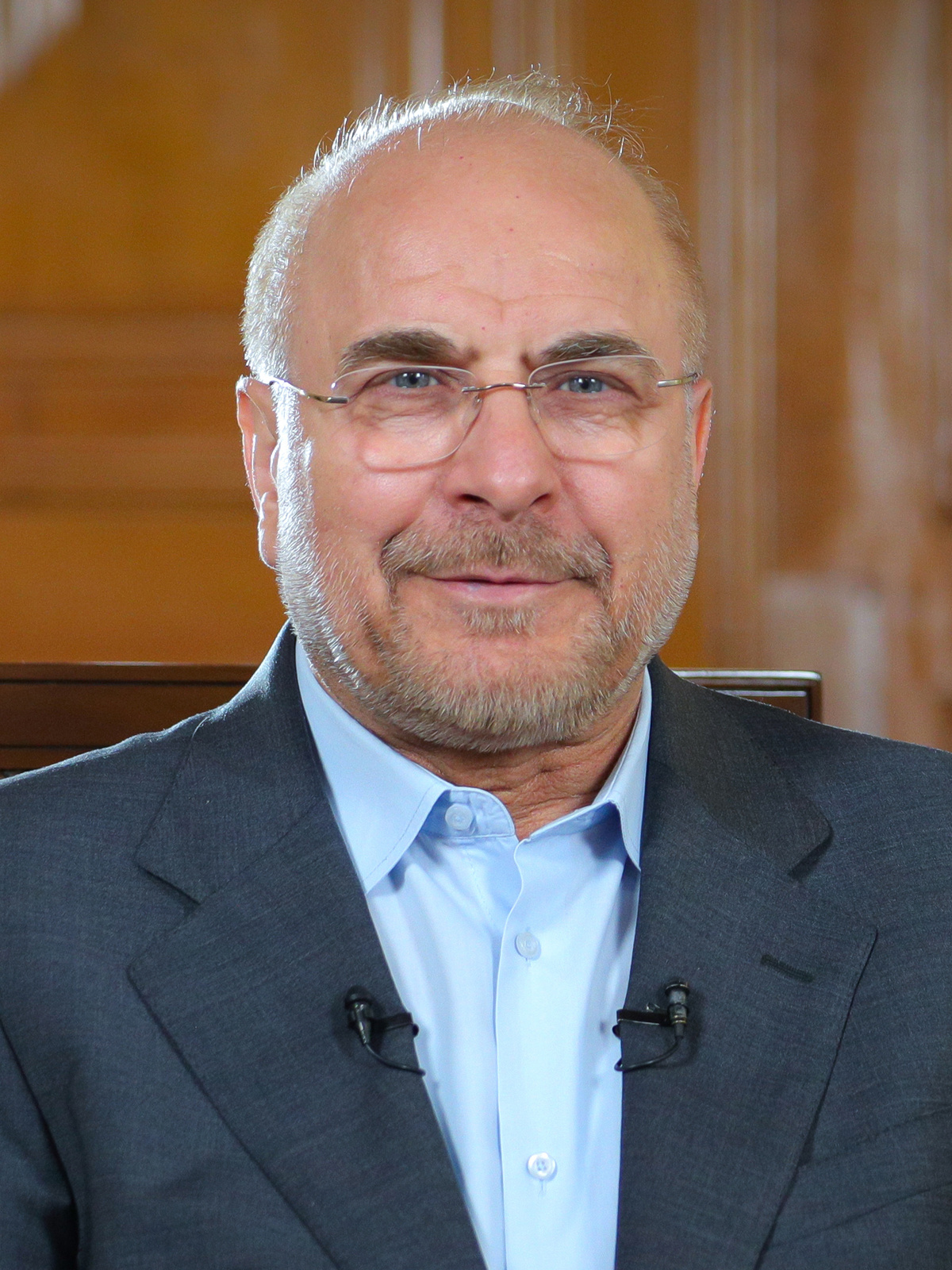
Mohammad Bagher Ghalibaf

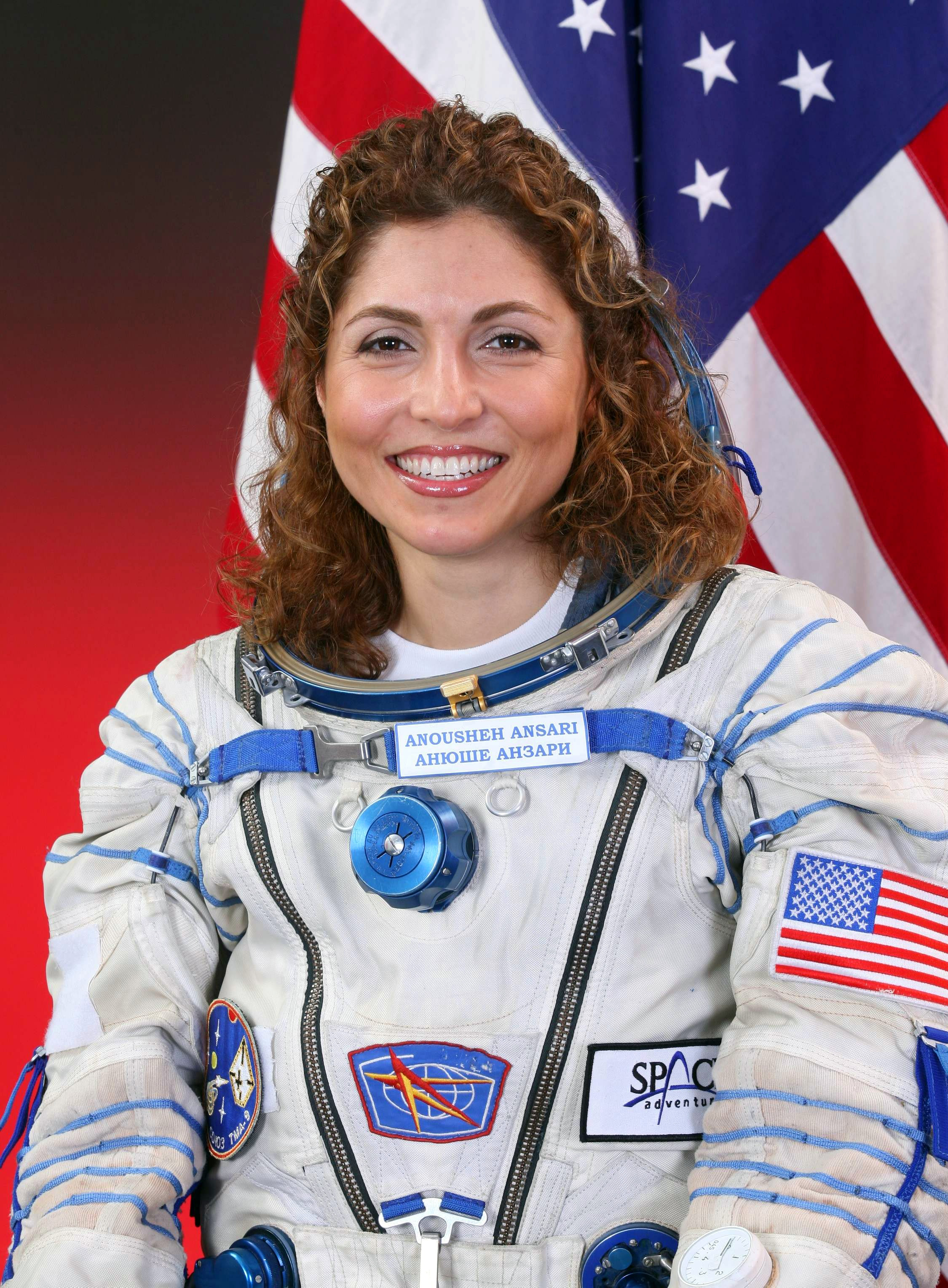
Anousheh Ansari

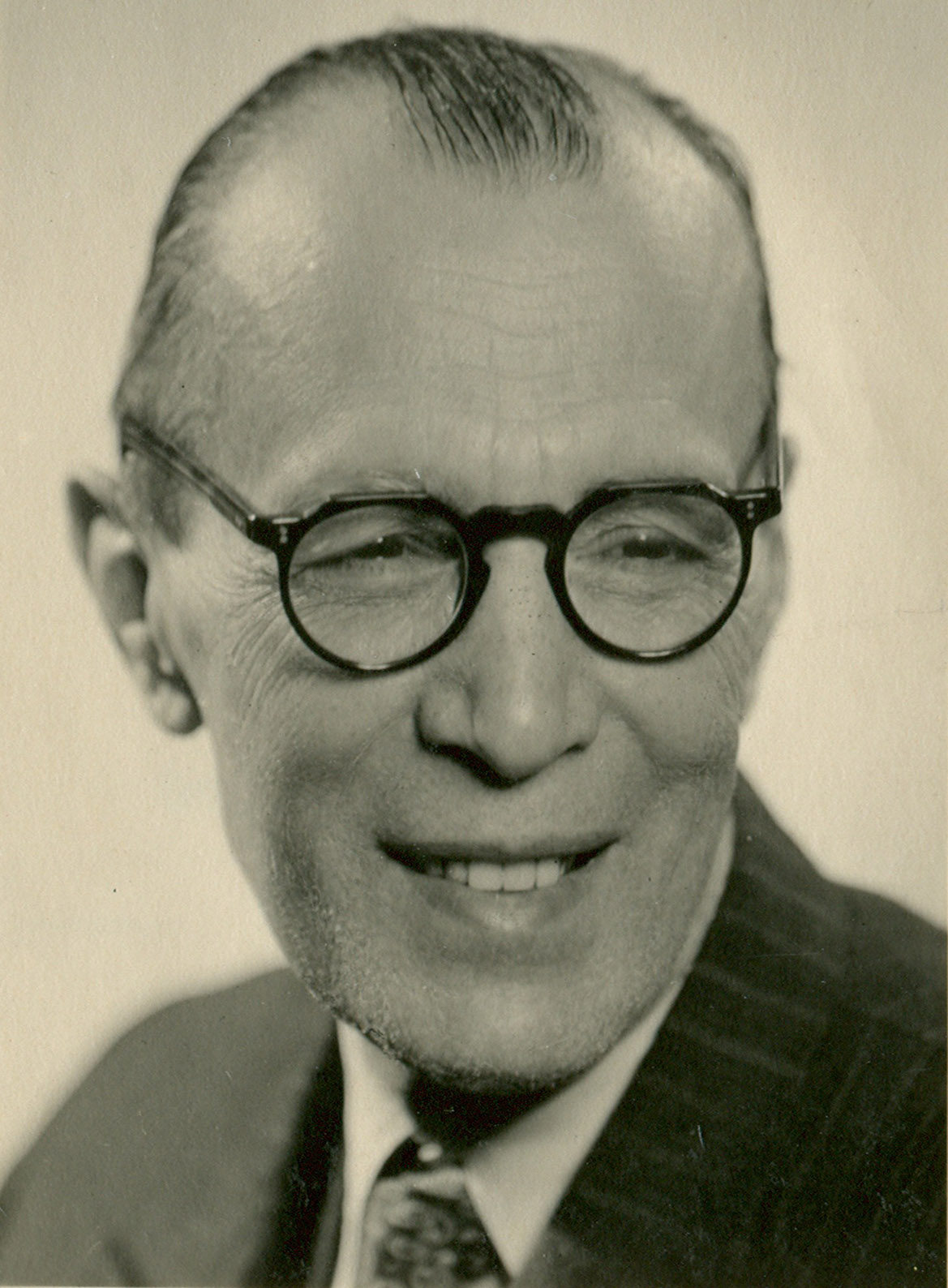
Mohammad-Taqi Bahar

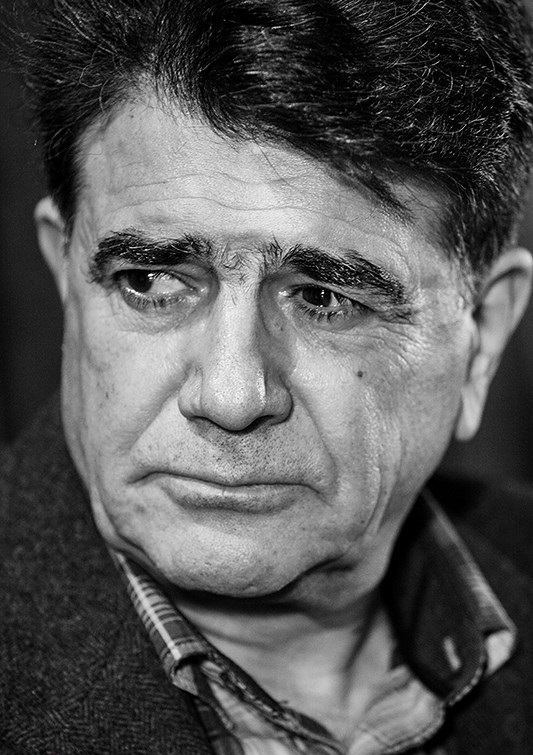
Mohammad-Reza Shajarian

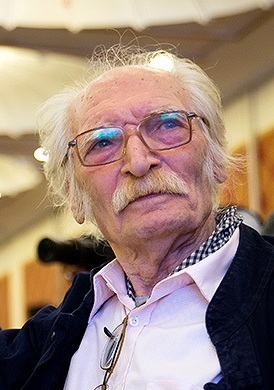
Mahmoud Dowlatabadi

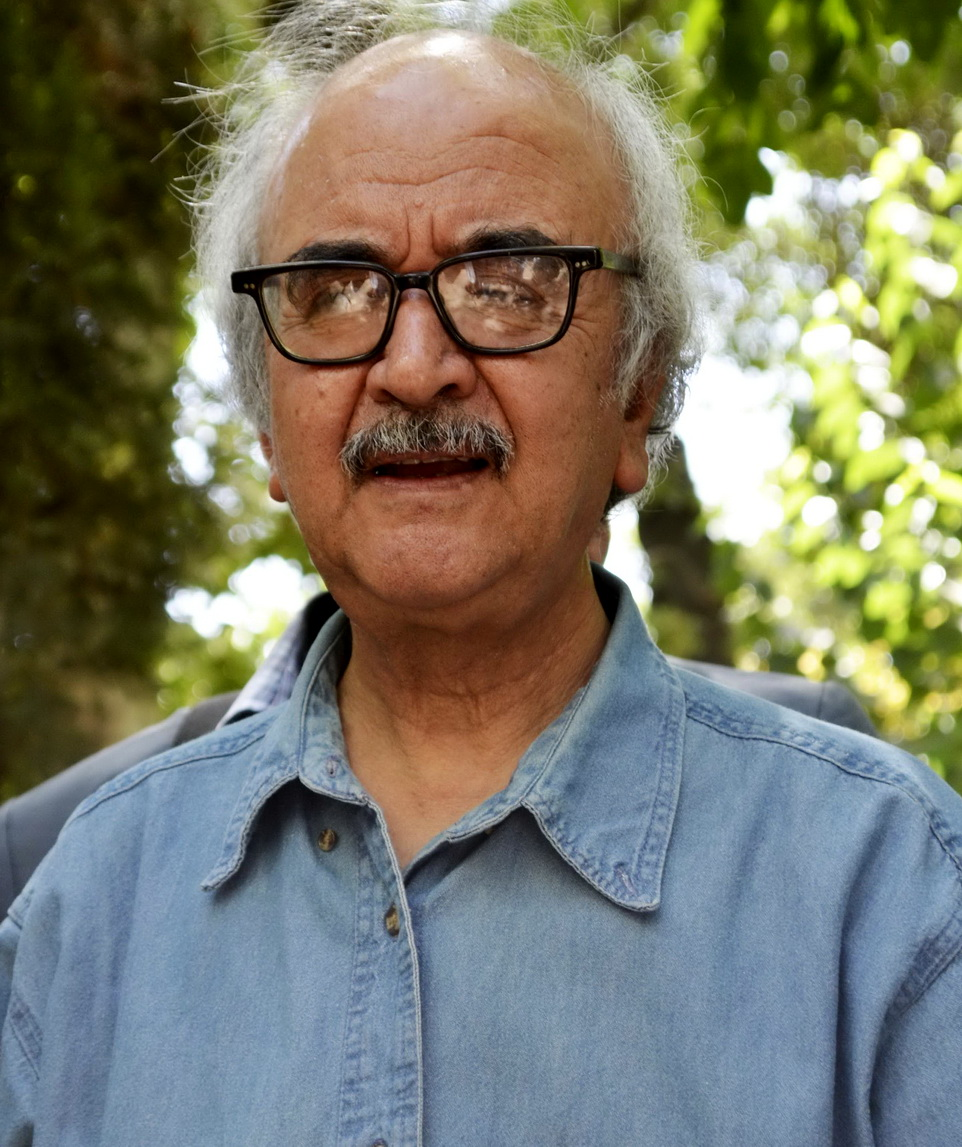
Mohammad-Reza Shafiei Kadkani

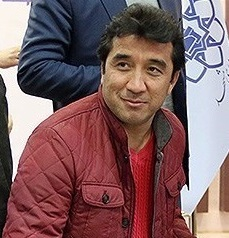
Khodadad Azizi

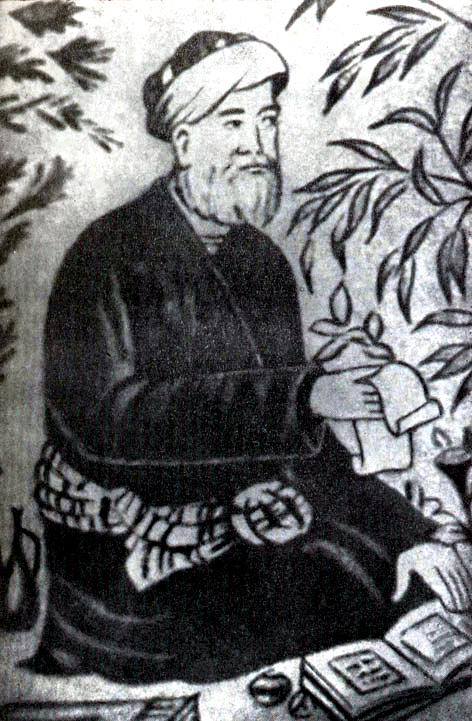
Jami

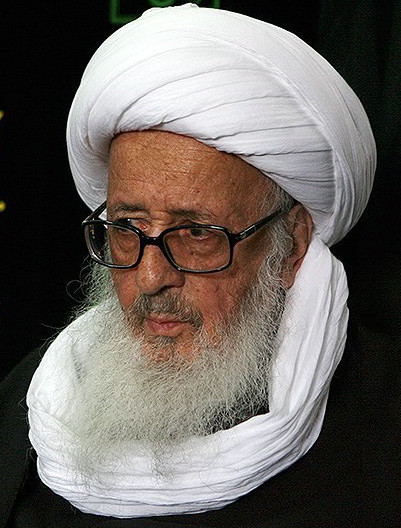
Hossein Wahid Khorasani

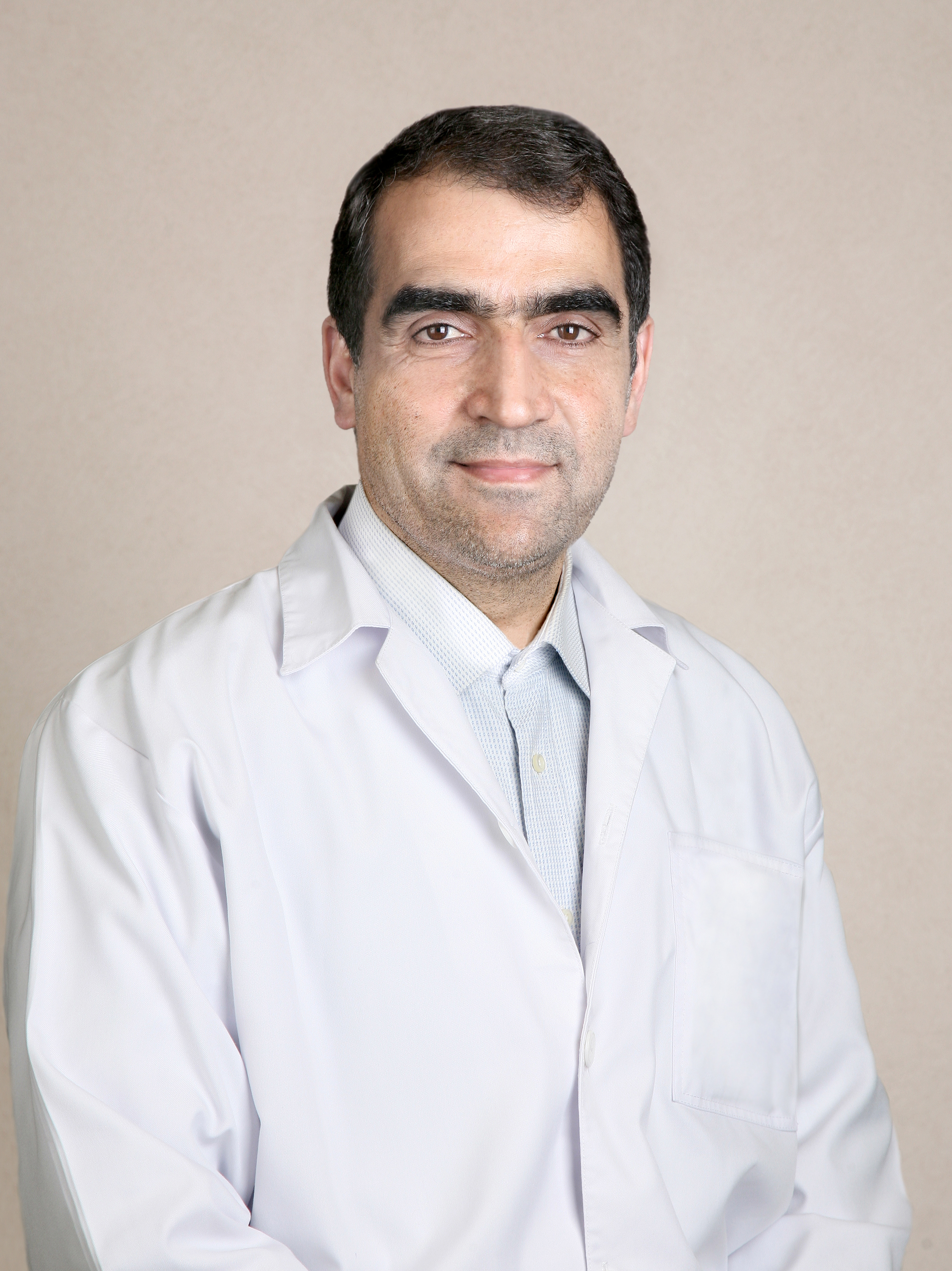
Hassan Ghazizadeh Hashemi

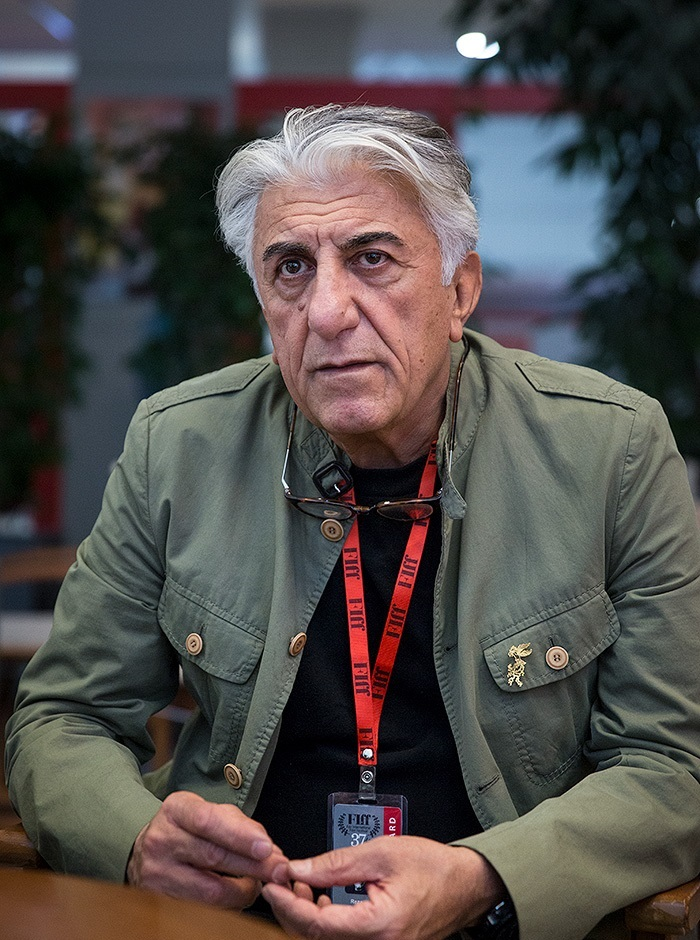
Reza Kianian

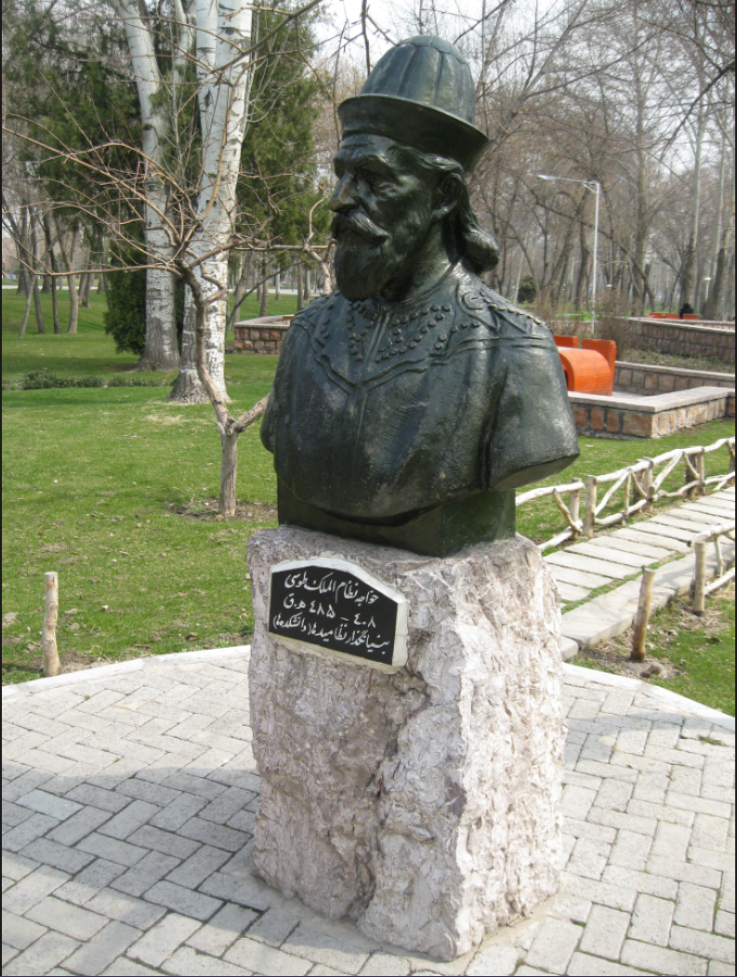
Nizam al-Mulk

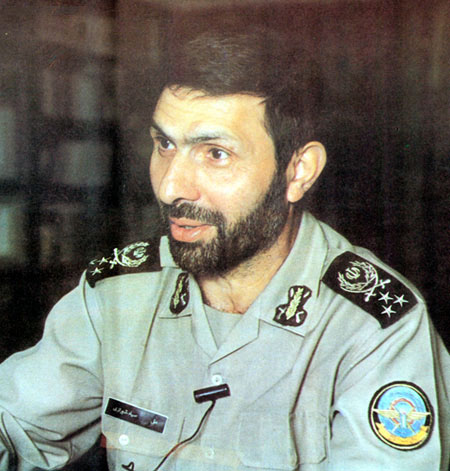
Ali Sayyad Shirazi

- Ferdowsi, Persian poet and the author of Shahnameh
- Nader Shah, Founder of the Afsharid dynasty of Iran and one of the most powerful rulers in Iranian history
- Omar Khayyam, Poet mathematics and astronomy
- Al-Ghazali, Muslim scholar and polymath
- Jabir ibn Hayyan, Alchemy and chemistry
- Ali Shariati, Writer and sociologist
- Ebrahim Raisi, 8th President of Iran
- Abu Muslim, General
- Nasir al-Din al-Tusi, Polymath, philosopher, physician and scientist
- Anvari, Poet and writer
- Anousheh Ansari, Iranian-American engineer and entrepreneur
- Mohammad-Reza Shajarian, Singer and master of Persian traditional music
- Homayoun Shajarian, Singer and master of Persian traditional music
- Mohammad Bagher Ghalibaf, Politician and military officer
- Mohammad-Taqi Bahar, Poet and politician
- Ahmad Ghazali, Sufi mystic and writer
- Mahmoud Dowlatabadi, Writer
- Mohammad-Reza Shafiei Kadkani, Writer, poet and literary critic
- Mehdi Akhavan-Sales, Modern poet
- Jami, Scholar and writer of mystical Sufi literature
- Khodadad Azizi, Football coach and player
- Mohsen Namjoo, Musician and singer
- Rasoul Khadem, Wrestler
- Amir Reza Khadem, Wrestler
- Sharaf al-Din al-Tusi, Mathematician and astronomer
- Shaykh Tusi, Muslim scholar and jurist
- Sheikh Ahmad-e Jami, Sufi writer, mystic and poet
- Ibn Yamin, Poet
- Morteza Motahhari, Twelver shia scholar and philosopher
- Nizam al-Mulk, scholar, jurist, political philosopher and minister
- Abu'l-Fadl Bayhaqi, Historian and author
- Asadi Tusi, Poet and writer
- Muslim ibn al-Hajjaj, Islamic scholar
- Saeed Jalili, Politician
- Haji Bektash Veli, Scholar, mystic, saint and philosophe
- Hadi Sabzavari, Philosopher and mystic theologian
- Badiozzaman Forouzanfar, Scholar and writer
- Daqiqi, Poet
- Hatefi, Poet
- Heydar Yaghma, Poet
- Sayf al-Din Bakharzi, Theologian
- Iran Teymourtash, Poet
- Mu'izzi, Poet
- Ibn Abi Sadiq, Physician
- Yusuf al-Juwayni, Theoretician and Islamic theologian
- Mohammad-Ali Abtahi, Politician and theologian
- Ali Sayad Shirazi, Military officer and commander
- Abd-al-Hussain Borunsi, Military officer
- Abu Mansur Muwaffaq, Physician
- Ibn Khuzayma, Physician
- Esmail Qaani, Brigadier general
- Eshaq Khan Qaraei-Torbati, Military commanders
- Abu al-Hassan al-Amiri, Philosopher
- Fasih Khwafi, Historian
- Hassan Taftian, Sprinter
- Al-Sulami, Muhaddith
- Abbas Salehi, Minister
- Hossein Wahid Khorasani, Author and shia marja
- Al-Fadl ibn Shadhan, Traditionist, jurist, and theologian
- Hassan Ghazizadeh Hashemi, Minister and full professor
- Muhammad Kazim Khurasani, Shia jurist and political
- Bi Bi Monajemeh Nishaburi, Mathematician and astronomer
- Alireza Faghani, International football referee
- Reza Kianian, Actor
- Hamed Behdad, Actor
- Fereydoun Jeyrani, Film director and screenwriter
- Abdolreza Kahani, Filmmaker
- Reza Attaran, Actor, director and screenwriter
- Reza Ghoochannejhad, Football player
- Navid Negahban, Actor
- Mitra Hajjar, Actress
- Hengameh Ghaziani, Actress
- Setareh Eskandari, Actress
- Sareh Bayat, Actress
- Rafi Pitts, Film director
- Mehran Ahmadi, Actor
- Saed Soheili, Actor
- Marshall Manesh, Actor
- Falamak Joneidi, Actress
- Rouzbeh Cheshmi, Football player
- Reza Enayati, Football coach and player
- Alireza Vahedi Nikbakht, Football coach and player
- Farhad Zarif, Volleyball player
- Abu al-Wafa' al-Buzjani, Mathematician and astronomer
- Heshmat Mohajerani, Football manager
- Mohammad Hassan Ganji, Meteorologist and academic
- Ahmad Alamolhoda, Shia Islamic cleric
- Gholamhossein Yousefi, Writer, translator
- Parviz Meshkatian, Musician, composer and researcher
- Sultan Ali Mashhadi, Calligrapher and master of nastaliq
- Fattahi Nishapuri, Poet and calligrapher
- Fatemeh Shams, Poet and literary scholar
- Naziri Nishapuri, Poet
- Fateme Ekhtesari, Poet and writer
- Keivan Saket, Composer
- Husayn Kashifi, Astronomer and author
- Mansour Nariman, Composer
- Yousef Kolahdouz, General
- Hassan Firouzabadi, General
- Kashef as-Saltaneh, Diplomat and constitutionalist
- Ata-Malik Juvayni, Historian
- Manouchehr Eghbal, Physician and royalist politician
- Abbas Vaez-Tabasi, Cleric and politician
- Mahmoud Kaveh, Military officer
- Ahmad ibn al-Tayyib al-Sarakhsi, Historian and philosopher
- Abdolreza Rahmani Fazli, Minister of Interior
- Mahmoud Khayami, Industrialist
- Al-Kunduri, Minister
- Mohammad Khazaee, Ambassador and Politician
- Hossein Sabet, Businessman
- Fakhreddin Hejazi, Politician
- Amir-Hossein Ghazizadeh Hashemi, Politician
- Behzad Nabavi, Politician
- Sowlat Mortazavi, Politician
- Sadegh Vaez-Zadeh, Politician
- Mohammad Dehghan, Politician
- Hamid-Reza Assefi, Ambassador
- Qutb ad-Dīn Haydar, Sufi
- Abu'l-Hasan Bayhaqi, Historian
- Mahmoud Shehabi Khorassani, Lawyer, philosopher and professor
- Hassan Rahimpour Azghadi, Writer and orator
- Iran Darroudi, Modern artist
- Mohammad Mokhtari, Writer
- Fariborz Sahba, Architect
- Abu Sahl Zawzani, Secretary
- Abd al-A'la al-Sabziwari, Shia marja
- Sayed Hassan Amin, Lawyer and philosopher
- Mohammad Mahdi Faghihi, Newspaper publisher
- Younes Shokrkhah, Journalist and academician
- Ali Baghbanbashi, Long-distance runner
- Hadi Khorsandi, Poet and satiris
- Porya Yali, Volleyball player
- Sepi Shyne, Attorney
- Mordechai Zar, Politician
- Mohsen Aminzadeh, Politician
- Alireza Kazemi, Minister
- Morteza Bakhtiari, Politician
- Golriz Ghahraman, Politician and lawyer
- Mohammad-Reza Rahchamani, Politician
- Dubfire, Musician
- Mohsen Ebrahimzadeh, Musician
- Mohammad Salimi, Minister and Commander
- Alireza Afshar, Military officer
- Hossein Badamaki, Football player
- Reza Haghighi, Football player
- Siavash Yazdani, Football player
- Hamed Afagh, Basketball player
- Rouzbeh Arghavan, Basketball player
- Masoud Haji Akhondzadeh, Judo player
- Mitra Hejazipour, Chess player
- Aria Nasimi Shad, Swimmer
- Majid Khodaei, Wrestler
- Teymour Ghiasi, Athletics
- Kourosh Khani, Racing driver
- Hadi Rezaei, Volleyball coach
- Hossein Tayyebi, Futsal player
- Ahmad Marvi, Shia cleric
- Ali Divandari, Cartoonist
- Amir Hosseini, Volleyball player
- Ehsan Jami, Politician
- Noureddin Zarrinkelk, Animator
- Ghazaleh Alizadeh, Poet
- Mohammad Daneshvar, Cyclist
- Ghamar Ariyan, Author
- Aqa Najafi Quchani, Islamic scholar
- Haj Qorban Soleimani, Musician
- Mohammed Kadhim al-Modarresi, Shia cleric
- Hasanali Morvarid, Shia cleric

== Gallery ==
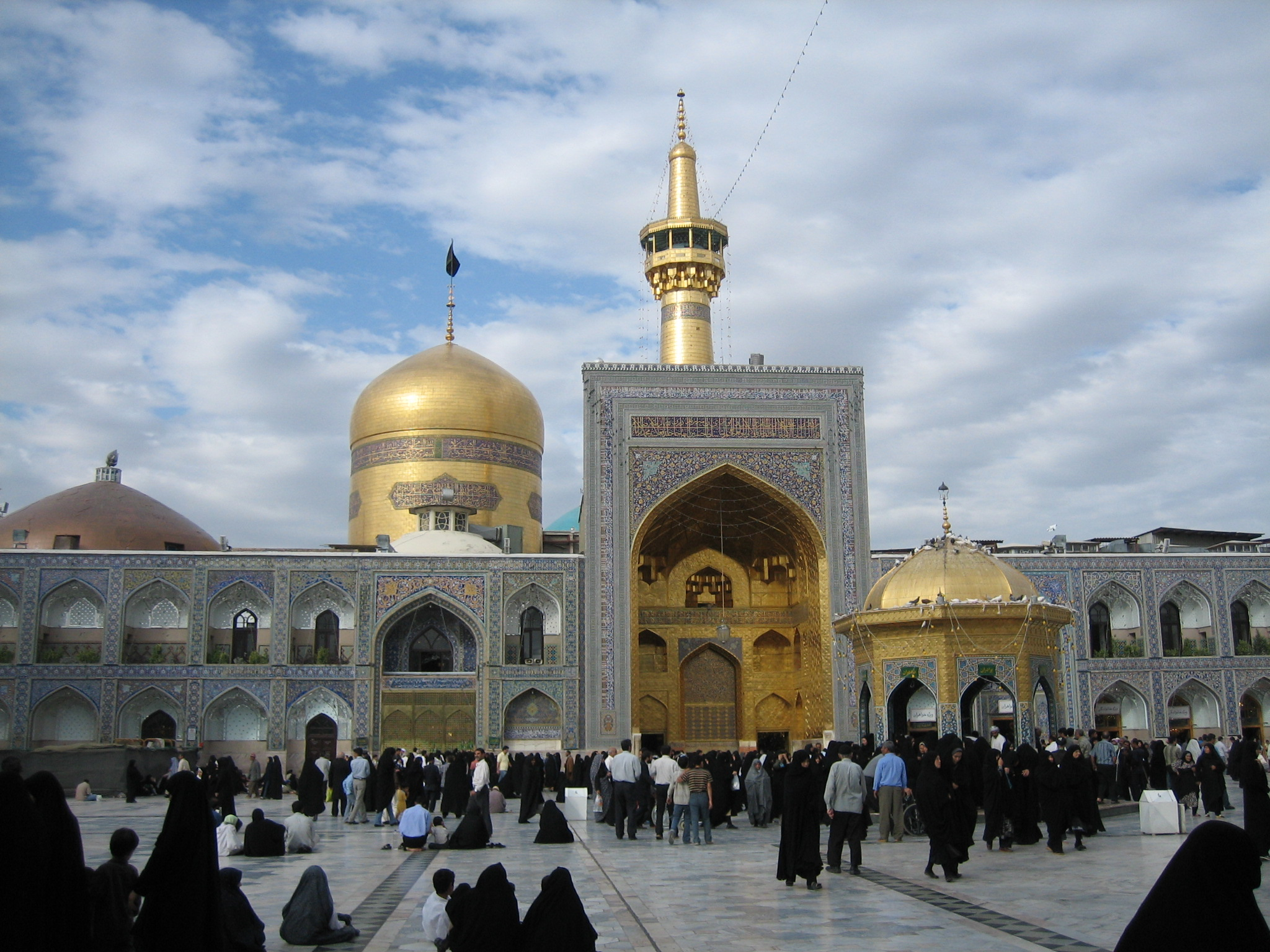
Mashhad

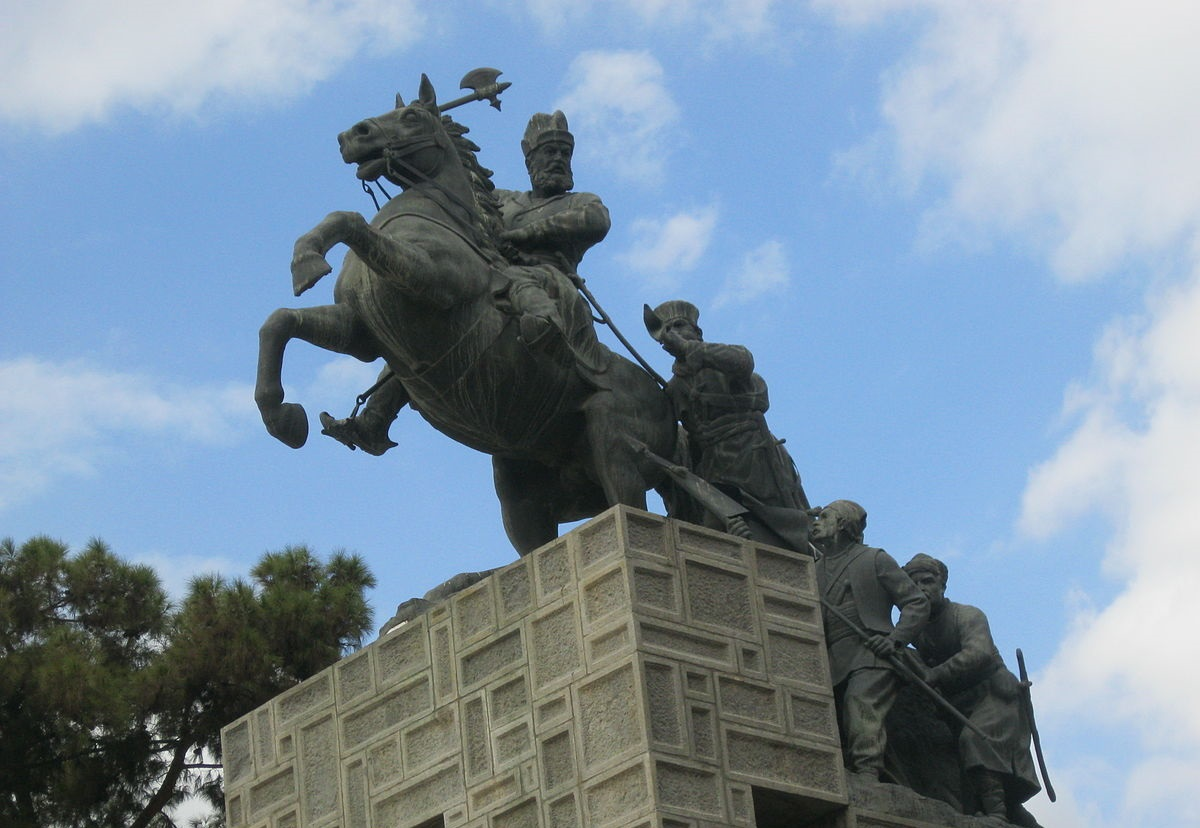
Mashhad

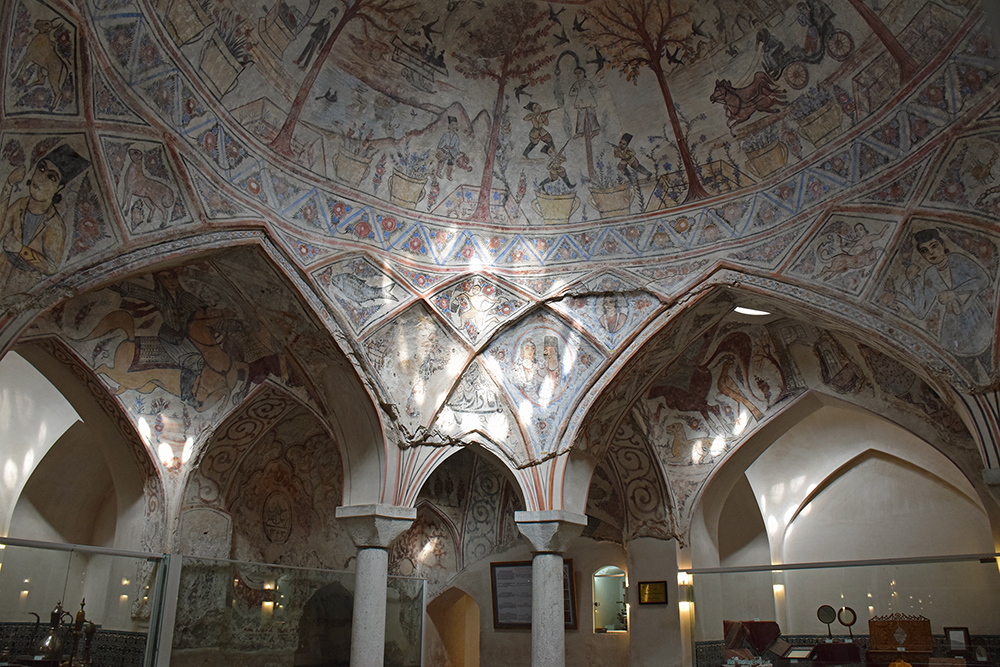
Mashhad

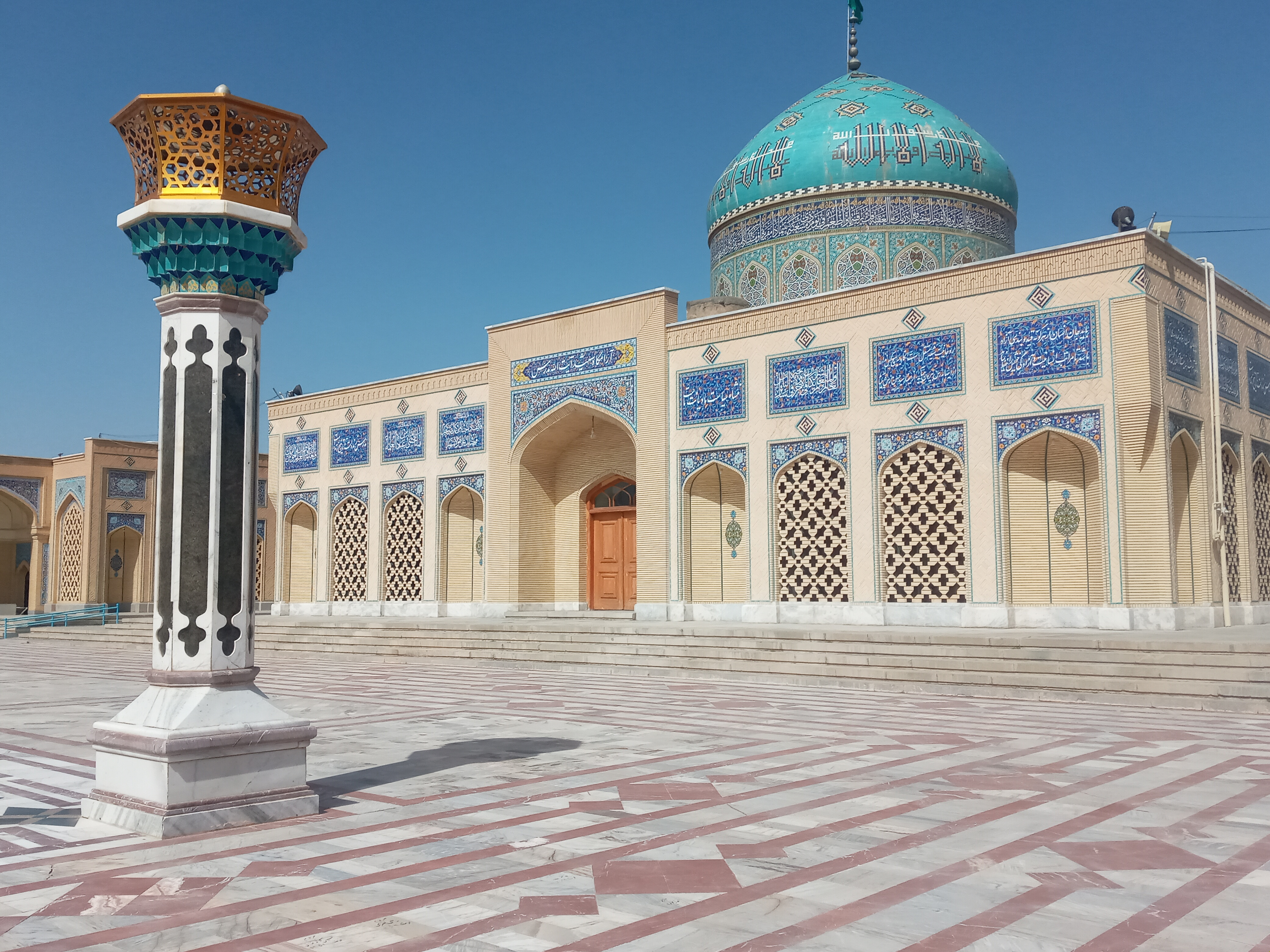
Kashmar

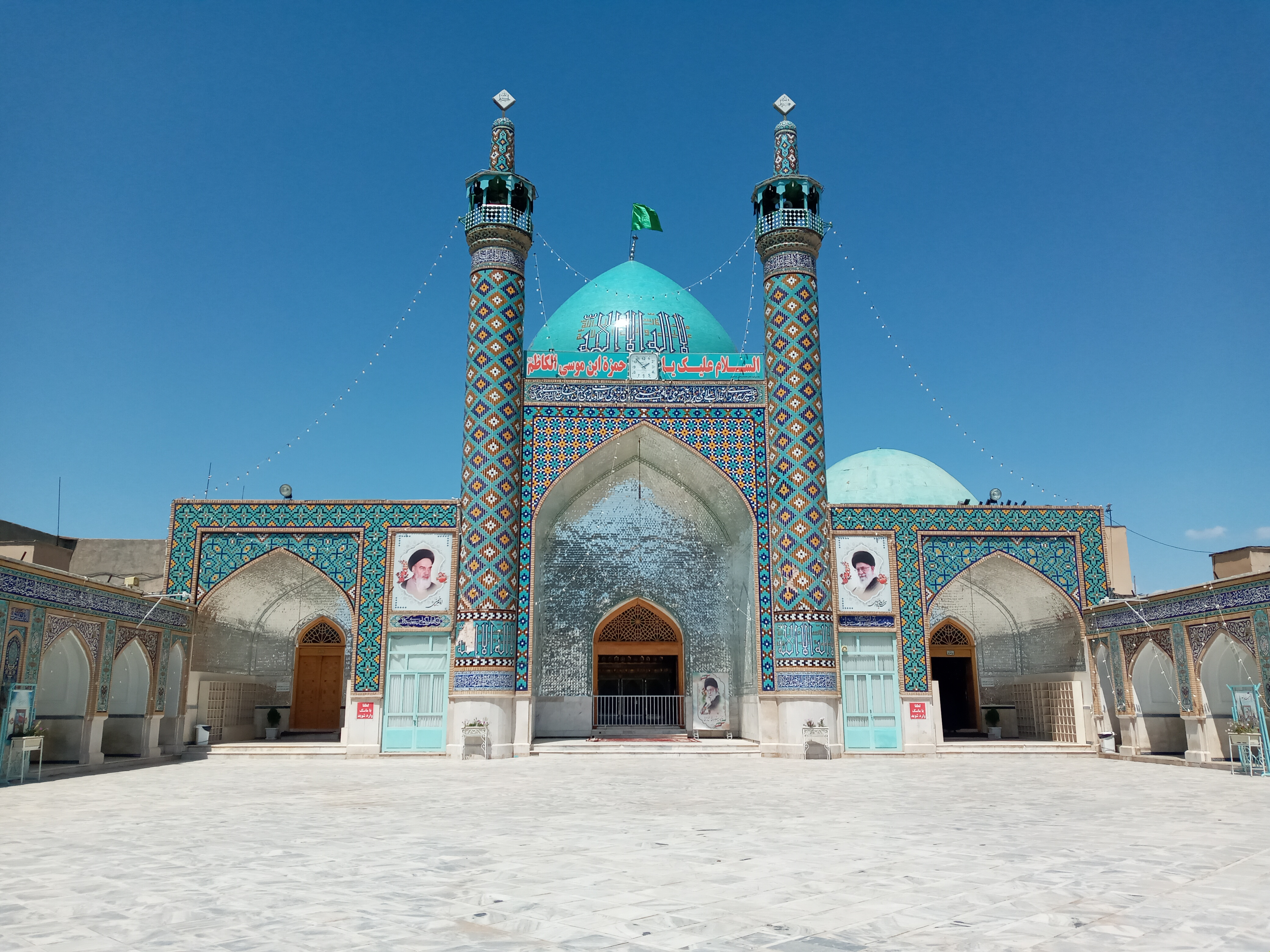
Kashmar

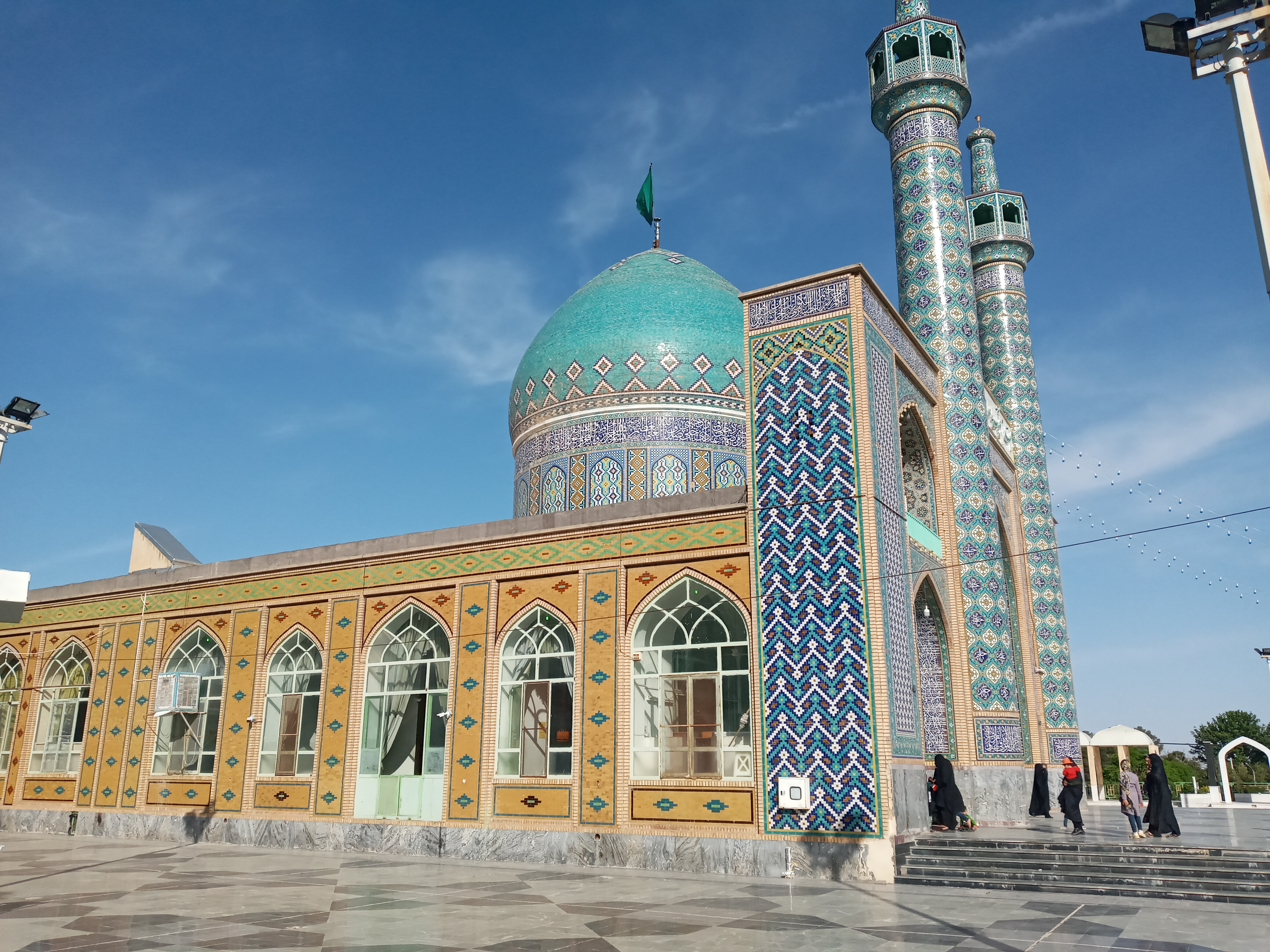
Kashmar

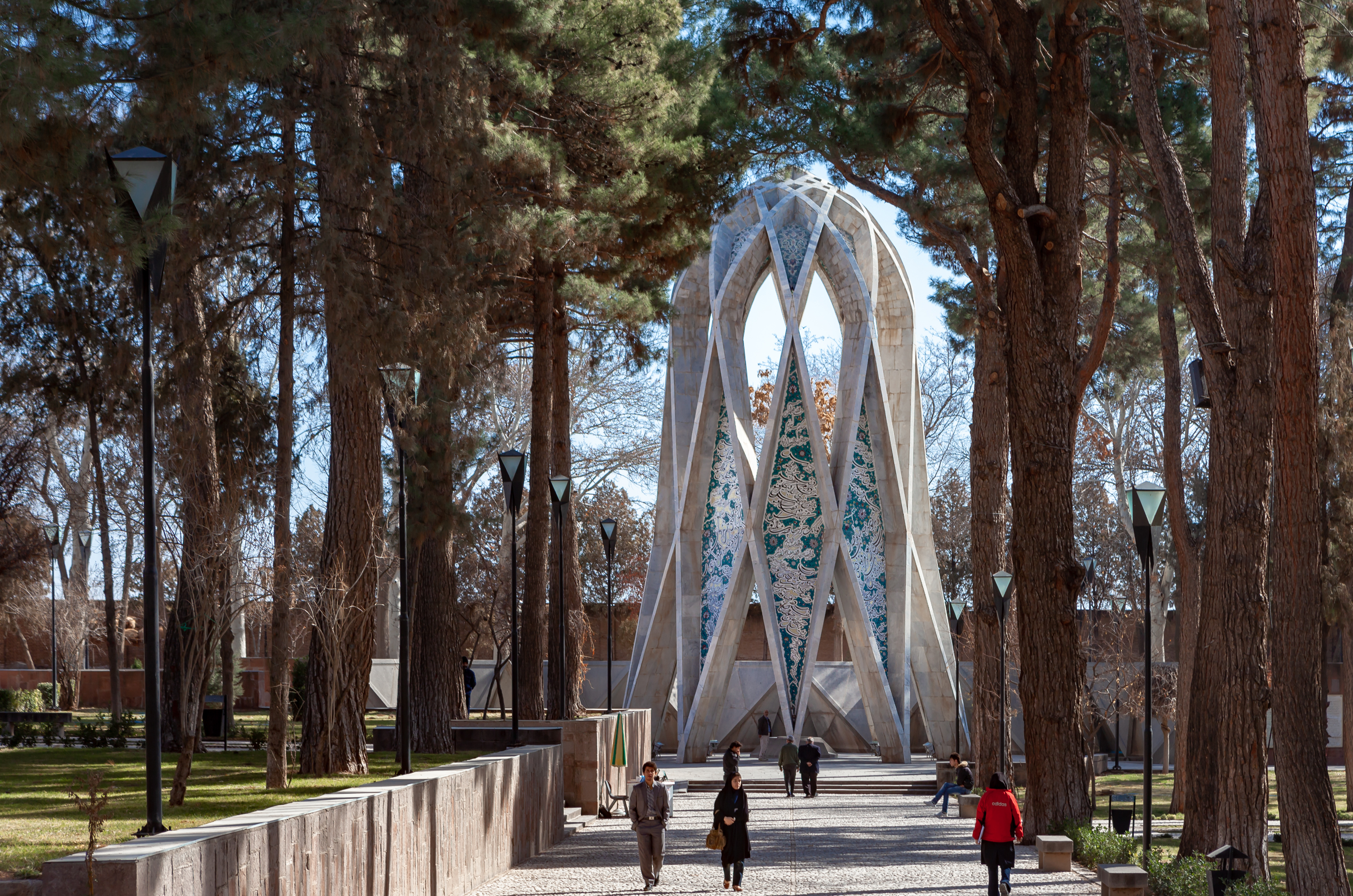
Nishapur

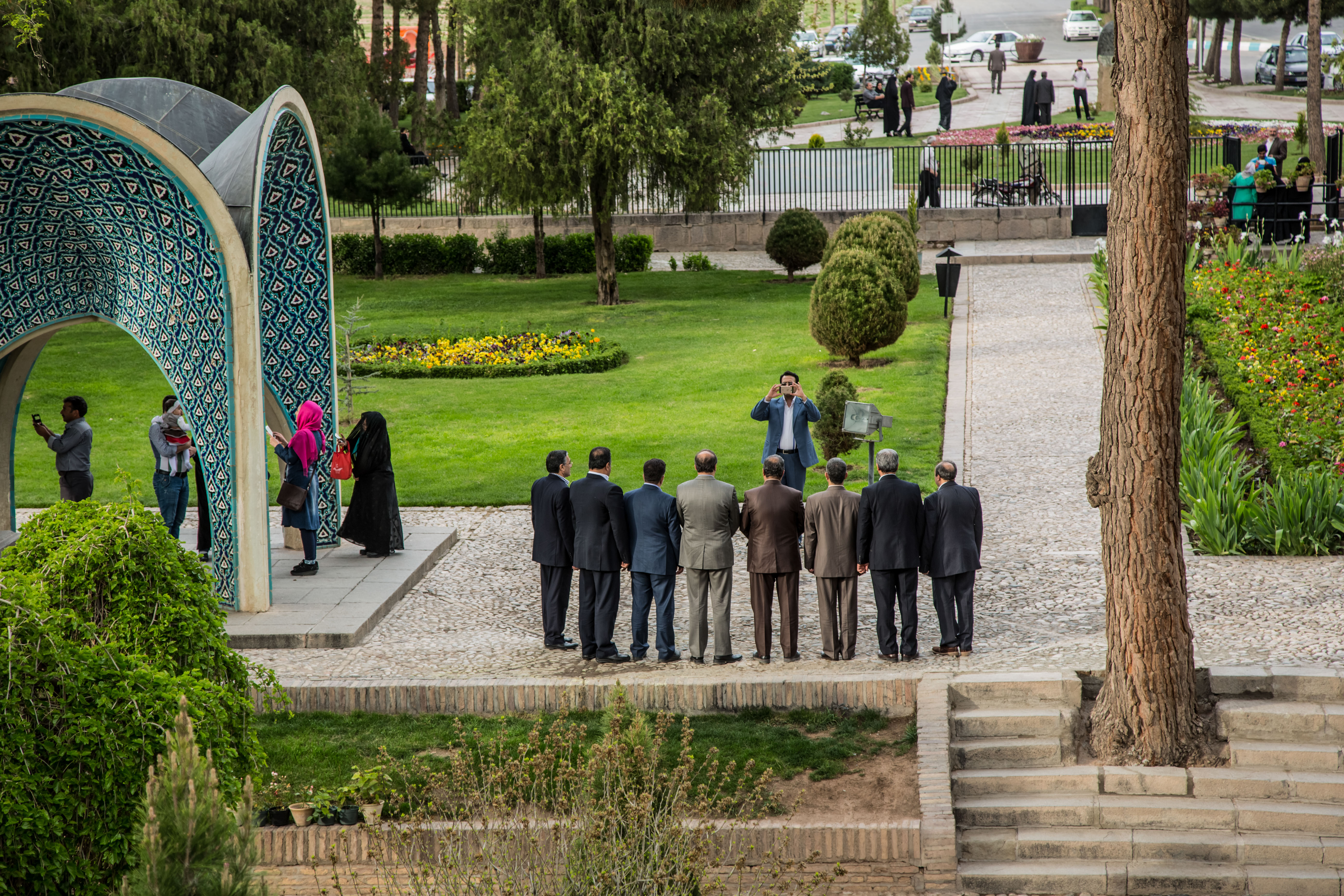
Nishapur

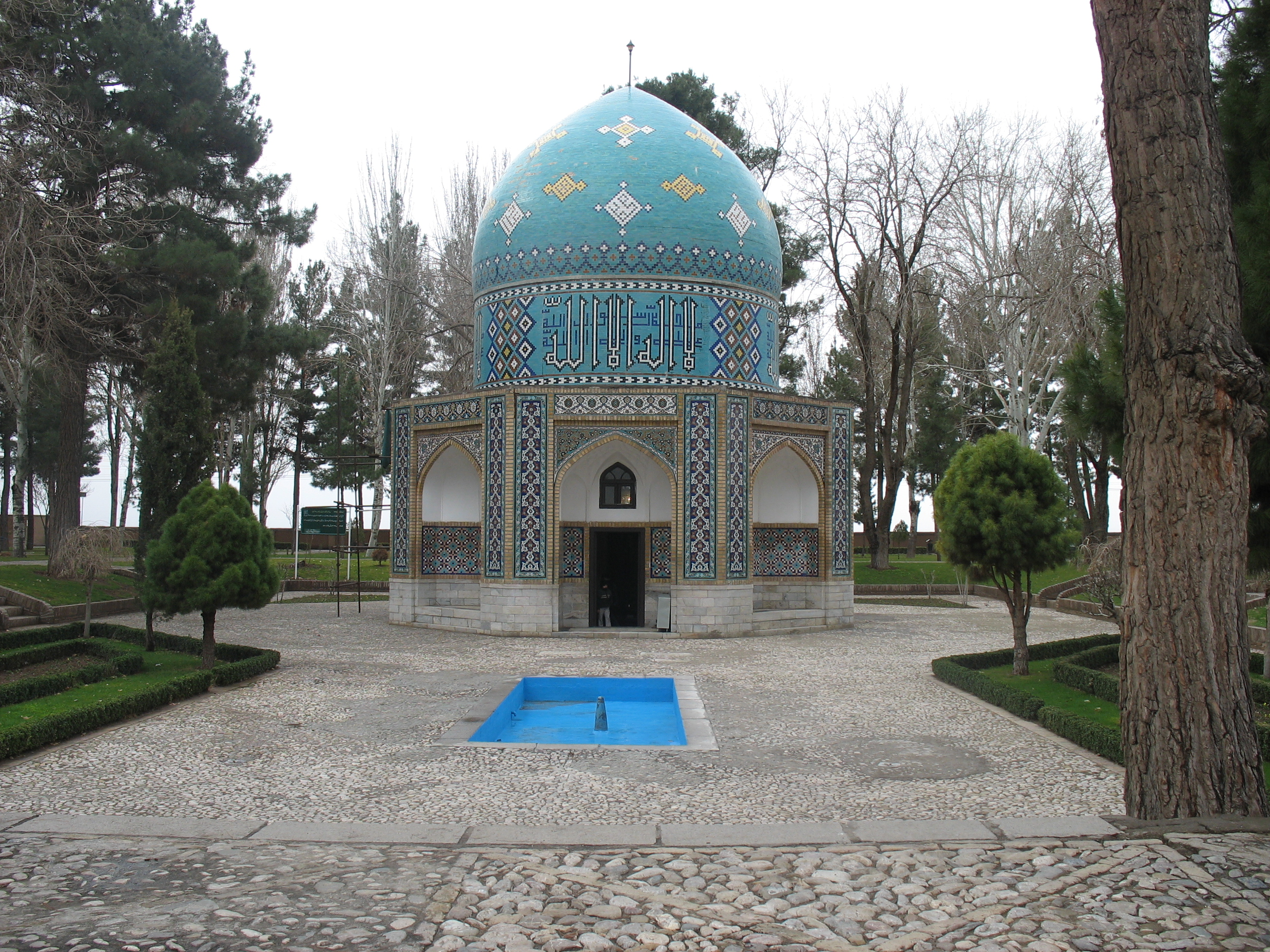
Nishapur

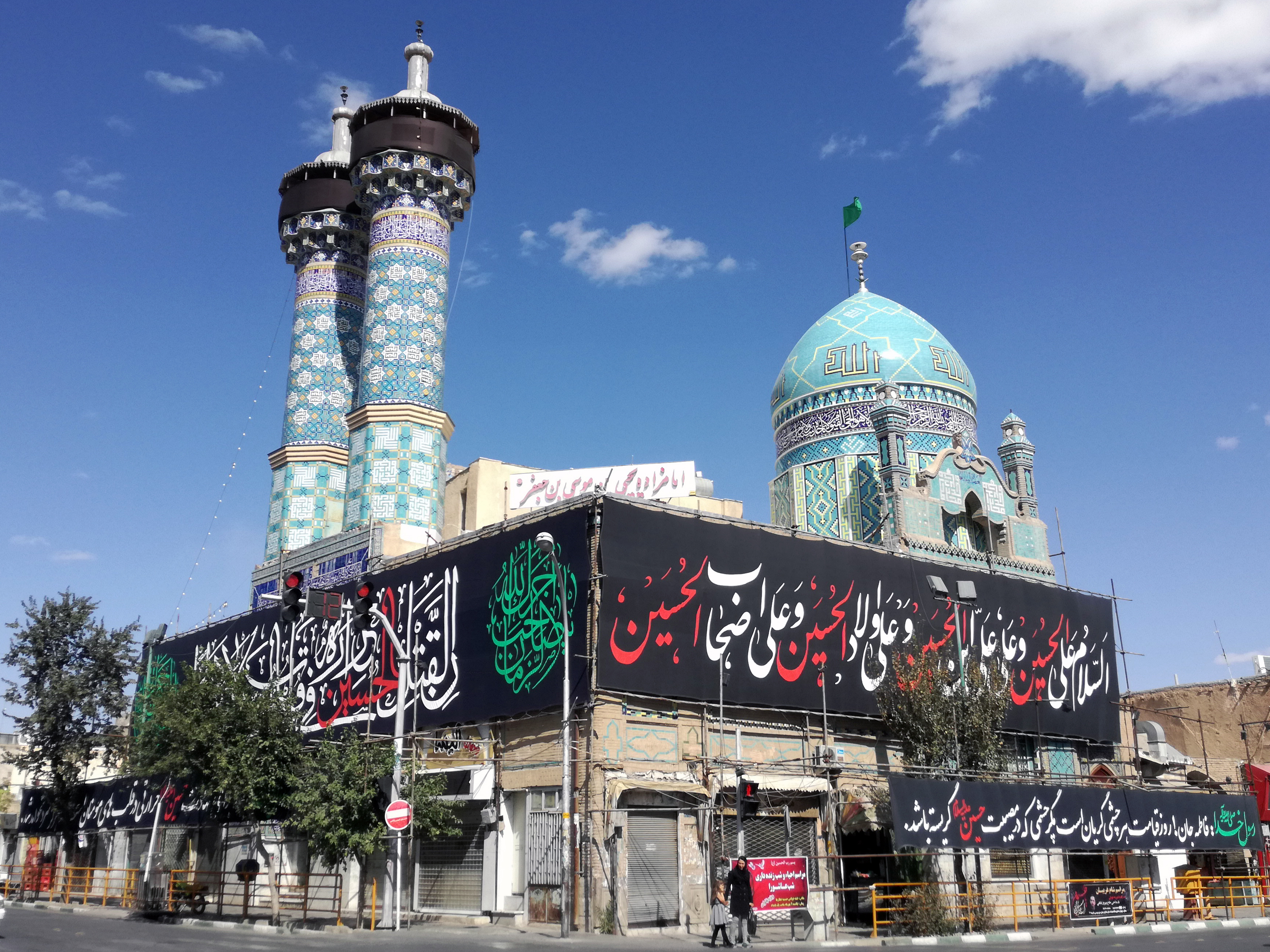
Sabzevar

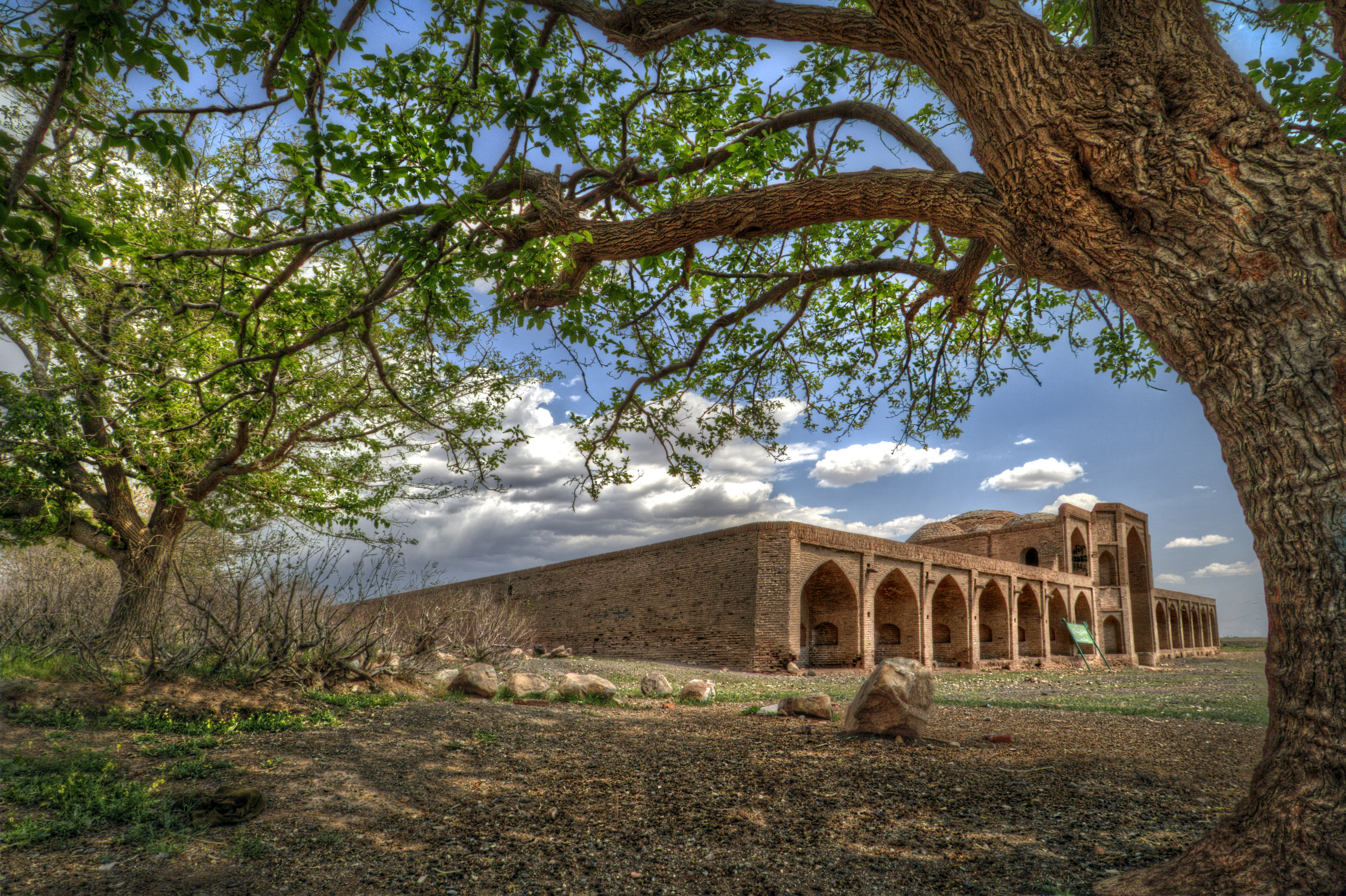
Sabzevar

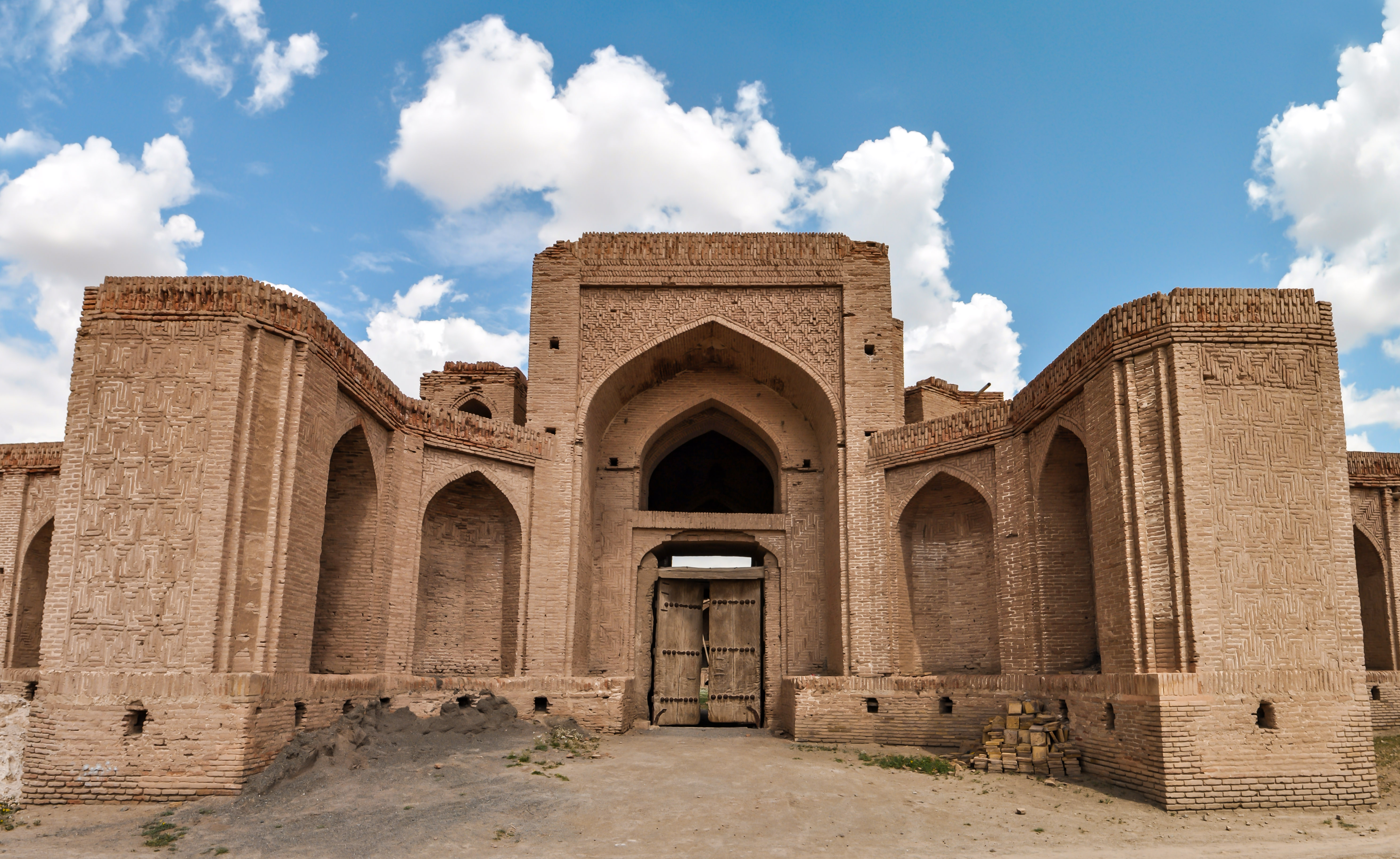
Sabzevar

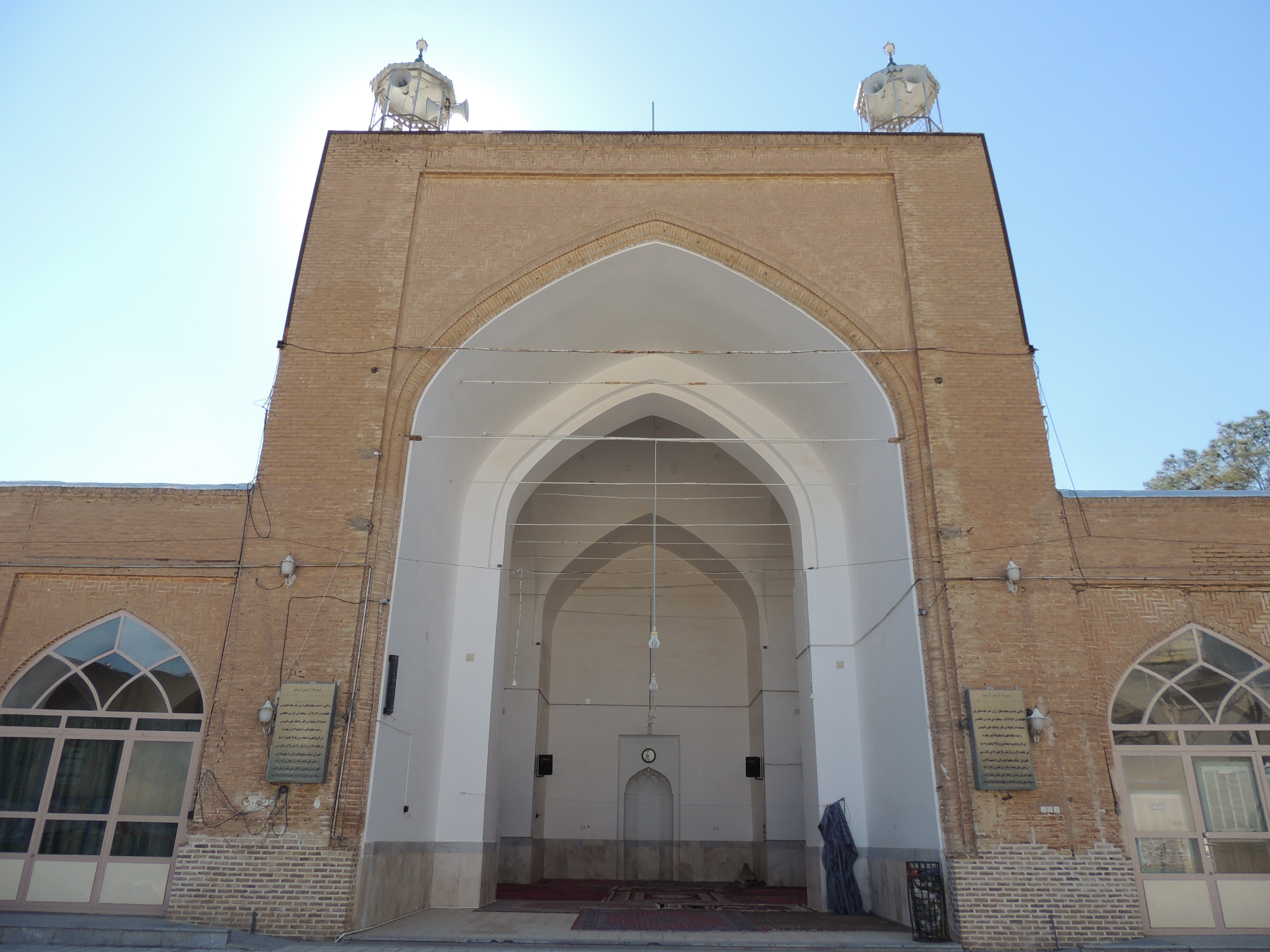
Khalilabad

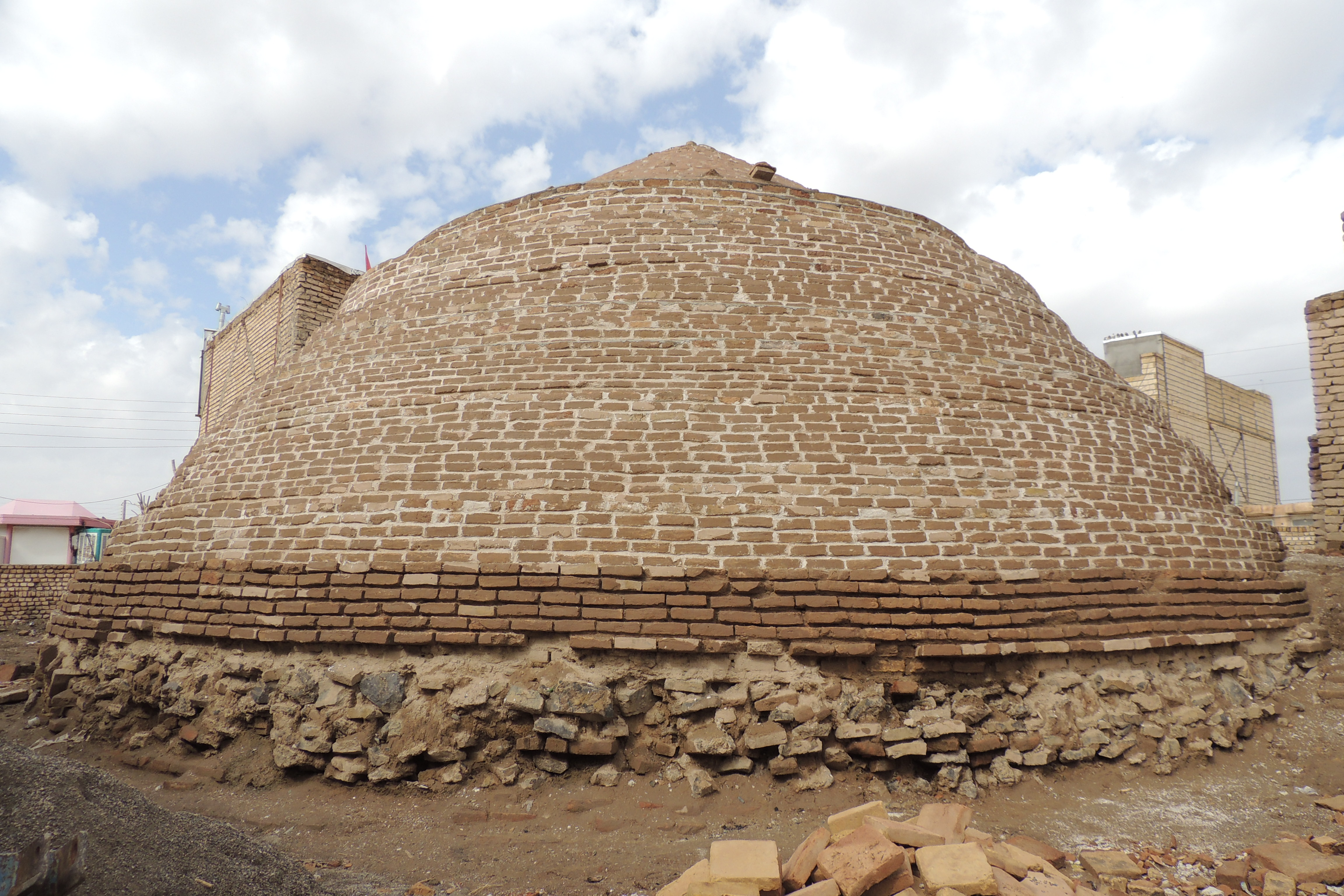
Khalilabad

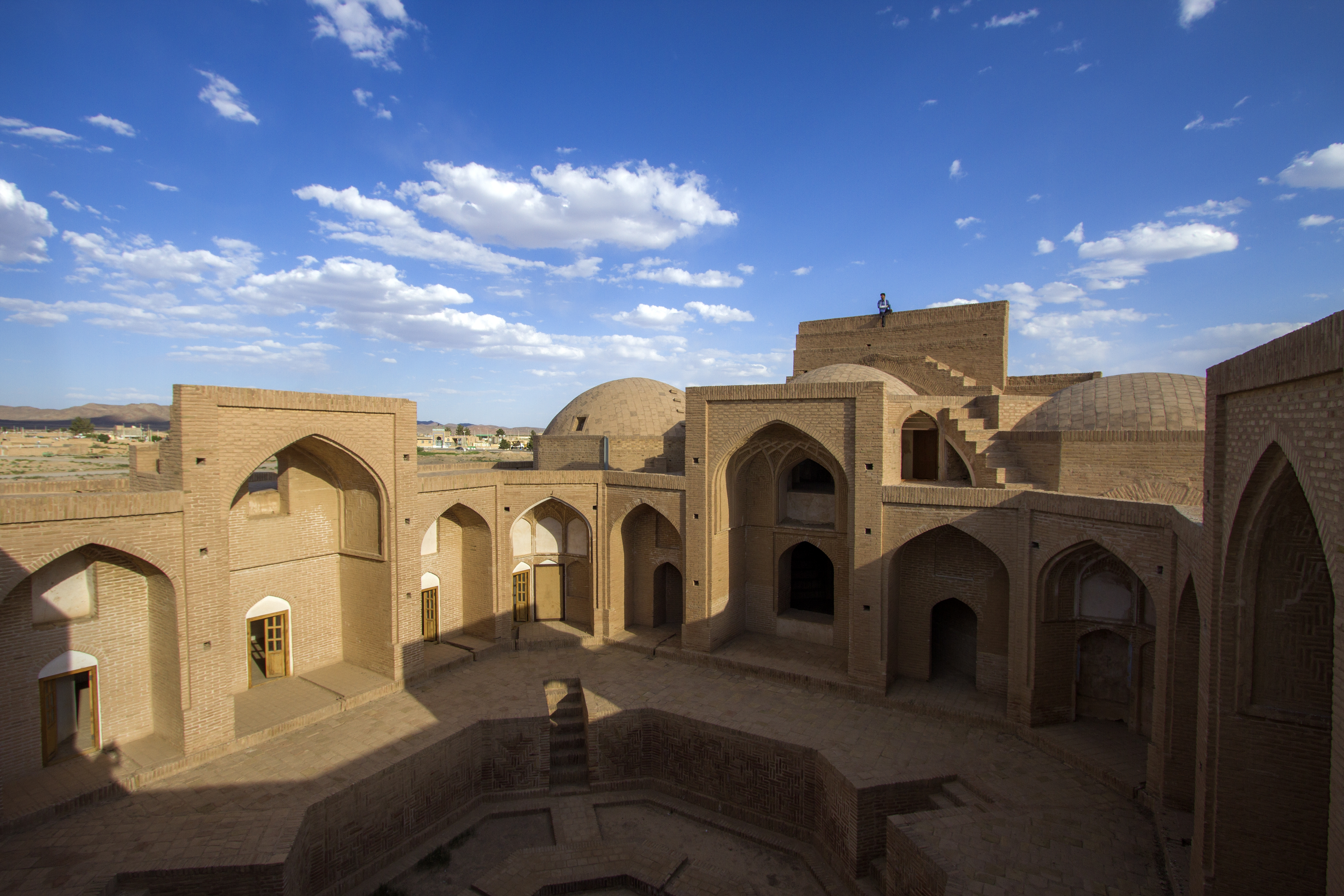
Ferdows

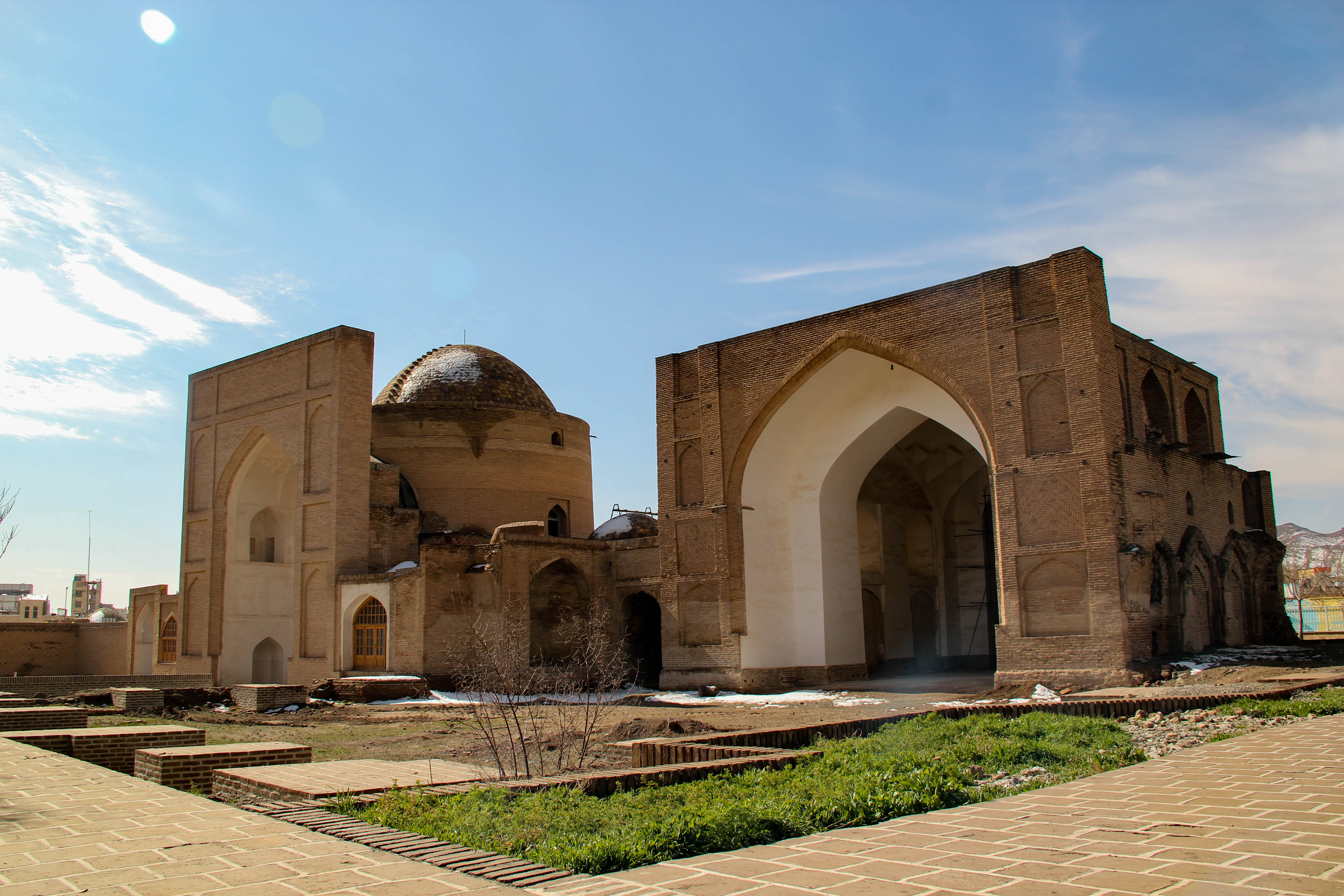
Torbat-e Heydarieh

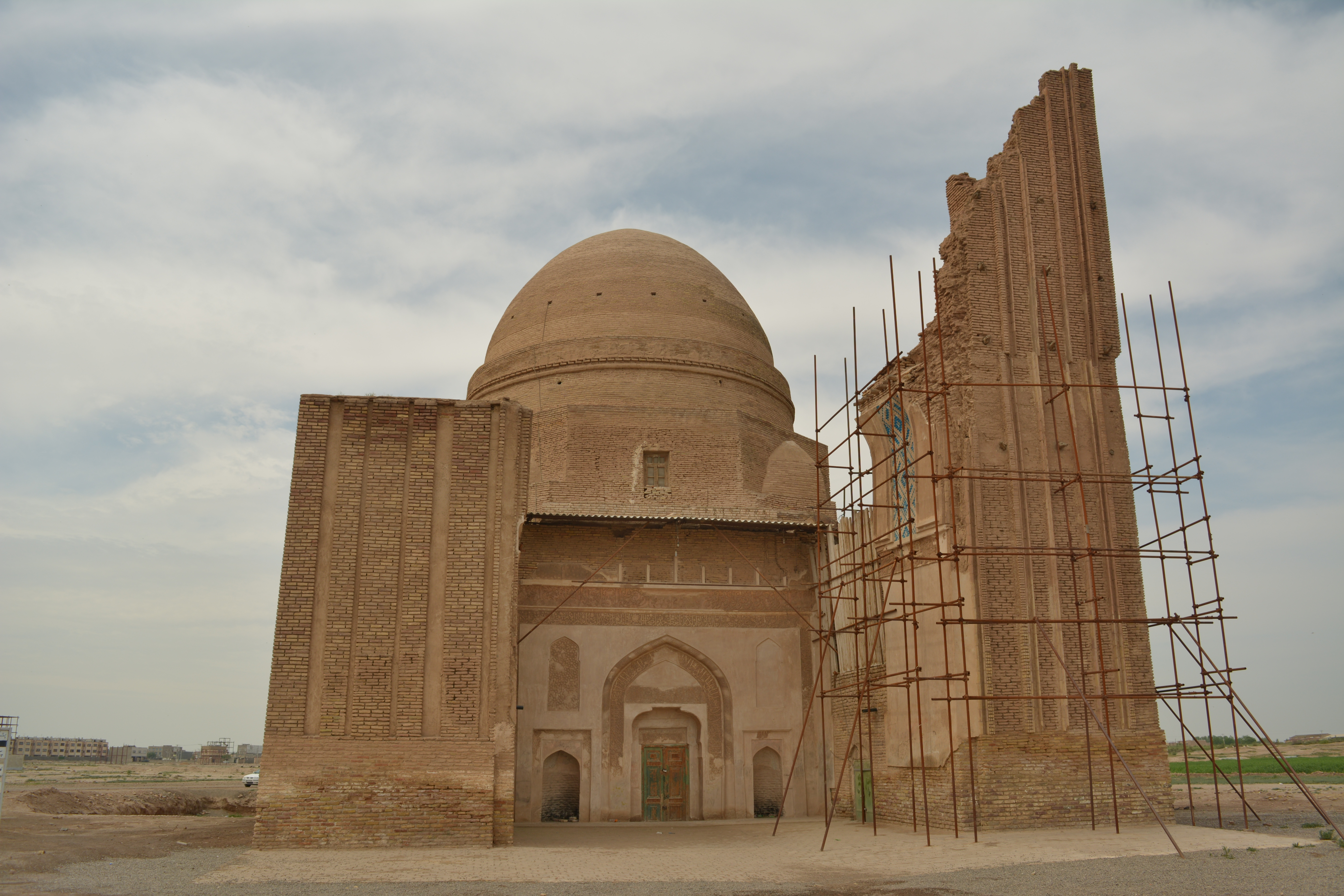
Sarakhs

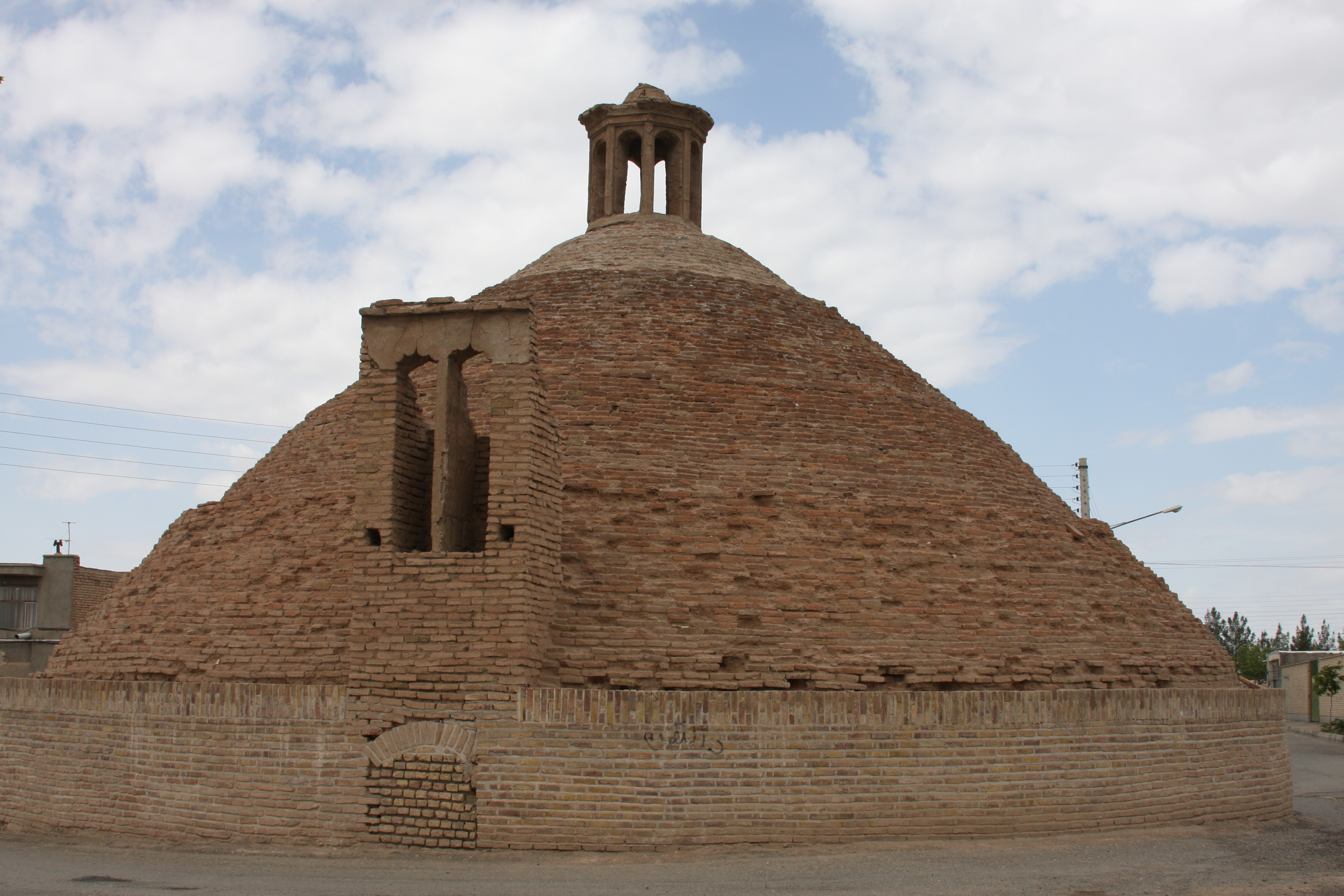
Bardaskan

== See also ==
- Greater Khorasan
- Khorasan Province
- South Khorasan Province
- North Khorasan Province

Media related to Razavi Khorasan Province at Wikimedia Commons
