= Kalateh Now =

Kalateh Now or Kalateh-ye Now or Kalateh Nau (Persian: كلاته نو) may refer to:

- Kalateh-ye Now, Bardaskan, Razavi Khorasan Province
- Kalateh-ye Now, Gonabad, Razavi Khorasan Province
- Kalateh-ye Now, Kakhk, Razavi Khorasan Province
- Kalateh-ye Now, Zaveh, Razavi Khorasan Province
- Kalateh-ye Now, Birjand, South Khorasan Province
- Kalateh-ye Now, Darmian, South Khorasan Province
- Kalateh-ye Now, Arabkhaneh, Nehbandan County, South Khorasan Province
- Kalateh-ye Now, Zirkuh, South Khorasan Province
