= Kakhk (disambiguation) =

Kakhk is a city in Razavi Khorasan Province, Iran.

Kakhk (Persian: كاخك) may also refer to:

- Kakhk, South Khorasan
- Kakhk, alternate name of Kakhkuk, South Khorasan Province
- Kakhk District, in Razavi Khorasan Province
- Kakhk Rural District, in Razavi Khorasan Province
