= Tak-e Zow =

Tak-e Zow تكزو
- Village
- Location within Iran
- Coordinates: 34°05′34″N 58°36′09″E
- Country: Iran
- Province: Razavi Khorasan
- County: Gonabad
- Bakhsh: Kakhk
- Rural District: Kakhk

Population (2006)
  - Total: 39
- Time zone: UTC+3:30 (IRST)
  - Summer (DST): UTC+4:30 (IRDT)

Tak-e Zow (Persian: تكزو; also known as Mīrzā Āqā’ī) is a village in Kakhk Rural District, Kakhk District, Gonabad County, Razavi Khorasan Province, Iran. At the 2006 census, its population was 39, in 10 families.
