= Kalateh-ye Sheykhi =

Kalateh-ye Sheykhi كلاته شيخي
- Village
- Location within Iran
- Coordinates: 34°07′45″N 58°38′53″E
- Country: Iran
- Province: Razavi Khorasan
- County: Gonabad
- Bakhsh: Kakhk
- Rural District: Kakhk

Population (2006)
  - Total: 110
- Time zone: UTC+3:30 (IRST)
  - Summer (DST): UTC+4:30 (IRDT)

Kalateh-ye Sheykhi (Persian: كلاته شيخي, also Romanized as Kalāteh-ye Sheykhī; also known as Kalāt-e Sheykhī) is a village in Kakhk Rural District, Kakhk District, Gonabad County, Razavi Khorasan Province, Iran. At the 2006 census, its population was 110, in 35 families.
