= Kalateh-ye Shams =

Kalateh-ye Shams كلاته شمس
- Village
- Location within Iran
- Coordinates: 34°09′10″N 58°44′21″E
- Country: Iran
- Province: Razavi Khorasan
- County: Gonabad
- Bakhsh: Kakhk
- Rural District: Kakhk

Population (2006)
  - Total: 83
- Time zone: UTC+3:30 (IRST)
  - Summer (DST): UTC+4:30 (IRDT)

Kalateh-ye Shams (Persian: كلاته شمس, also Romanized as Kalāteh-ye Shams) is a village in Kakhk Rural District, Kakhk District, Gonabad County, Razavi Khorasan Province, Iran. At the 2006 census, its population was 83, in 23 families.
