= Kajabad =

Kajabad كج اباد
- Village
- Location within Iran
- Coordinates: 34°10′06″N 58°29′55″E
- Country: Iran
- Province: Razavi Khorasan
- County: Gonabad
- Bakhsh: Kakhk
- Rural District: Kakhk

Population (2006)
  - Total: 33
- Time zone: UTC+3:30 (IRST)
  - Summer (DST): UTC+4:30 (IRDT)

Kajabad (Persian: كج اباد, also Romanized as Kajābād) is a village in Kakhk Rural District, Kakhk District, Gonabad County, Razavi Khorasan Province, Iran. At the 2006 census, its population was 33, in 11 families.
