= Ziruk =

Ziruk زيروك
- Village
- Location within Iran
- Coordinates: 34°04′49″N 58°37′31″E
- Country: Iran
- Province: Razavi Khorasan
- County: Gonabad
- Bakhsh: Kakhk
- Rural District: Kakhk

Population (2006)
  - Total: 32
- Time zone: UTC+3:30 (IRST)
  - Summer (DST): UTC+4:30 (IRDT)

Ziruk (Persian: زيروك, also Romanized as Zīrūk) is a village in Kakhk Rural District, Kakhk District, Gonabad County, Razavi Khorasan Province, Iran. At the 2006 census, its population was 32, in 7 families.
