= Kalāteh-ye Manşūr =

Kalāteh-ye Manşūr کلاته منصور
- Village
- Location within Iran
- Coordinates: 34°06′02″N 58°39′22″E
- Country: Iran
- Province: Razavi Khorasan
- County: Gonabad
- Bakhsh: Kakhk
- Rural District: Kakhk

Population (2006)
  - Total: 82
- Time zone: UTC+3:30 (IRST)
  - Summer (DST): UTC+4:30 (IRDT)

Kalāteh-ye Manşūr (Persian: کلاته منصور, also known as ‘Kalāteh-ye and Kalāteh-ye Shāh Manşūr) is a village in Kakhk Rural District, Kakhk District, Gonabad County, Razavi Khorasan Province, Iran. At the 2006 census, its population was 82, in 24 families.

== See also ==
- List of cities, towns and villages in Razavi Khorasan Province
