= Kisk, Razavi Khorasan =

Kisk كسك
- Village
- Location within Iran
- Coordinates: 34°06′56″N 58°42′47″E
- Country: Iran
- Province: Razavi Khorasan
- County: Gonabad
- Bakhsh: Kakhk
- Rural District: Kakhk

Population (2006)
  - Total: 20
- Time zone: UTC+3:30 (IRST)
  - Summer (DST): UTC+4:30 (IRDT)

Kisk (Persian: كسك) is a village in Kakhk Rural District, Kakhk District, Gonabad County, Razavi Khorasan Province, Iran. At the 2006 census, its population was 20, in 6 families.
