= Zu Salehabad, Razavi Khorasan =

Zu Salehabad زو صالح اباد
- Village
- Location within Iran
- Coordinates: 34°09′00″N 58°30′00″E
- Country: Iran
- Province: Razavi Khorasan
- County: Gonabad
- Bakhsh: Kakhk
- Rural District: Kakhk

Population (2006)
  - Total: 29
- Time zone: UTC+3:30 (IRST)
  - Summer (DST): UTC+4:30 (IRDT)

Zu Salehabad (Persian: زو صالح اباد, also Romanized as Zū Şāleḩābād; also known as Zū, Zū Kalāt, and Şāleḩābād) is a village in Kakhk Rural District, Kakhk District, Gonabad County, Razavi Khorasan Province, Iran. At the 2006 census, its population was 29, in 11 families.
