= Nehjaz-e Pain =

Nehjaz-e Pain نهجزپائين
- Village
- Country: Iran
- Province: Razavi Khorasan
- County: Gonabad
- Bakhsh: Kakhk
- Rural District: Kakhk

Population (2006)
  - Total: 11
- Time zone: UTC+3:30 (IRST)
  - Summer (DST): UTC+4:30 (IRDT)

Nehjaz-e Pain (Persian: نهجزپائين, also Romanized as Nehjaz-e Pā’īn) is a village in Kakhk Rural District, Kakhk District, Gonabad County, Razavi Khorasan Province, Iran. At the 2006 census, its population was 11, in 4 families.
