= Bakhtabad-e Bala =

Bakhtabad-e Bala بخت ابادبالا
- Village
- Location within Iran
- Coordinates: 34°03′54″N 58°40′12″E
- Country: Iran
- Province: Razavi Khorasan
- County: Gonabad
- Bakhsh: Kakhk
- Rural District: Kakhk

Population (2006)
  - Total: 15
- Time zone: UTC+3:30 (IRST)
  - Summer (DST): UTC+4:30 (IRDT)

Bakhtabad-e Bala (Persian: بخت ابادبالا, also Romanized as Bakhtābād-e Bālā) is a village in Kakhk Rural District, Kakhk District, Gonabad County, Razavi Khorasan Province, Iran. At the 2006 census, its population was 15, in 5 families.

== See also ==
- List of cities, towns and villages in Razavi Khorasan Province
