= Kuh-e Qaleh Sofla =

Kuh-e Qaleh Sofla كوه قلعه سفلي
- Village
- Country: Iran
- Province: Razavi Khorasan
- County: Gonabad
- Bakhsh: Kakhk
- Rural District: Kakhk

Population (2006)
  - Total: 52
- Time zone: UTC+3:30 (IRST)
  - Summer (DST): UTC+4:30 (IRDT)

Kuh-e Qaleh Sofla (Persian: كوه قلعه سفلي, also Romanized as Kūh-e Qal‘eh Soflá) is a village in Kakhk Rural District, Kakhk District, Gonabad County, Razavi Khorasan Province, Iran. At the 2006 census, its population was 52, in 16 families.
