= Najmabad, Gonabad =

Village in Razavi Khorasan province, Iran

Najmabad Persian: نجم اباد
- Village
- Location within Iran
- Coordinates: 34°12′58″N 58°48′06″E
- Country: Iran
- Province: Razavi Khorasan
- County: Gonabad
- District: Kakhk
- Rural District: Kakhk

Population (2016)
  - Total: 150
- Time zone: UTC+3:30 (IRST)

Najmabad (Persian: نجم اباد) (Note: Also romanized as Najmābād) is a village in Kakhk Rural District of Kakhk District in Gonabad County, Razavi Khorasan province, Iran.

== Demographics ==
=== Population ===
At the time of the 2006 National Census, the village's population was 112 in 39 households. The following census in 2011 counted 120 people in 40 households. The 2016 census measured the population of the village as 150 people in 51 households.
