= Kabutarkuh =

Village in Razavi Khorasan province, Iran

Kabutarkuh Persian: كبوتركوه
- Village
- Location within Iran
- Coordinates: 34°06′49″N 58°55′26″E
- Country: Iran
- Province: Razavi Khorasan
- County: Gonabad
- District: Kakhk
- Rural District: Kakhk

Population (2016)
  - Total: 158
- Time zone: UTC+3:30 (IRST)

Kabutarkuh (Persian: كبوتركوه) (Note: Also romanized as Kabūtarḵūh, Kabutrakuh, and Kabūtraḵūh) is a village in Kakhk Rural District of Kakhk District in Gonabad County, Razavi Khorasan province, Iran.

== Demographics ==
=== Population ===
At the time of the 2006 National Census, the village's population was 111 in 38 households. The following census in 2011 counted 87 people in 34 households. The 2016 census measured the population of the village as 158 people in 59 households.
