= Khanik, Razavi Khorasan =

Village in Razavi Khorasan province, Iran

Khanik Persian: خانيك
- Village
- Location within Iran
- Coordinates: 34°08′11″N 58°33′32″E
- Country: Iran
- Province: Razavi Khorasan
- County: Gonabad
- District: Kakhk
- Rural District: Kakhk

Population (2016)
  - Total: 266
- Time zone: UTC+3:30 (IRST)

Khanik (Persian: خانيك) (Note: Also romanized as Khānīk; also known as Khūnag, Khung, Khūnīg, and Khūnīk) is a village in Kakhk Rural District of Kakhk District in Gonabad County, Razavi Khorasan province, Iran.

== Demographics ==
=== Population ===
At the time of the 2006 National Census, the village's population was 350 in 169 households. The following census in 2011 counted 259 people in 138 households. The 2016 census measured the population of the village as 266 people in 143 households.
