= Rezu Sofla =

Rezu Sofla رضوسفلي
- Village
- Location within Iran
- Coordinates: 34°06′07″N 58°46′54″E
- Country: Iran
- Province: Razavi Khorasan
- County: Gonabad
- Bakhsh: Kakhk
- Rural District: Kakhk

Population (2006)
  - Total: 57
- Time zone: UTC+3:30 (IRST)
  - Summer (DST): UTC+4:30 (IRDT)

Rezu Sofla (Persian: رضوسفلي, also Romanized as Reẕū Soflá; also known as Reẕū) is a village in Kakhk Rural District, Kakhk District, Gonabad County, Razavi Khorasan Province, Iran. At the 2006 census, its population was 57, in 18 families.
