= Pochak, Razavi Khorasan =

Village in Razavi Khorasan province, Iran

Pochak Persian: پچك
- Village
- Location within Iran
- Coordinates: 34°07′43″N 58°37′44″E
- Country: Iran
- Province: Razavi Khorasan
- County: Gonabad
- District: Kakhk
- Rural District: Kakhk

Population (2016)
  - Total: 164
- Time zone: UTC+3:30 (IRST)

Pochak (Persian: پچك) (Note: Also romanized as Pachk; also known as Parch) is a village in Kakhk Rural District of Kakhk District in Gonabad County, Razavi Khorasan province, Iran.

== Demographics ==
=== Population ===
At the time of the 2006 National Census, the village's population was 275 in 99 households. The following census in 2011 counted 227 people in 94 households. The 2016 census measured the population of the village as 164 people in 75 households.
