= Ostad, Gonabad =

Village in Razavi Khorasan province, Iran

Ostad Persian: استاد
- Village
- Location within Iran
- Coordinates: 34°07′42″N 58°46′30″E
- Country: Iran
- Province: Razavi Khorasan
- County: Gonabad
- District: Kakhk
- Rural District: Kakhk

Population (2016)
  - Total: 407
- Time zone: UTC+3:30 (IRST)

Ostad (Persian: استاد) (Note: Also romanized as Ostād) is a village in Kakhk Rural District of Kakhk District in Gonabad County, Razavi Khorasan province, Iran.

== Demographics ==
=== Population ===
At the time of the 2006 National Census, the village's population was 303 in 109 households. The following census in 2011 counted 300 people in 108 households. The 2016 census measured the population of the village as 407 people in 134 households, the most populous in its rural district.
