= Marghesh =

Marghesh or Marghash (Persian: مرغش) may refer to:

- Marghesh, Gonabad
- Marghesh, Mashhad
