= Disfan =

Village in Razavi Khorasan province, Iran

Disfan Persian: ديسفان
- Village
- Location within Iran
- Coordinates: 34°09′42″N 58°34′49″E
- Country: Iran
- Province: Razavi Khorasan
- County: Gonabad
- District: Kakhk
- Rural District: Kakhk

Population (2016)
  - Total: 278
- Time zone: UTC+3:30 (IRST)

Disfan (Persian: ديسفان) (Note: Also romanized as Dīsfān) is a village in Kakhk Rural District of Kakhk District in Gonabad County, Razavi Khorasan province, Iran.

== Demographics ==
=== Population ===
At the time of the 2006 National Census, the village's population was 285 in 153 households. The following census in 2011 counted 237 people in 139 households. The 2016 census measured the population of the village as 278 people in 150 households.
