= Kalateh-ye Now, Kakhk =

Village in Razavi Khorasan province, Iran

Kalateh-ye Now Persian: كلاته نو
- Village
- Location within Iran
- Coordinates: 34°05′41″N 58°35′08″E
- Country: Iran
- Province: Razavi Khorasan
- County: Gonabad
- District: Kakhk
- Rural District: Kakhk

Population (2016)
  - Total: 93
- Time zone: UTC+3:30 (IRST)

Kalateh-ye Now (Persian: كلاته نو) (Note: Also romanized as Kalāteh-ye Now) is a village in Kakhk Rural District of Kakhk District in Gonabad County, Razavi Khorasan province, Iran.

== Demographics ==
=== Population ===
At the time of the 2006 National Census, the village's population was 115 in 31 households. The following census in 2011 counted 94 people in 27 households. The 2016 census measured the population of the village as 93 people in 31 households.
