= Rezu =

Rezu may refer to:

- Rezu, Japanese lesbianism in erotica
- Rezu, Iran, a village in Kerman Province, Iran
- Rezu Sofla, a village in Razavi Khorasan Province, Iran
