= Kalat-e Now =

Kalat-e Now (Persian: کلات نو) may refer to:

- Kalat-e Now, Darmian
- Kalat-e Now, Nehbandan
