= Karsh =

Karsh may refer to:

People

- Efraim Karsh, historian of the Middle East
- Malak Karsh (1915–2001), Canadian photographer, brother of Yousuf
- Yousuf Karsh (1908–2002), Canadian photographer, brother of Malak
- Karsh Kale, Indian American electronic musician

Fictional characters

- Karsh, a character in the PlayStation video game Chrono Cross
- Karsh, the wraith that was once the former Captain Carthean of Arnor in The Rise of the Witch-king

Other

- Kantele, a Finnic zither, known as the karsh among the Vola-Finnic Mari people
- Karsh, Iran, a village in Razavi Khorasan Province, Iran
