= Shahrah =

Shahrah (Persian: شهراه) may refer to:

- Shahrah, Razavi Khorasan
- Shah Rah, Razavi Khorasan Province
- Shahrah, South Khorasan
