= Marghesh, Gonabad =

Village in Razavi Khorasan province, Iran

Marghesh Persian: مرغش
- Village
- Location within Iran
- Coordinates: 34°08′42″N 58°40′31″E
- Country: Iran
- Province: Razavi Khorasan
- County: Gonabad
- District: Kakhk
- Rural District: Kakhk

Population (2016)
  - Total: 153
- Time zone: UTC+3:30 (IRST)

Marghesh (Persian: مرغش) is a village in, and the capital of, Kakhk Rural District in Kakhk District of Gonabad County, Razavi Khorasan province, Iran.

== Demographics ==
=== Population ===
At the time of the 2006 National Census, the village's population was 104 in 40 households. The following census in 2011 counted 59 people in 28 households. The 2016 census measured the population of the village as 153 people in 58 households.
