= Forud Castle =

Castle in Razavi Khorasan Province, Iran

Forud Fort
- قلعه فرود
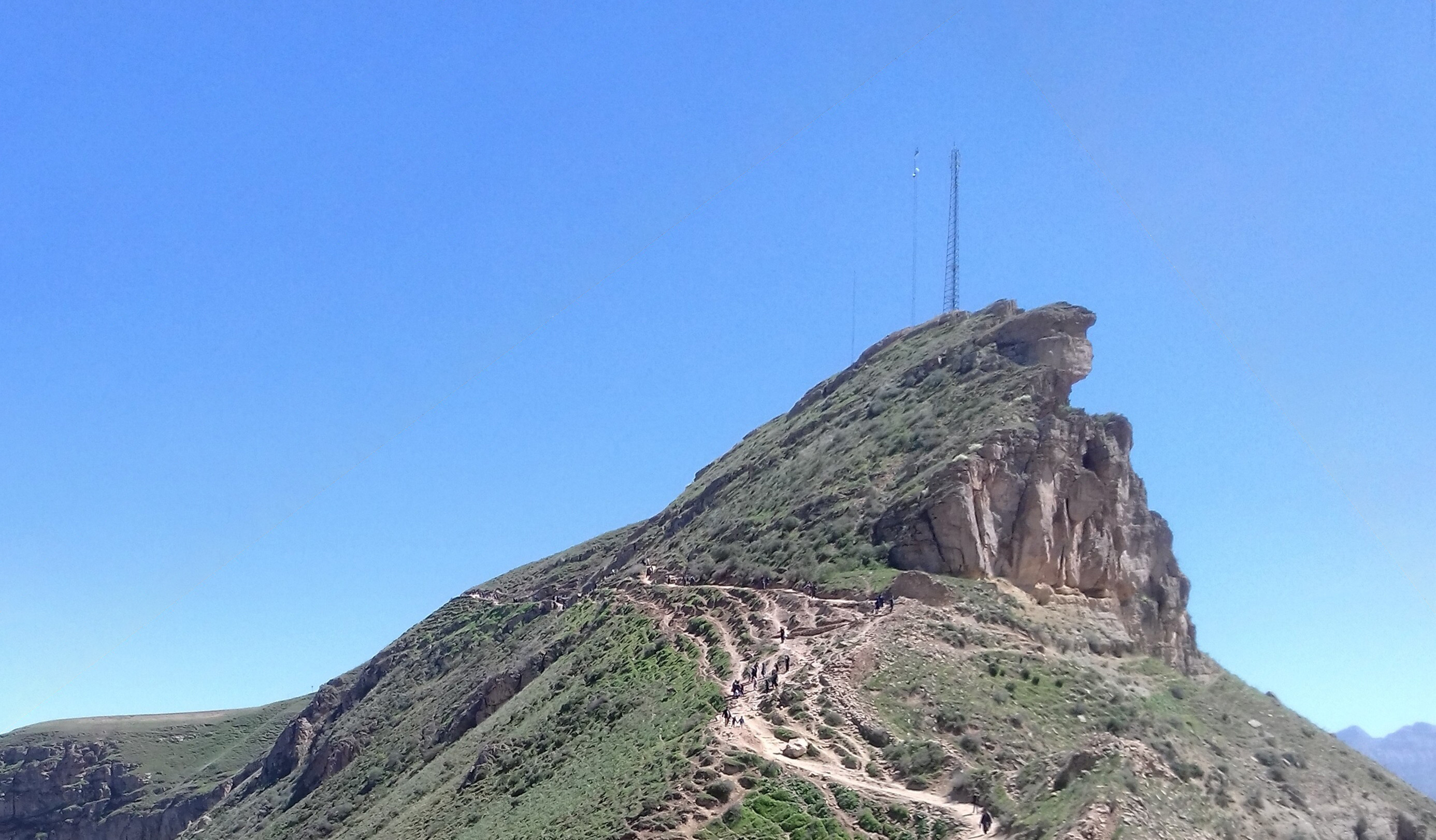

General information
- Type: Castle
- Location: Gonabad County, Iran
- Coordinates: 37°03′05″N 59°39′29″E
- Renovation cost

Iran National Heritage List
- Official name: Forud Fort
- Type: Ruins
- Designated: 1967
- Reference no.: 670
- Conservation organization: Cultural Heritage, Handicrafts and Tourism Organization of Iran

Forud Fort (Persian: قلعه فرود) is a historical castle located in Gonabad County in Razavi Khorasan Province, The longevity of this fortress dates back to the Parthian Empire.
