= Kalateh-ye Now, Howmeh =

Kalateh-ye Now كلاته نو
- Village
- Location within Iran
- Coordinates: 34°30′09″N 58°30′42″E
- Country: Iran
- Province: Razavi Khorasan
- County: Gonabad
- Bakhsh: Central
- Rural District: Howmeh

Population (2006)
  - Total: 63
- Time zone: UTC+3:30 (IRST)
  - Summer (DST): UTC+4:30 (IRDT)

Kalateh-ye Now (Persian: كلاته نو, also Romanized as Kalāteh-ye Now) is a village in Howmeh Rural District, in the Central District of Gonabad County, Razavi Khorasan Province, Iran. At the 2006 census, its population was 63, in 15 families.
