= Kūh-Zibad =

Mountain in Iran

Kūh-e Zibad. Peak Tīr Māhī
- Zeebad
- Location within Iran

Highest point
- Elevation: 2,126 m (6,975 ft)
- Prominence: 2,557 m (8,389 ft)
- Coordinates: 34.23963°N 58.41917°E

Naming
- Etymology: Tir has many meaning :arrow ,bar,shot and also the persian month for July
- Native name: قله تیر ماهی.کوه زیبد (Persian)
- Pronunciation: Zeebad

Geography
- Location: Razavi Khorasan, Iran

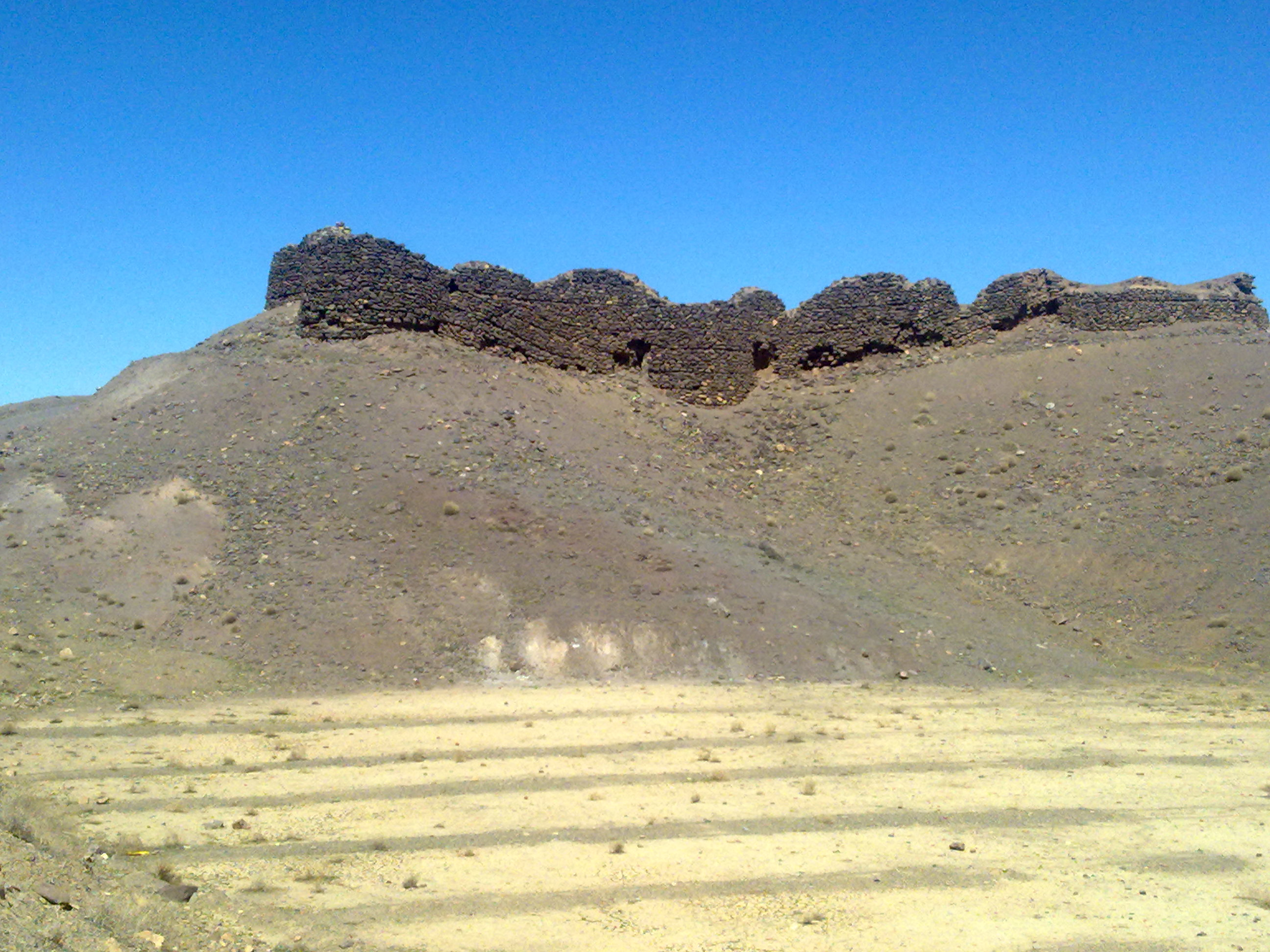
Zibad

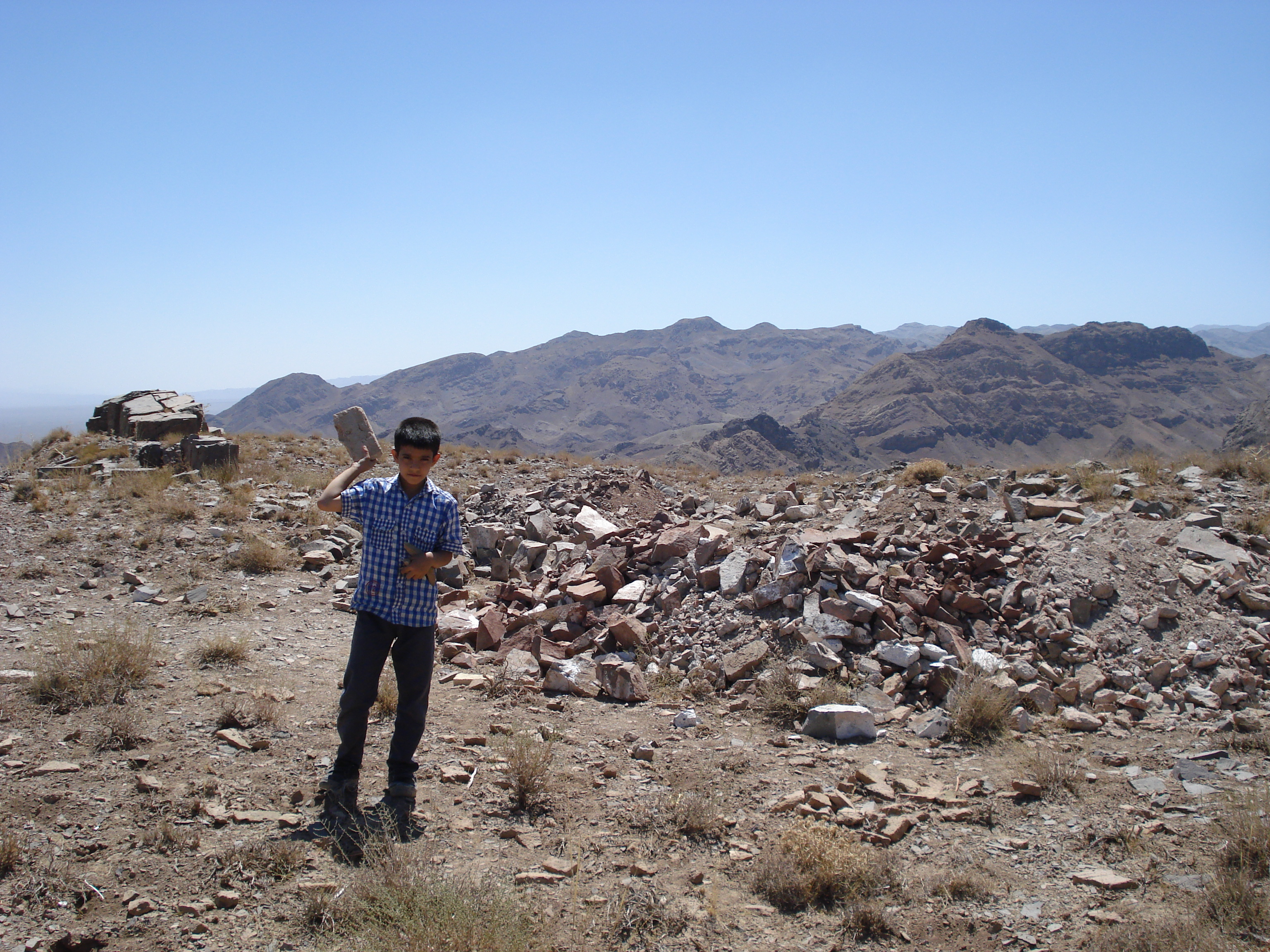
TirMahi

Kūh-Zibad (Persian: کوه زیبد) its peak also called Tir Mahi is a mountain in the province of Razavi Khorasan, city of Gonabad District Zibad in the eastern part of the country, 700 km east of the capital Tehran. The Peak of the Moantain is called Qole -e Tir Mahi is 2,557 metres (8,389 ft) above sea level, or 431 m (1,414 ft) above the surrounding terrain . The width at the base is 5.5 km. The terrain around the Qole-e Tir Mahi and Kuh-e zibad is mainly hilly. The highest point in the vicinity is 2775 meters above sea level, 17.7 km southeast of Qole-e Tir mahi. The area surrounding Kuh-e Zibad is very sparsely populated, having only 5 inhabitants per square kilometer, with the nearest settlement of any size being the village of Zibad, 8.5 km to the north of the mountain. The terrain abutting Kuh-e Zibad is largely barren, with little or no vegetation, thanks to its cold steppe climate and yet - unusually - boasts many named mountains and valleys. The average annual temperature in the area is 17 °C with the warmest month being July when the average temperature is 30 °C, and the coldest, January, with 1 °C. The average annual rainfall is 211 mm (8 in) with the rainiest month being February, with an average of 58 mm (2 in) of precipitation, and the driest, July, with 1 mm. Thanks to a celebrated episode in the poet Ferdowsi’s colossal epic Shahnameh the mountain is famed as the site of Davazdah Rokh (the legendary Battle of the Twelve Combats) and its eastern part is known as The Black Mountain or Kūh-e Gonabad. The long mountain range is called Qohestan and it extends from Bajestan to Birjand near the border with Afghanistan. This mountain range separates south khorasan from Razavi Khorasan, part of this mountain range near Kakhk is called black mountain or kuh e gonabad.

Kūh-e Tīr Māhī

Climate chart (precipitation, max. and min. temperature)
J	F	M	A	M	J	J	A	S	O	N	D
29 4 −6	58 9 −5	37 20 1	25 29 7	7 36 11	3 42 17	1 42 19	2 41 18	1 38 14	5 31 10	21 20 1	22 9 −5
- █ Average max. and min. temperatures in °C
- █ Precipitation totals in mm
Imperial conversion
J	F	M	A	M	J	J	A	S	O	N	D
1.1 39 21	2.3 48 23	1.5 68 34	1 84 45	0.3 97 52	0.1 108 63	0 108 66	0.1 106 64	0 100 57	0.2 88 50	0.8 68 34	0.9 48 23
- █ Average max. and min. temperatures in °F
- █ Precipitation totals in inches

== See also ==
- Zibad Castle
- Zibad
- Davazdah Rokh
- Bajestan
- Ferdous
- Birjand

== Sources ==
Article in Persian language. Parssea magazine,2011

- Geography and tribe and minority in khorasan,Mohammad Ajam, research published 1992, university of Imam Sadegh,Tehran.

== Gallery ==
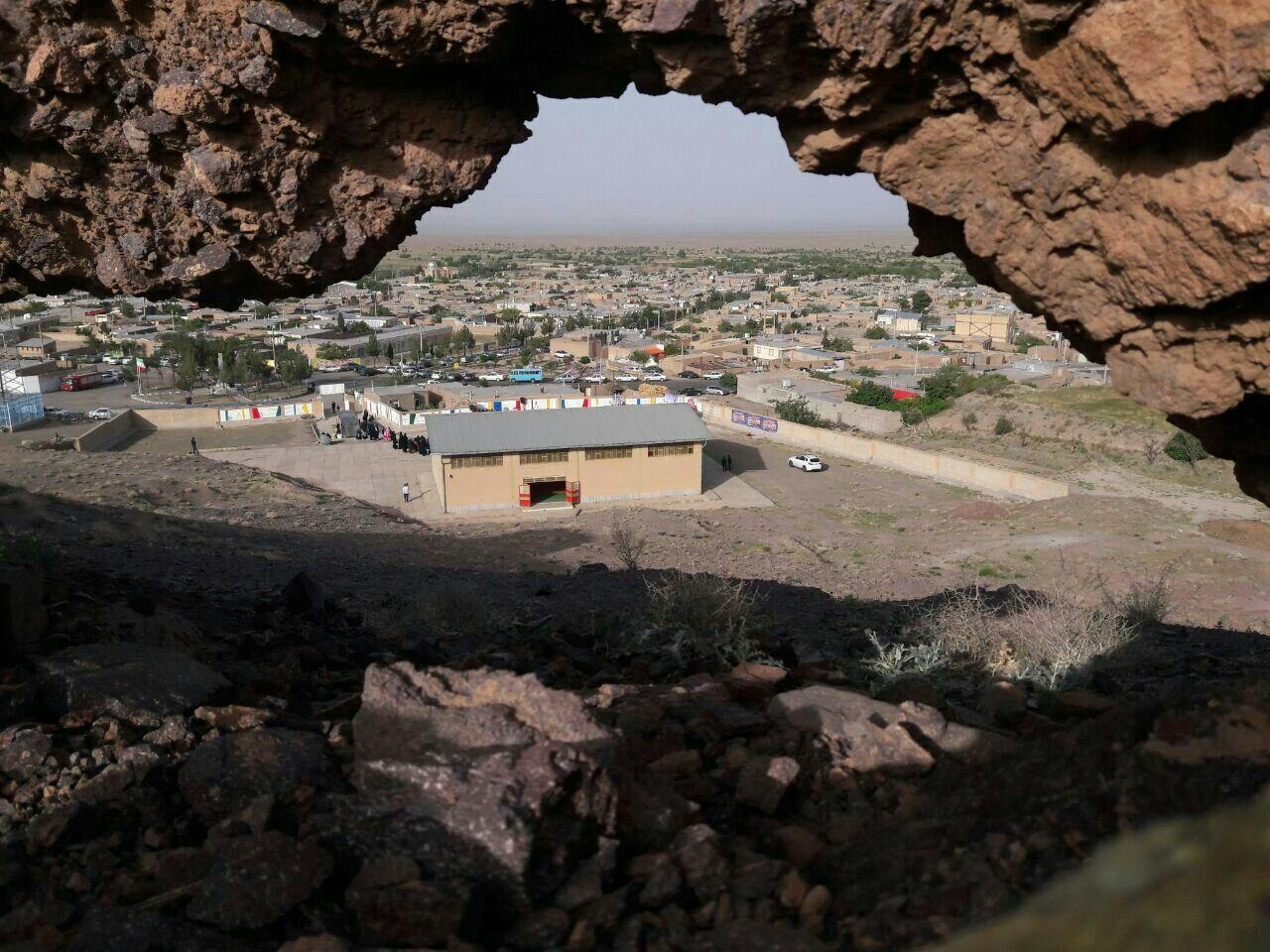
Zibad Castle زیبد

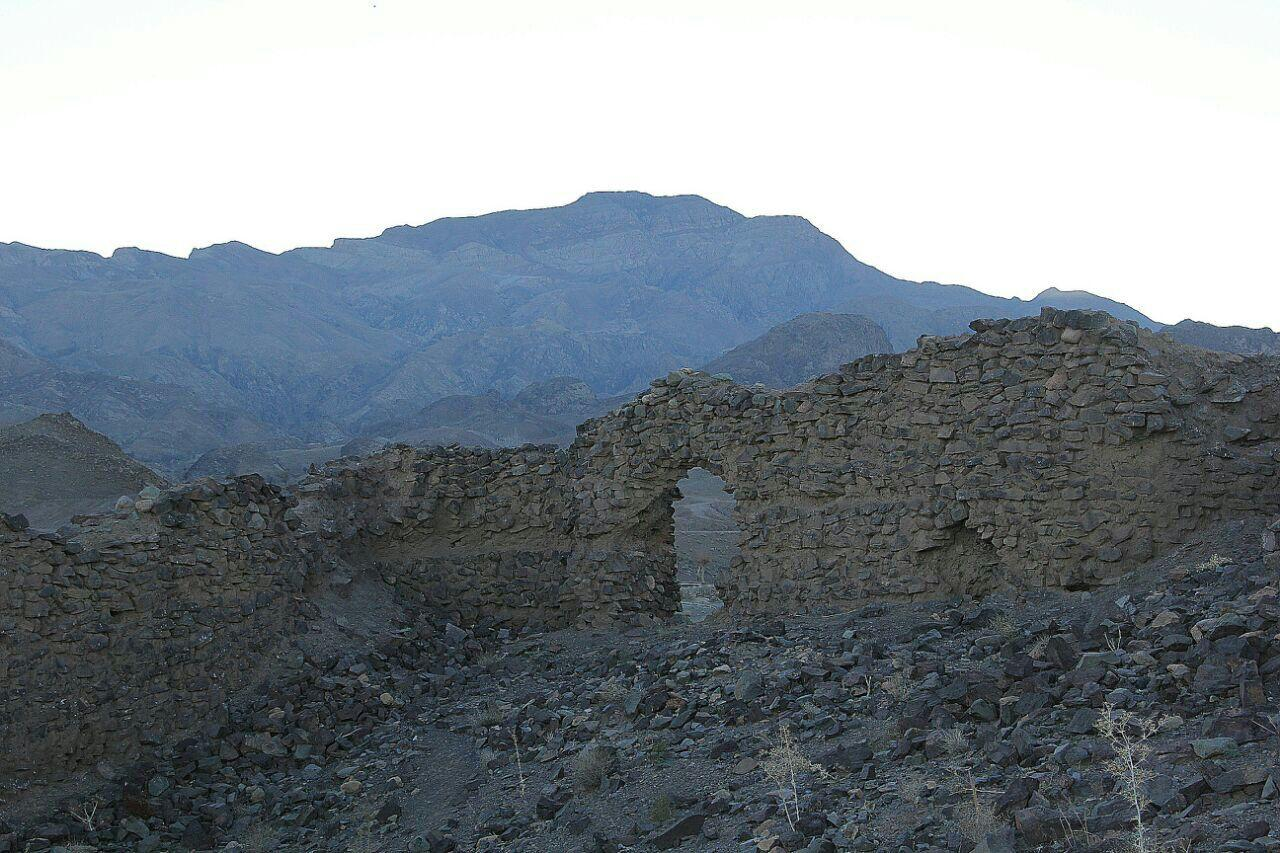
Zibad Castle قلعه زیبد

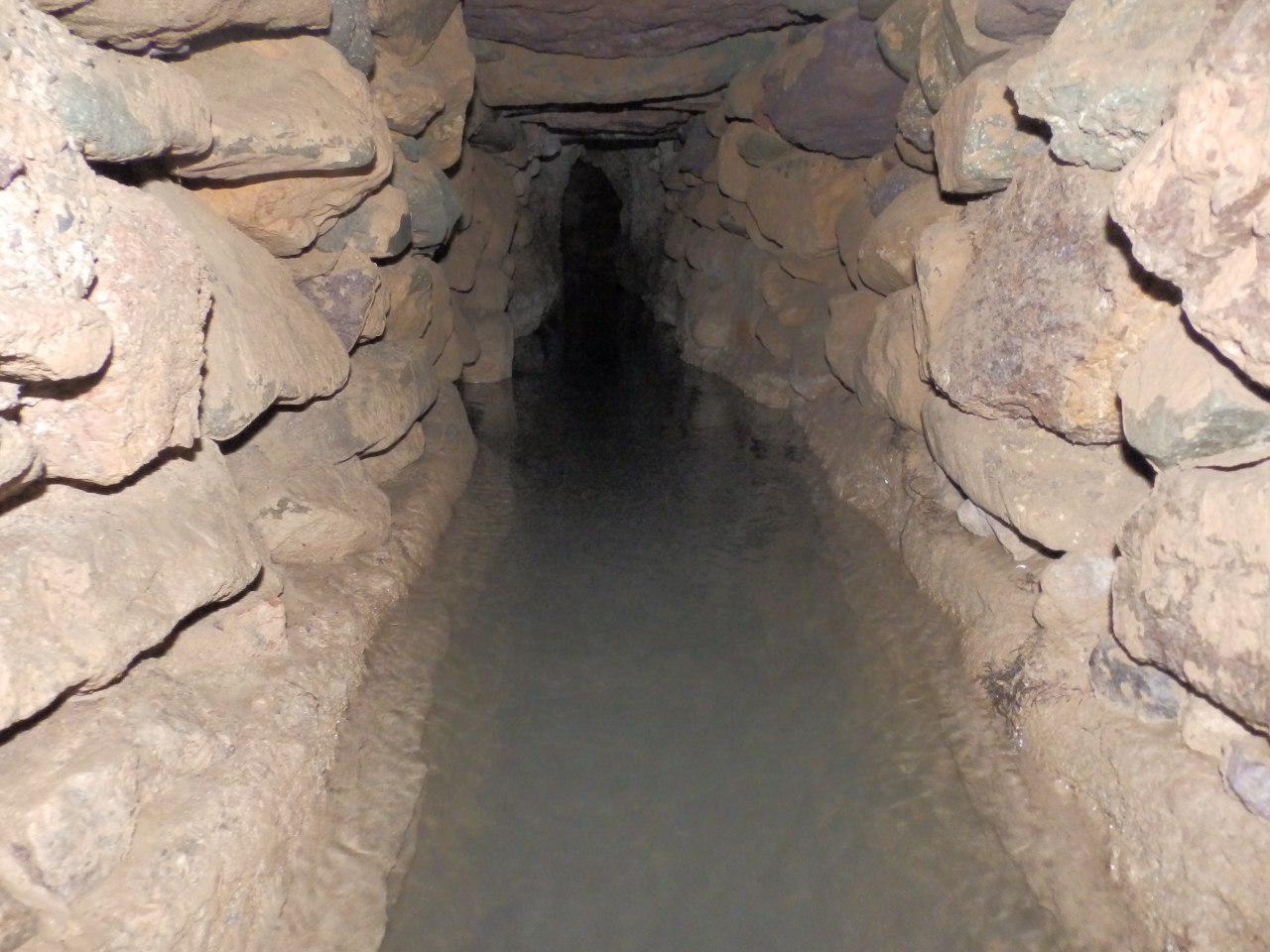
Kariz Zebad

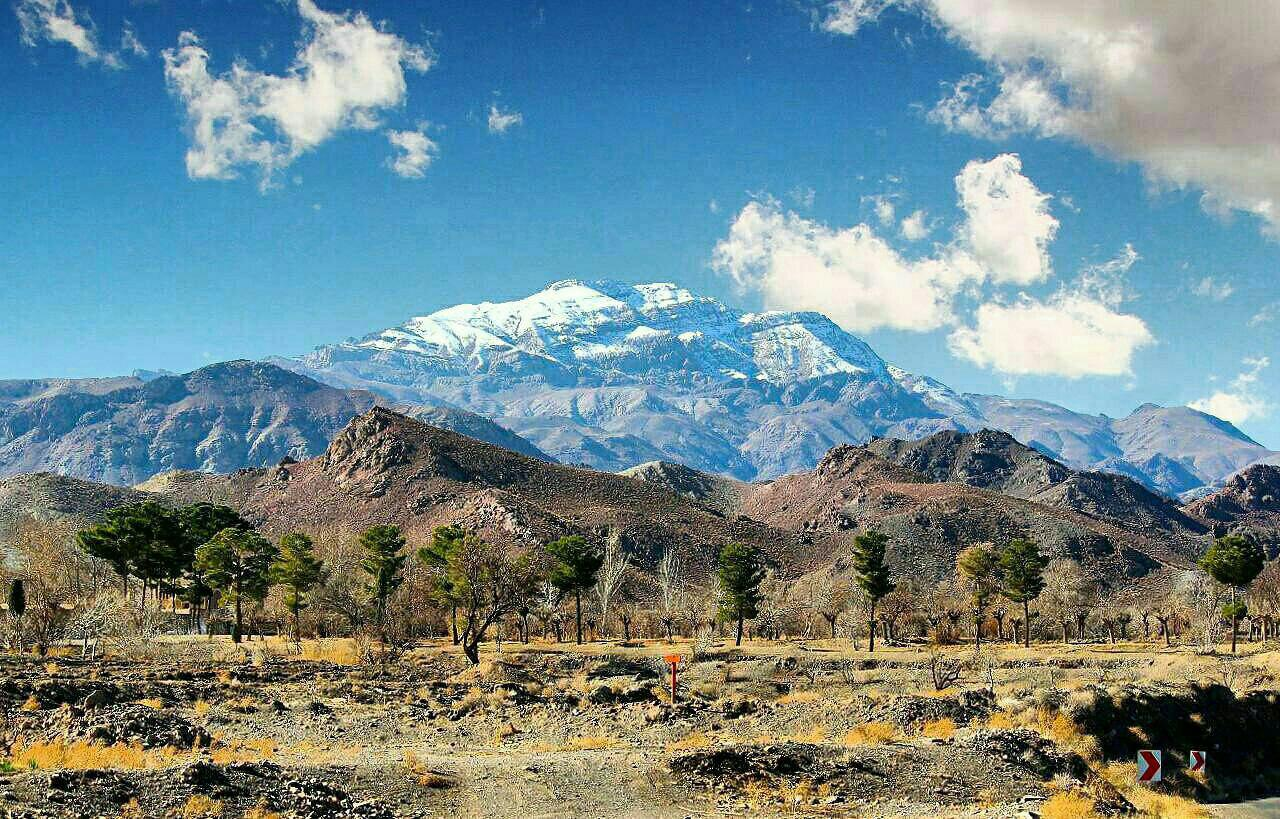
zibad Mountain

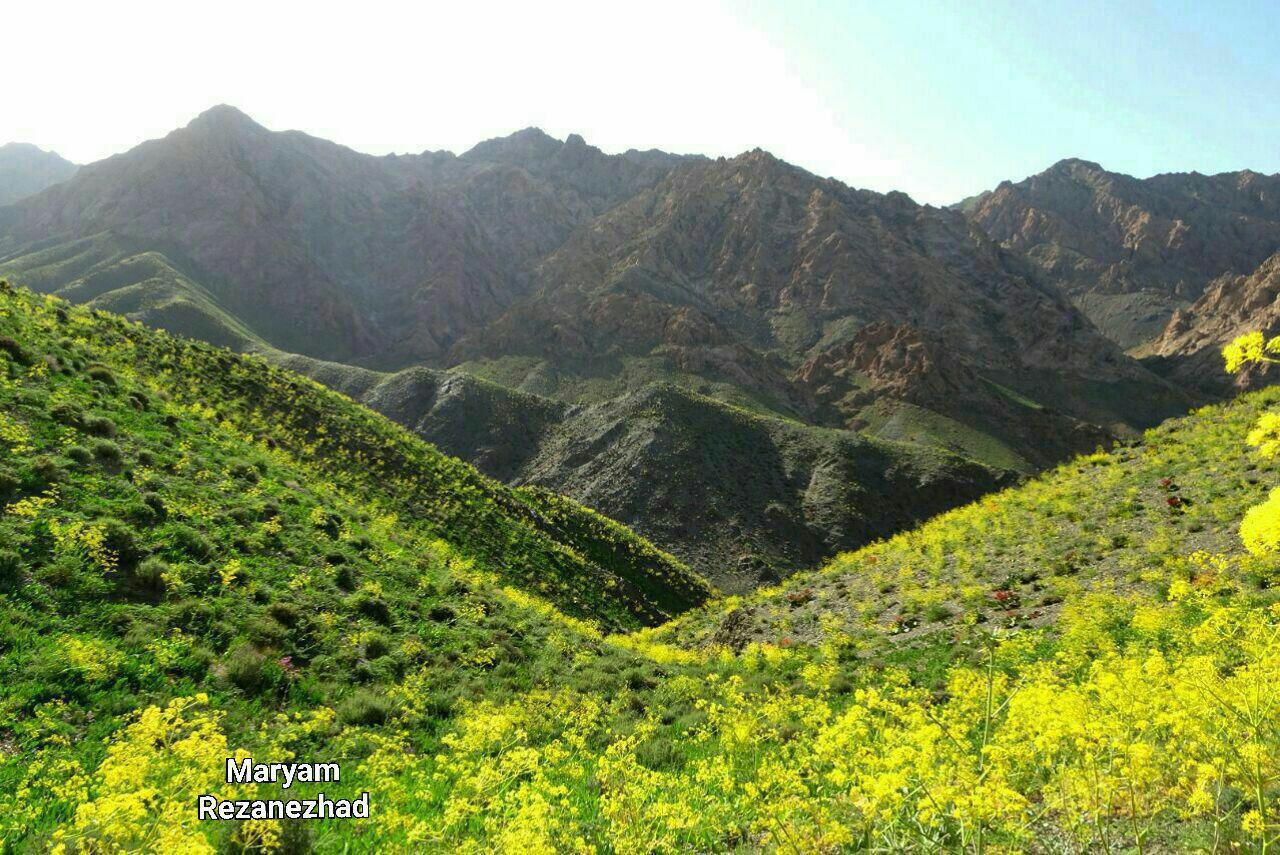
Ferula Zibad

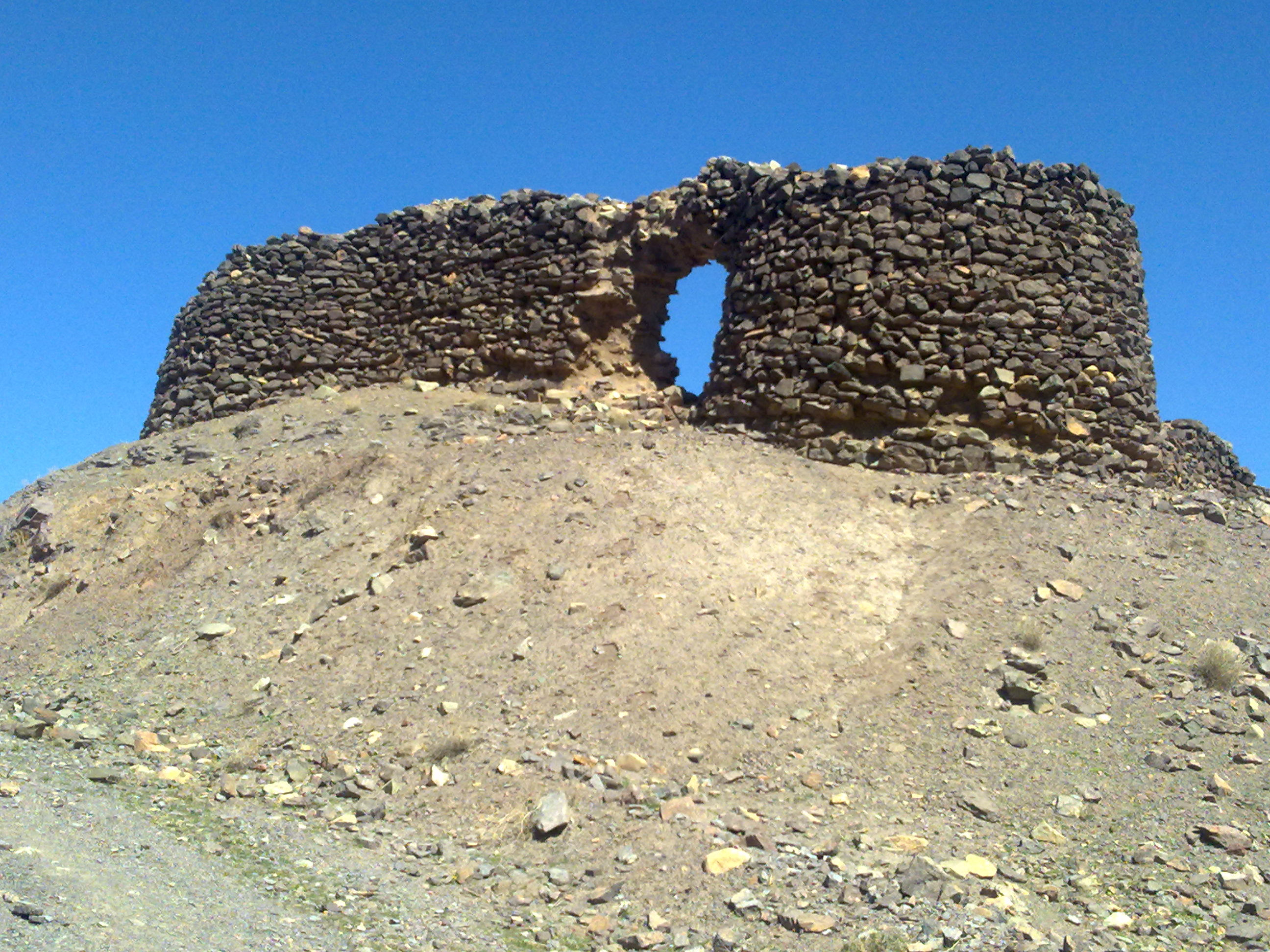
Sassanian Castel

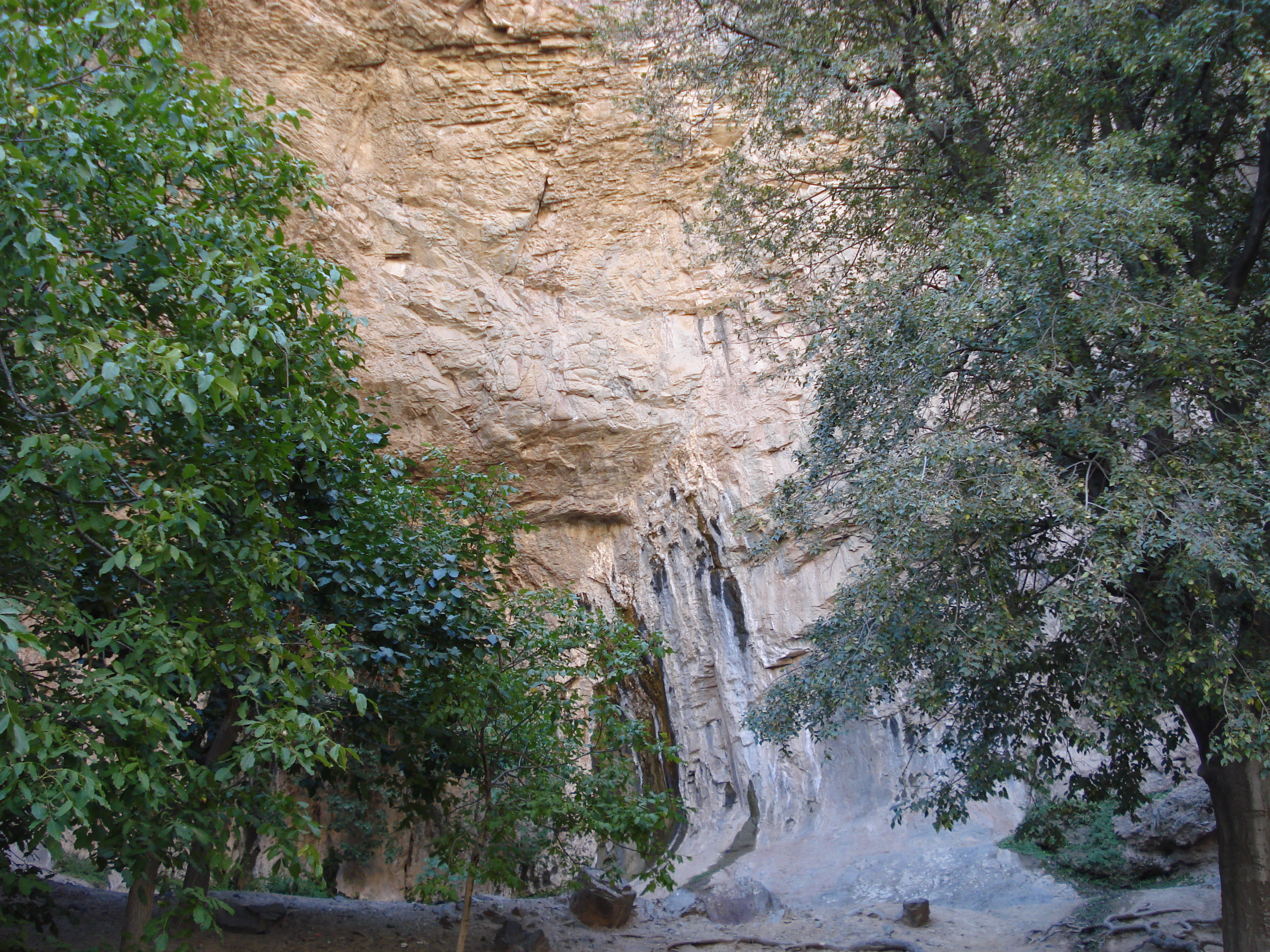
Soufe Zibad

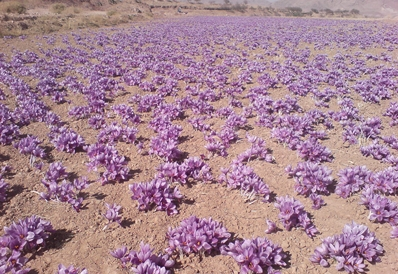

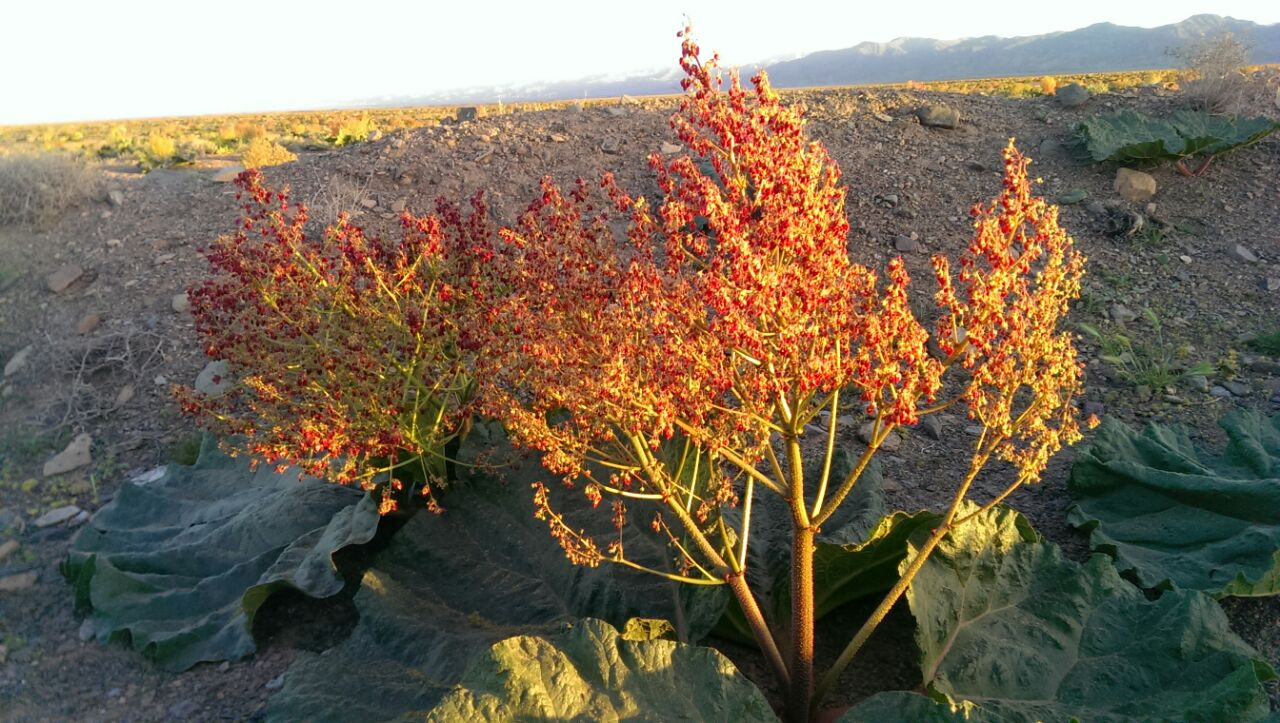
Rivas zibad

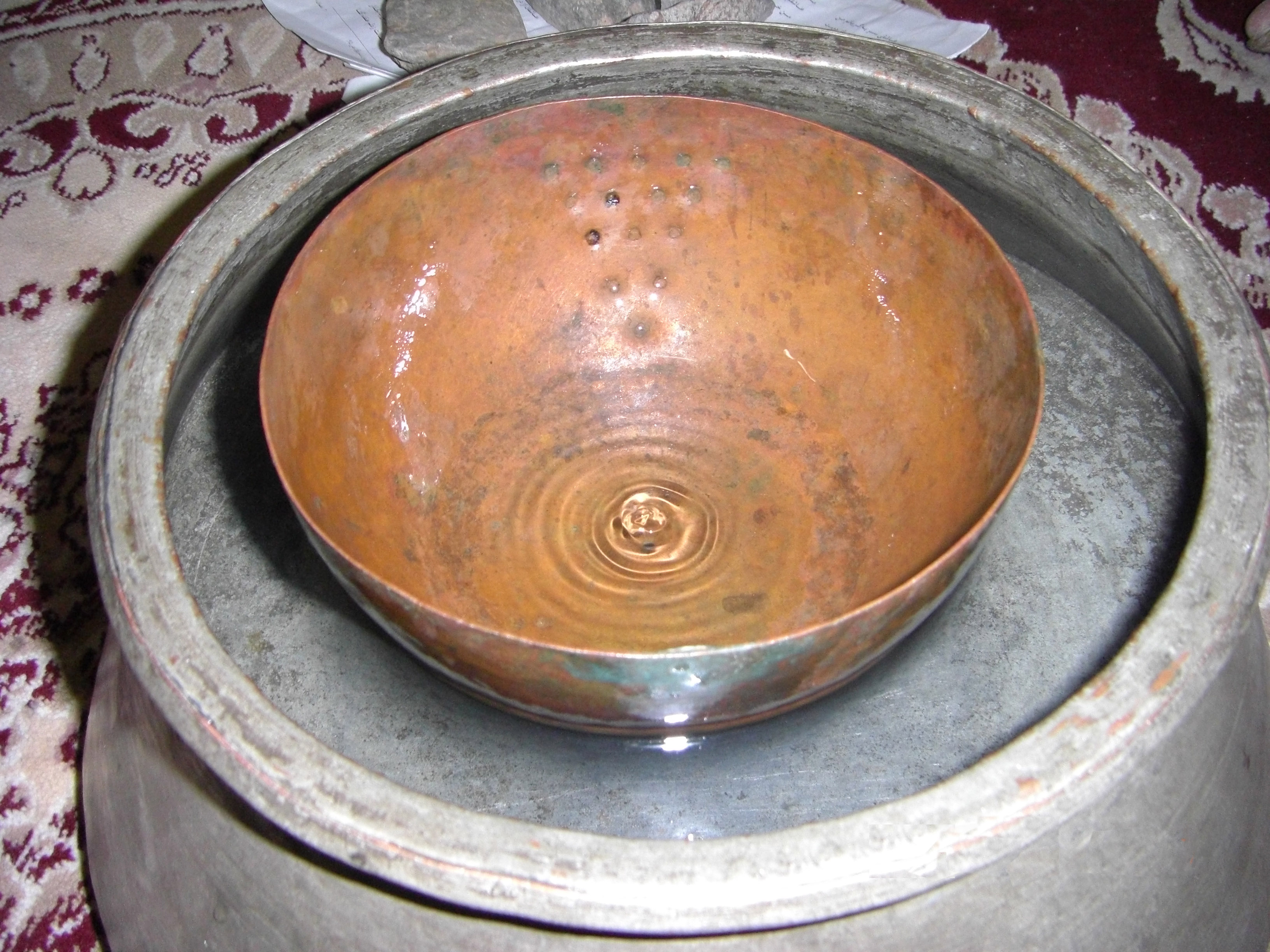
Ancient water clock used in qanat of gonabad 2500 years ago

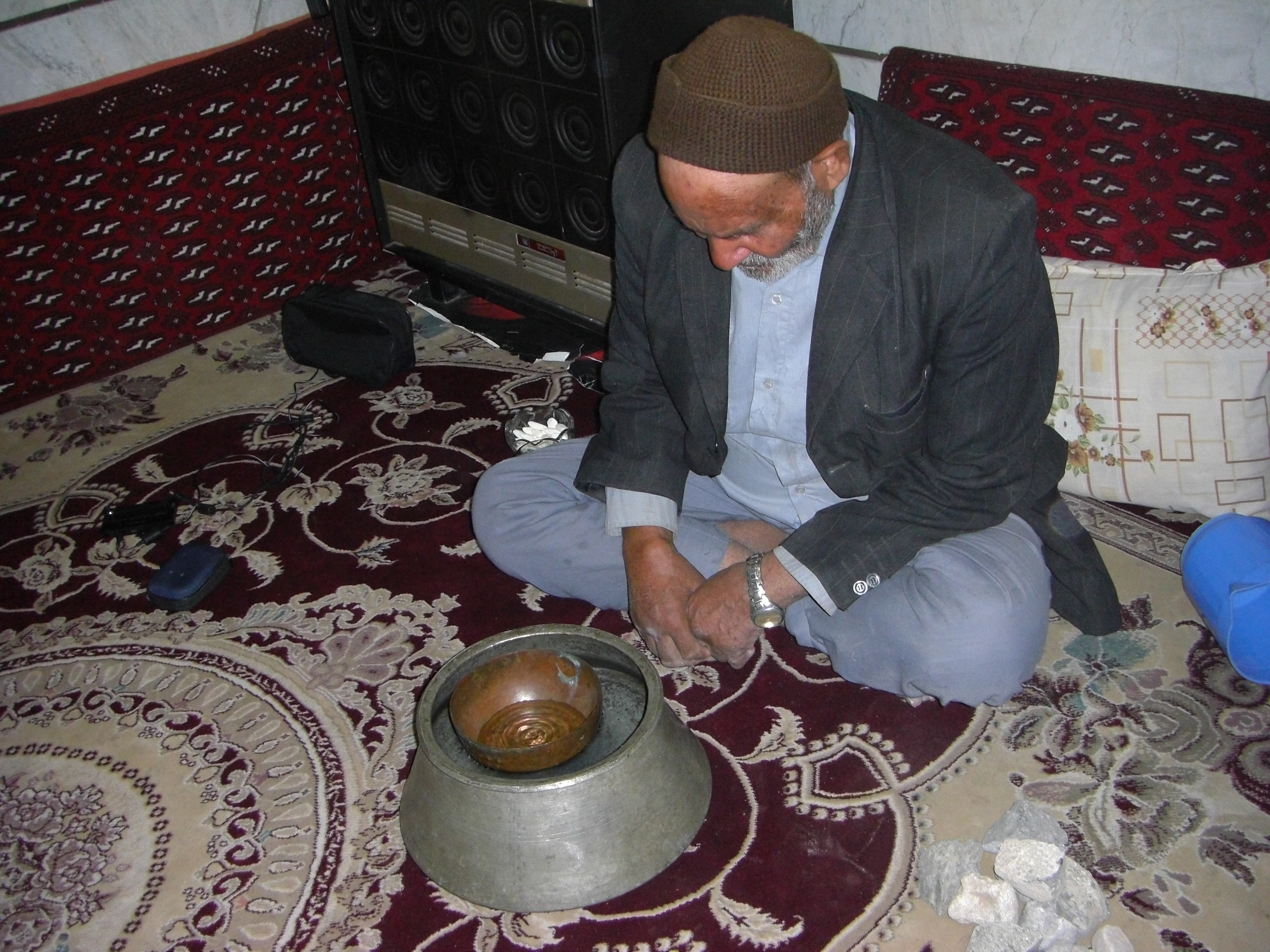
Reconstruction of the scene with a real manager of the water clock, Iran

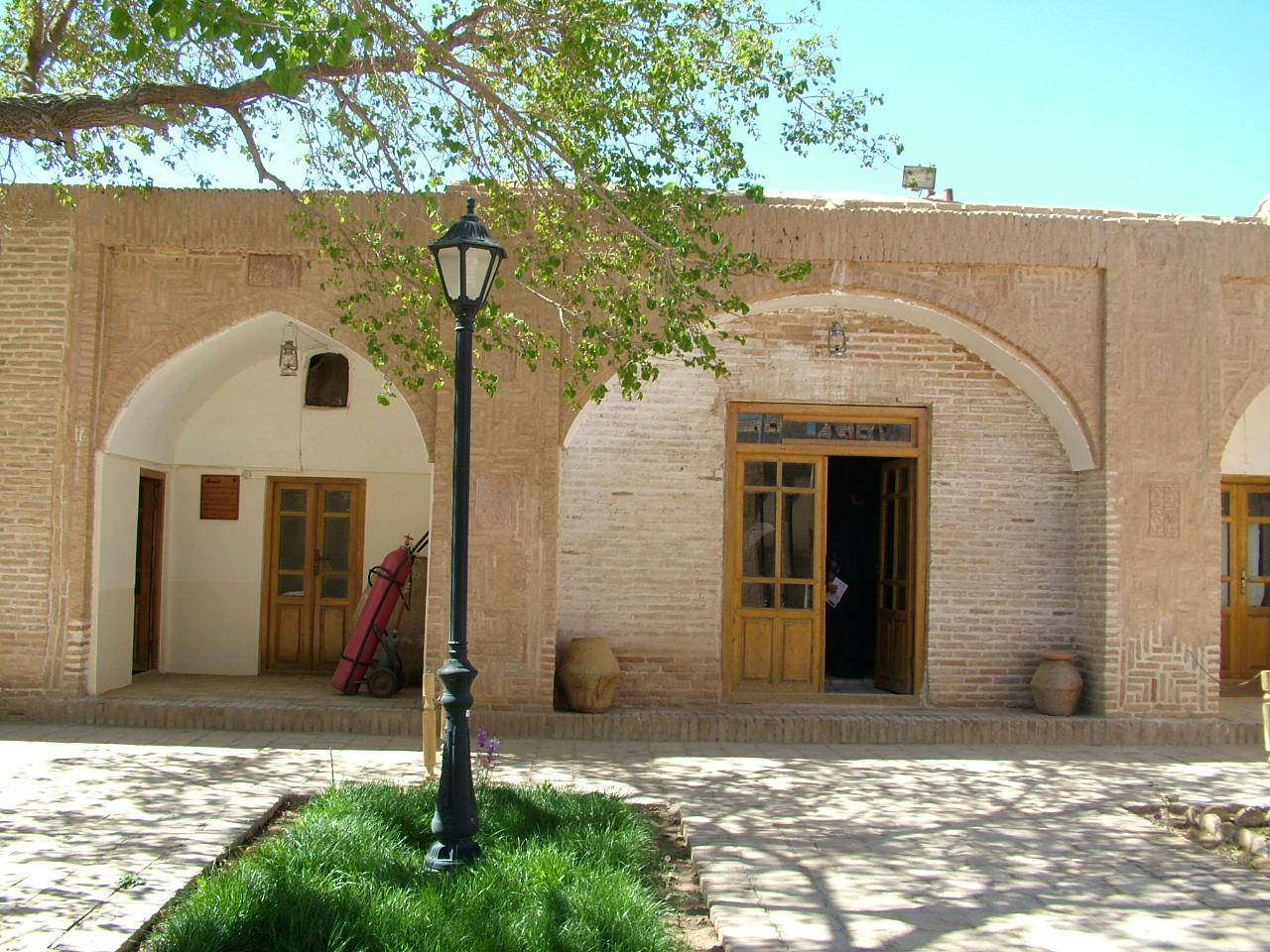

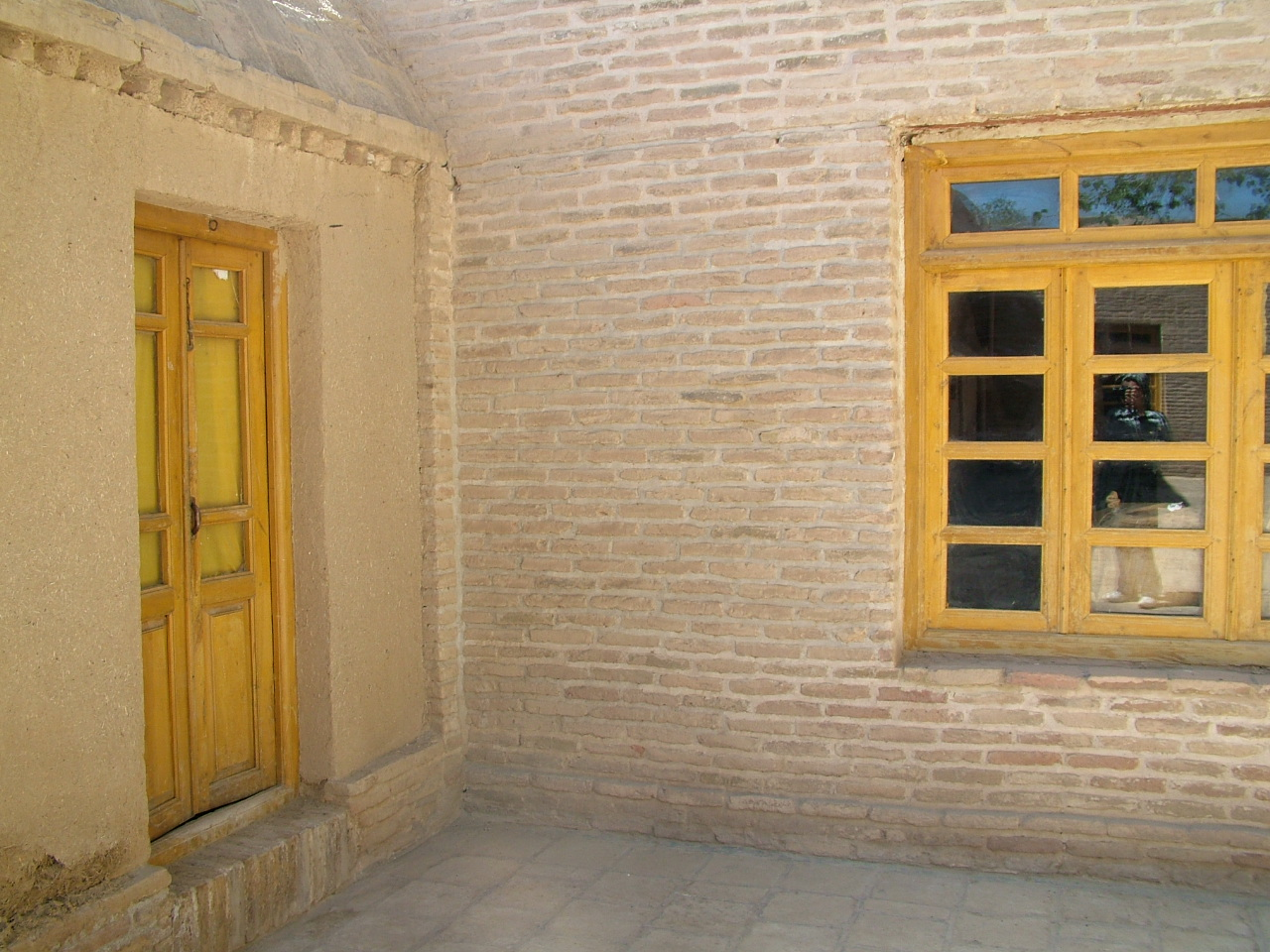

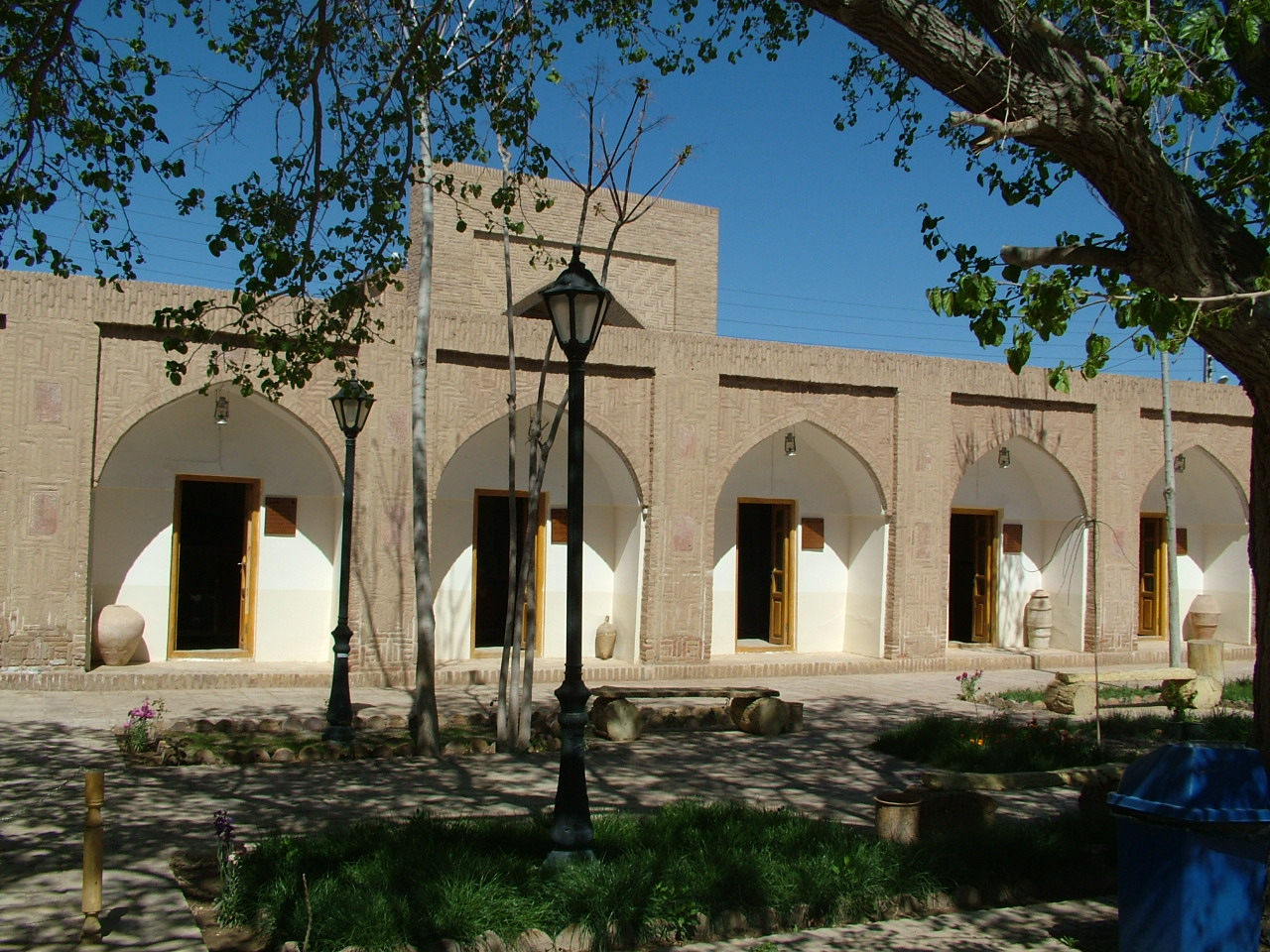

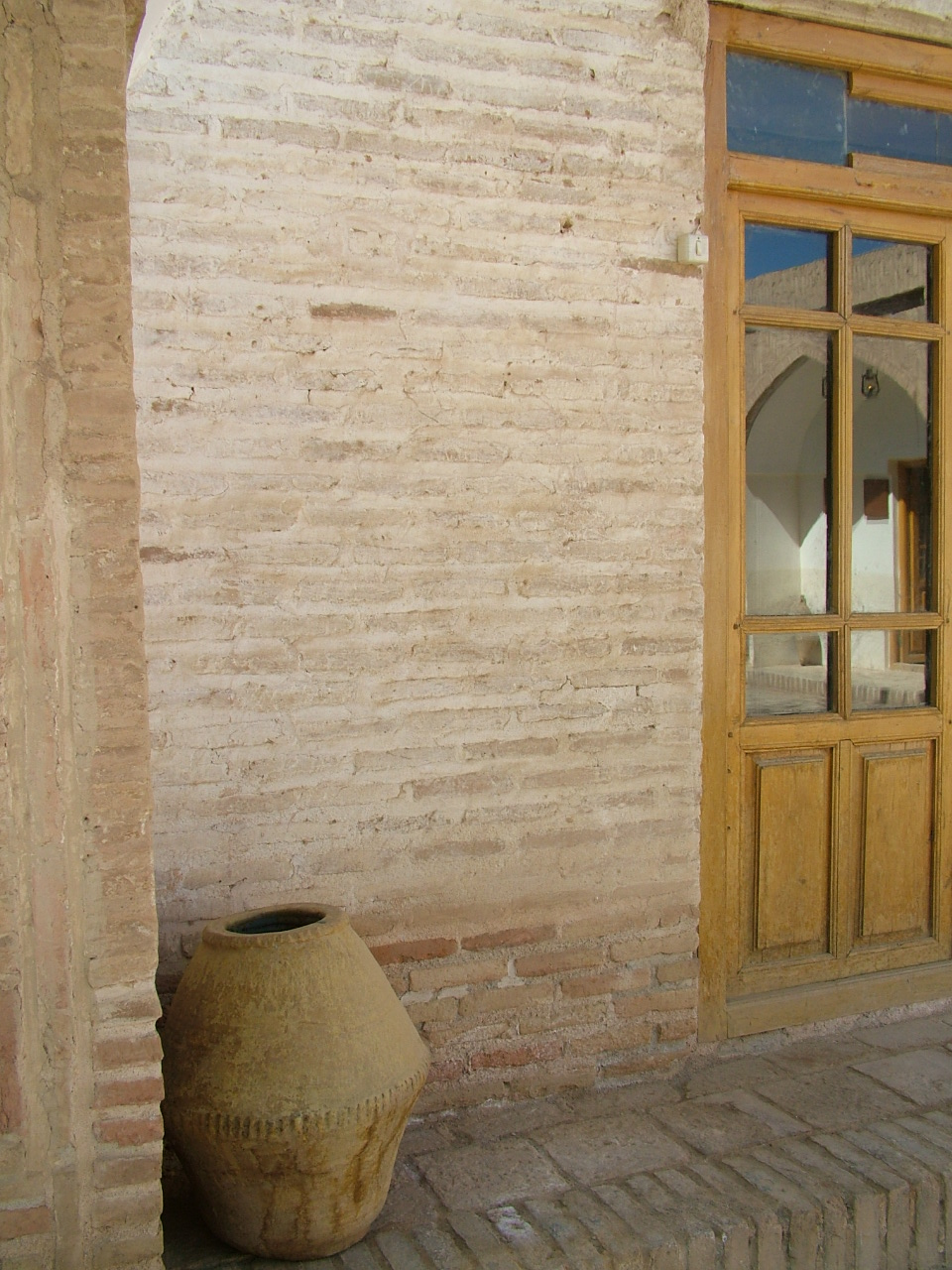

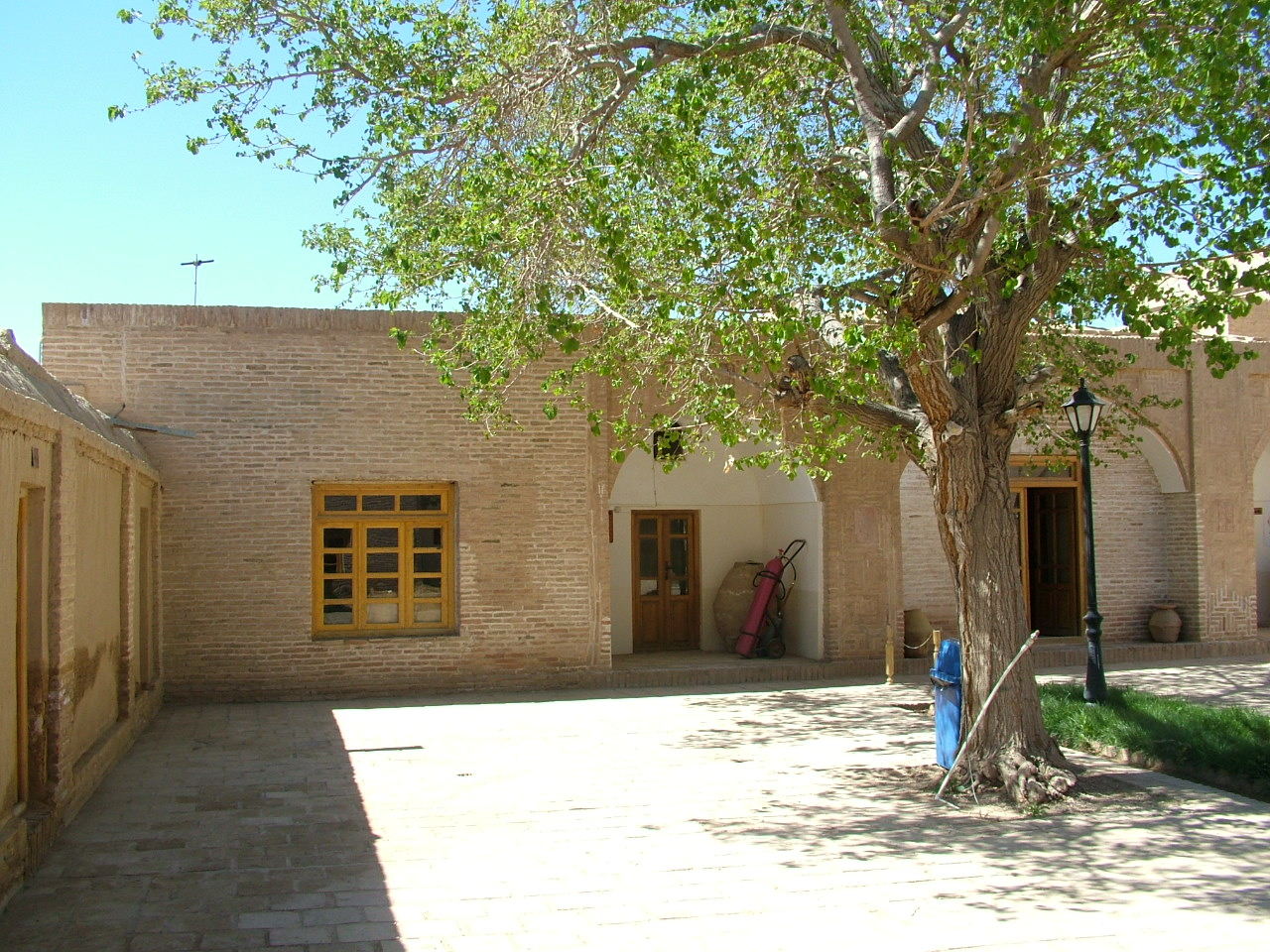

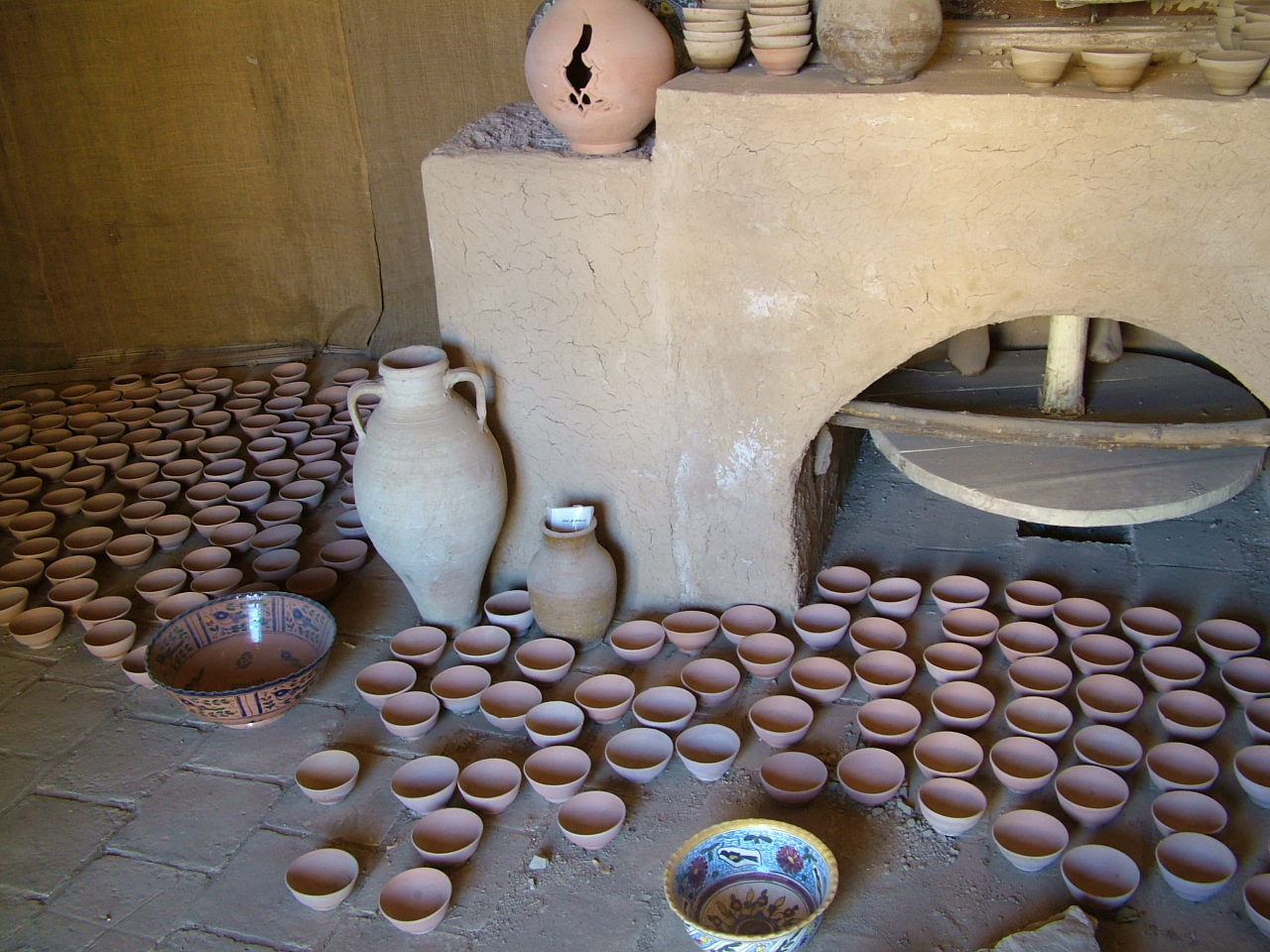

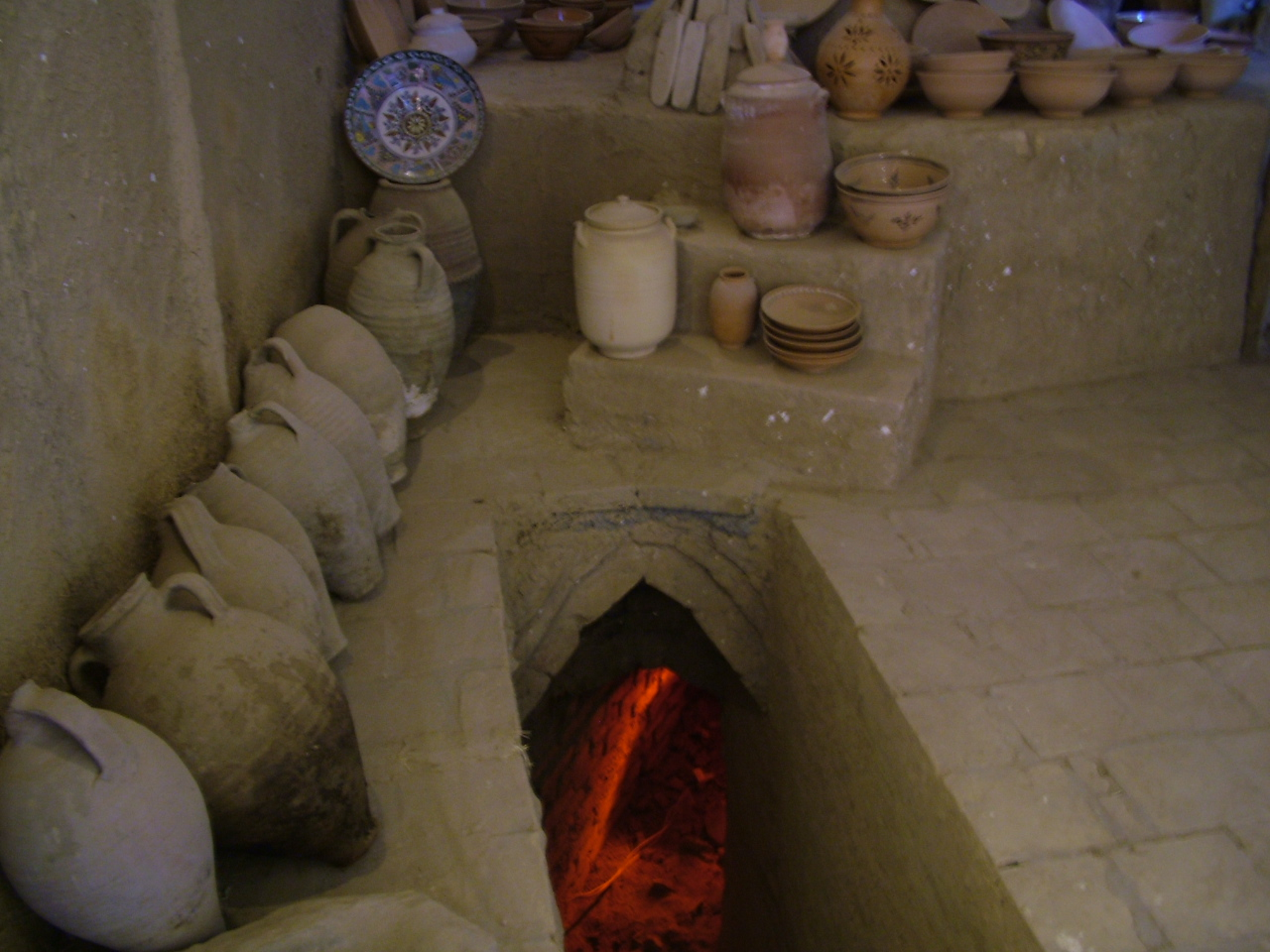

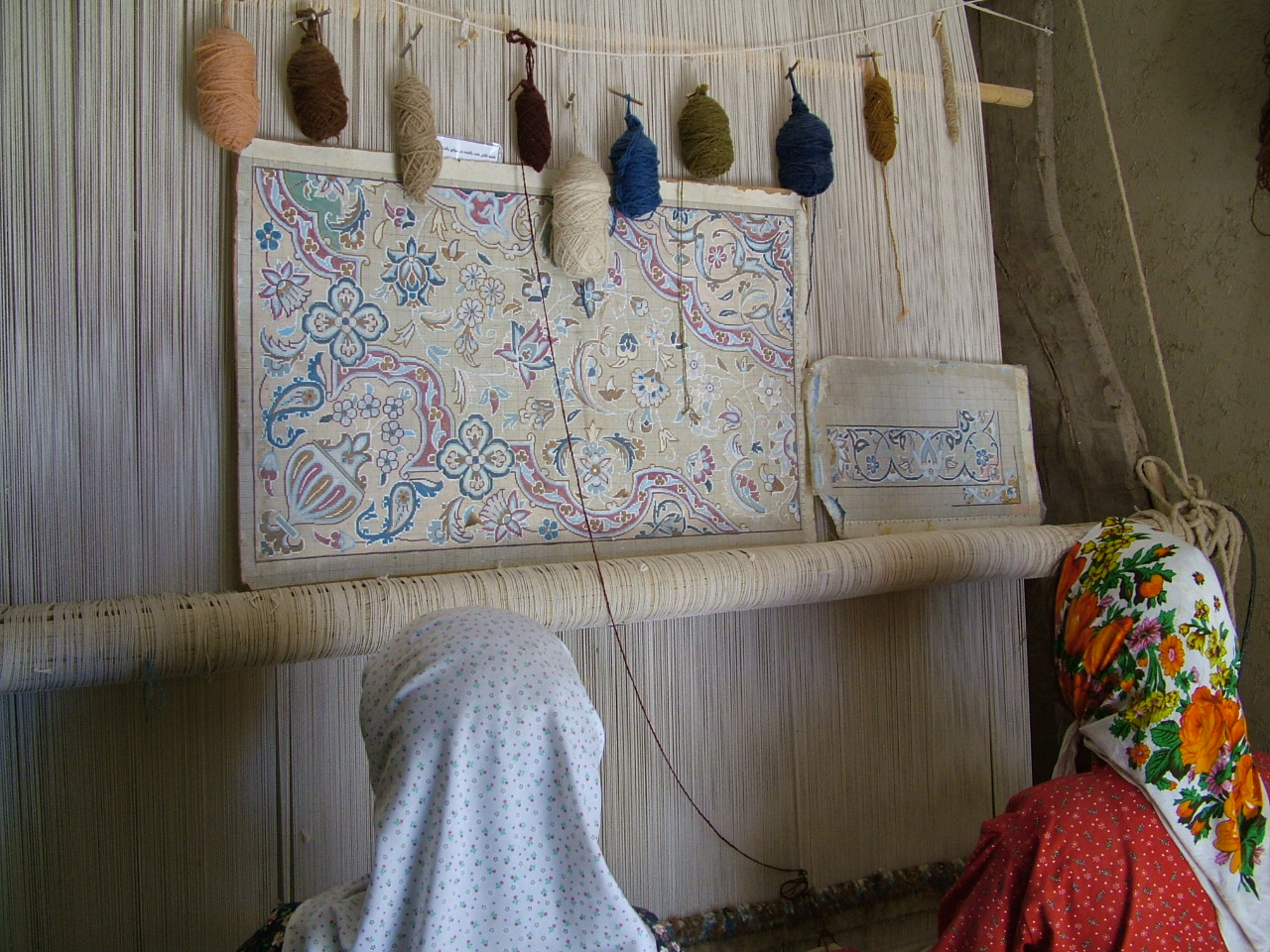

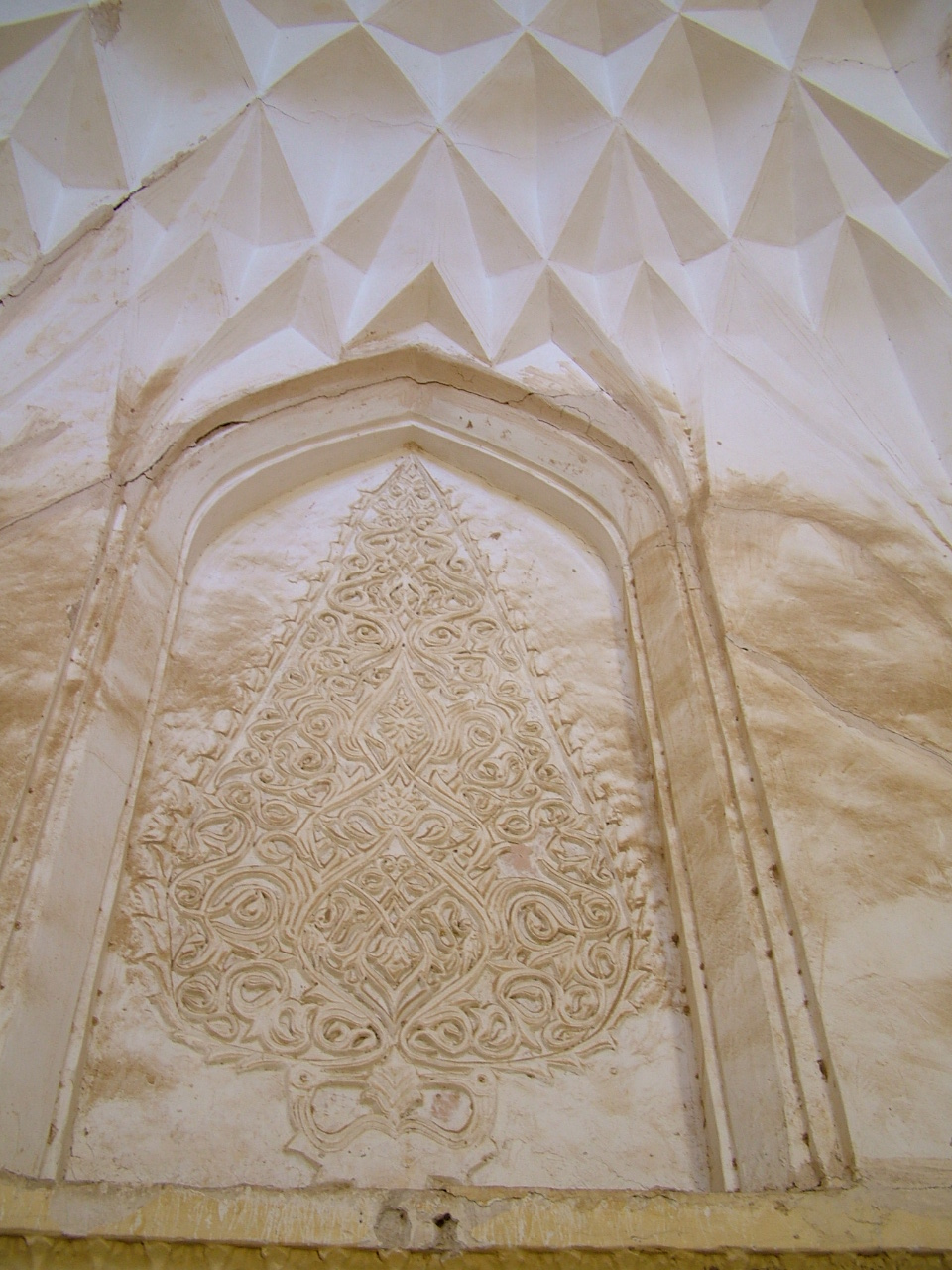

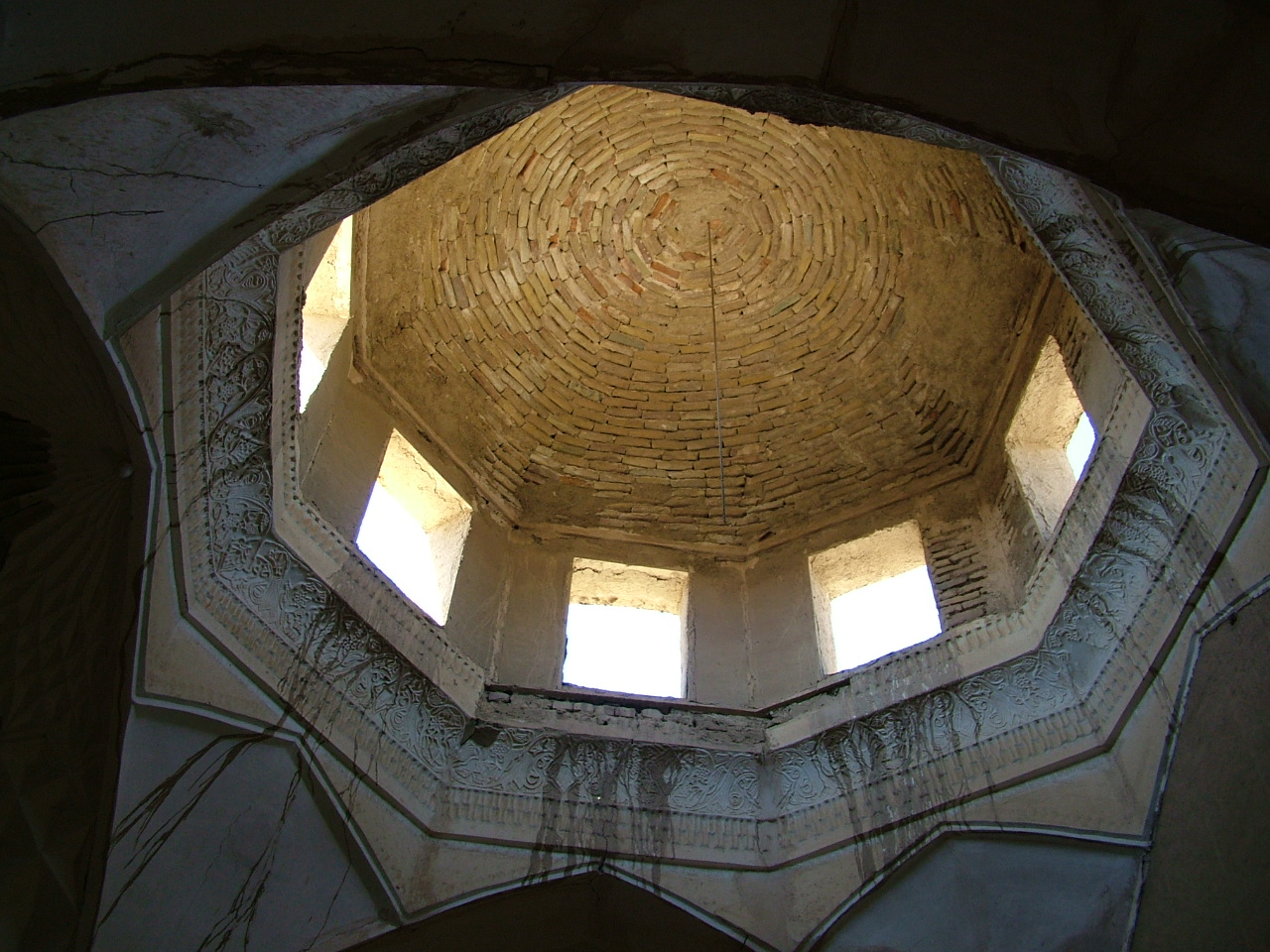

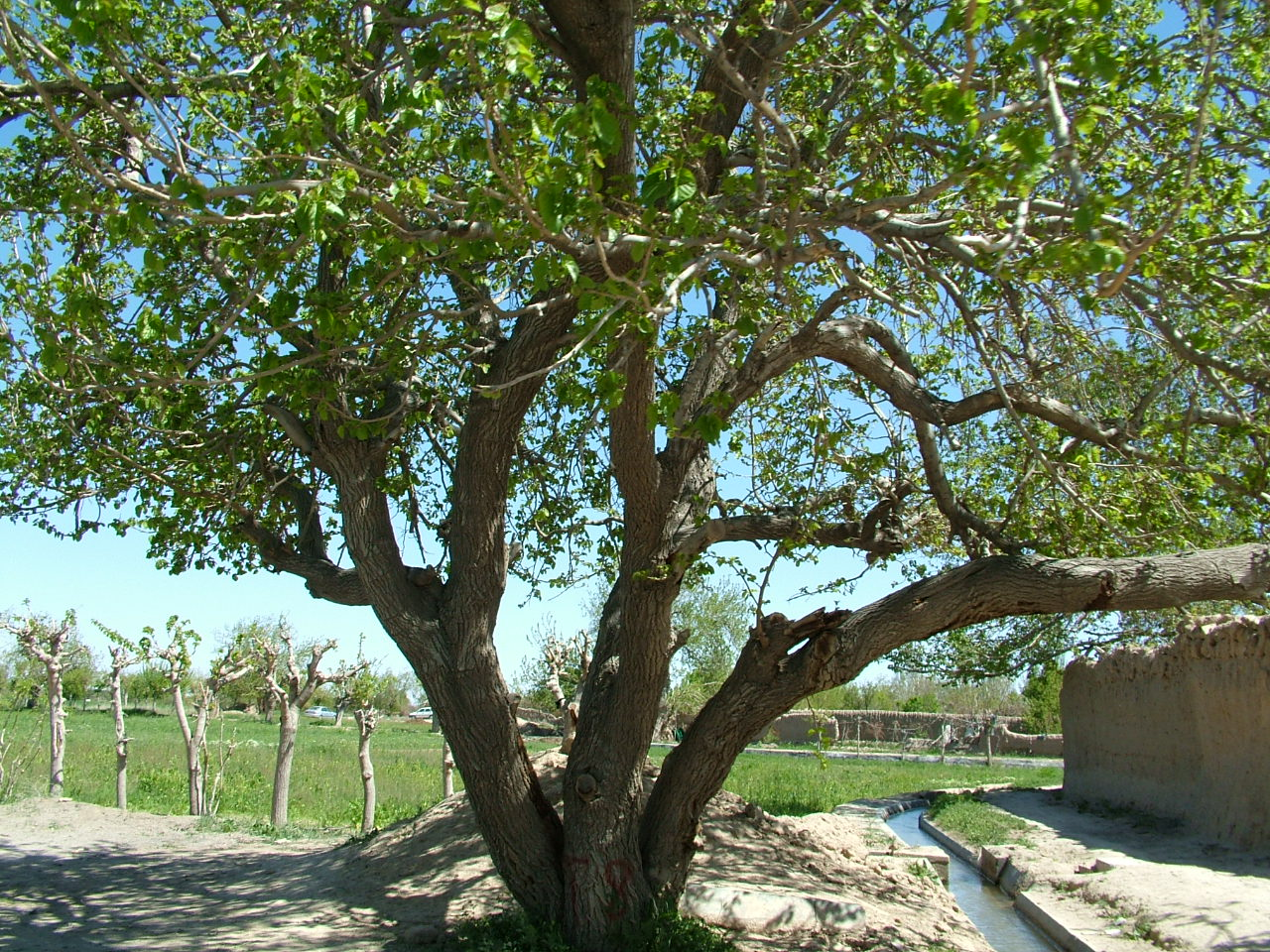

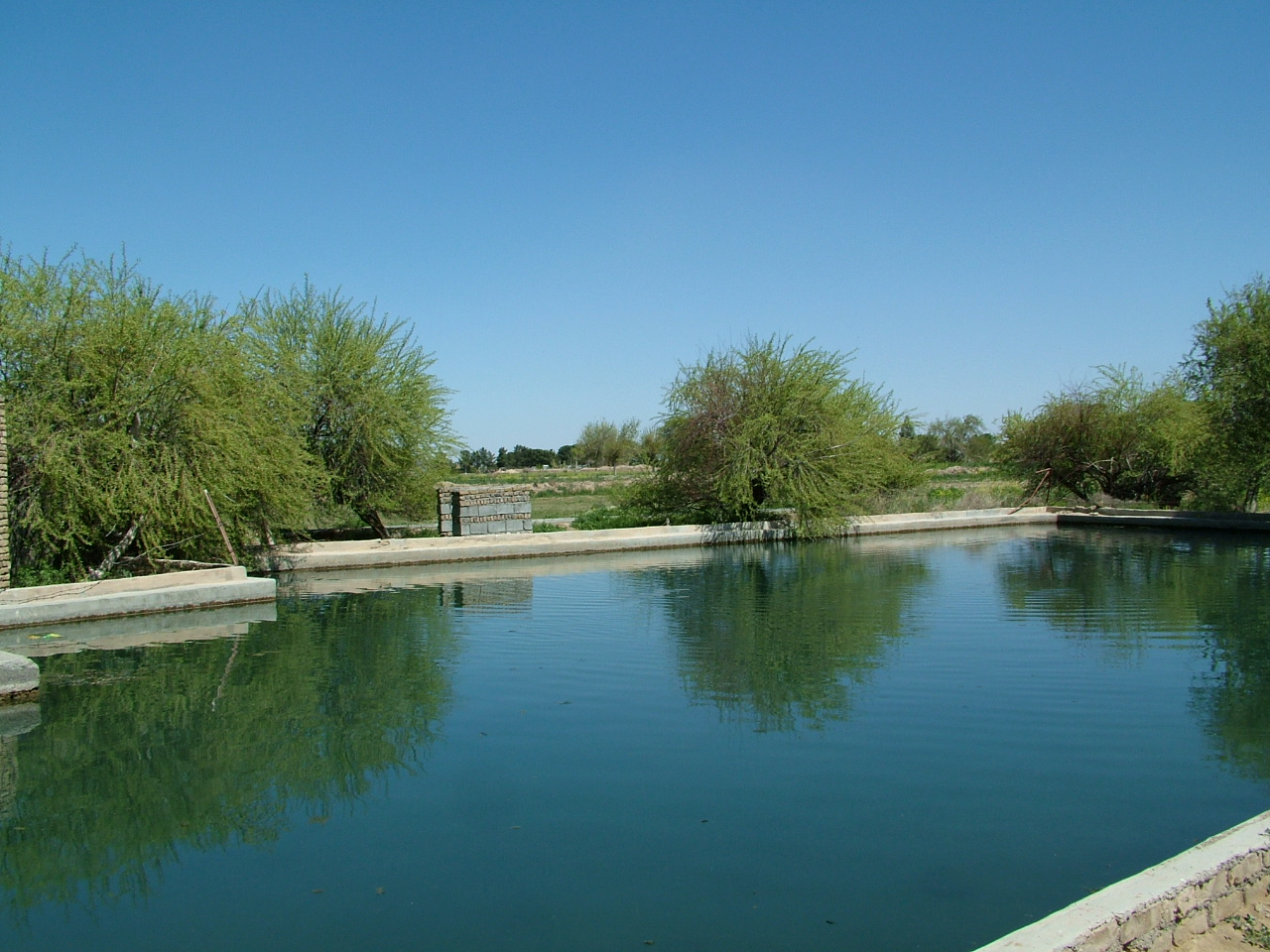

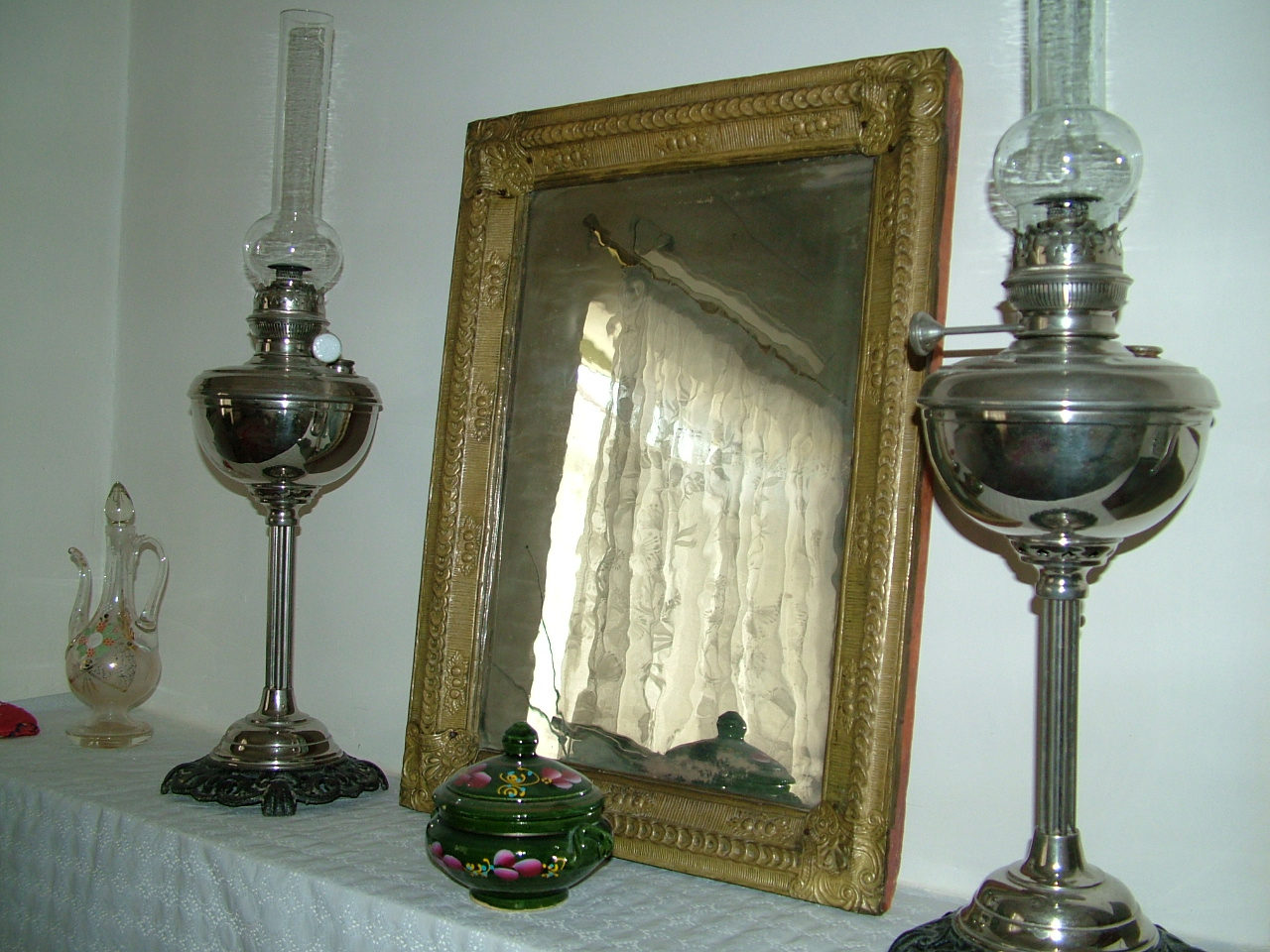
