= Kakhkuk =

Kakhkuk كاخكوك
- Village
- Location within Iran
- Coordinates: 32°26′09″N 59°02′29″E
- Country: Iran
- Province: South Khorasan
- County: Khusf
- Bakhsh: Jolgeh-e Mazhan
- Rural District: Jolgeh-e Mazhan

Population (2006)
  - Total: 12
- Time zone: UTC+3:30 (IRST)
  - Summer (DST): UTC+4:30 (IRDT)

Kakhkuk (Persian: كاخكوك, also Romanized as Kākhkūk; also known as Kākhūk, Kākhk, and Kuhkuk) is a village in Jolgeh-e Mazhan Rural District, Jolgeh-e Mazhan District, Khusf County, South Khorasan Province, Iran. At the 2006 census, its population was 12, in 4 families.
