= Kalateh-ye Now, Zirkuh =

Kalateh-ye Now كلاته نو
- Village
- Location within Iran
- Coordinates: 33°35′05″N 59°56′03″E
- Country: Iran
- Province: South Khorasan
- County: Zirkuh
- Bakhsh: Central
- Rural District: Zirkuh

Population (2006)
  - Total: 93
- Time zone: UTC+3:30 (IRST)
  - Summer (DST): UTC+4:30 (IRDT)

Kalateh-ye Now (Persian: كلاته نو, also Romanized as Kalāteh-ye Now, Kalāteh Nau, and Kalāteh Now; also known as Kūh-e Now) is a village in Zirkuh Rural District, Central District, Zirkuh County, South Khorasan Province, Iran. At the 2006 census, its population was 93, in 23 families.
