= Marghesh, Mashhad =

Marghesh مرغش
- Village
- Location within Iran
- Coordinates: 36°16′26″N 59°45′59″E
- Country: Iran
- Province: Razavi Khorasan
- County: Mashhad
- Bakhsh: Central
- Rural District: Kenevist

Population (2006)
  - Total: 16
- Time zone: UTC+3:30 (IRST)
  - Summer (DST): UTC+4:30 (IRDT)

Marghesh (Persian: مرغش, also Romanized as Marghash) is a village in Kenevist Rural District, in the Central District of Mashhad County, Razavi Khorasan Province, Iran. At the 2006 census, its population was 16, in 5 families.
