= Kalateh-ye Now, Birjand =

Kalateh-ye Now كلاته نو
- Village
- Location within Iran
- Coordinates: 33°02′55″N 59°16′48″E
- Country: Iran
- Province: South Khorasan
- County: Birjand
- Bakhsh: Central
- Rural District: Alqurat

Population (2006)
  - Total: 36
- Time zone: UTC+3:30 (IRST)
  - Summer (DST): UTC+4:30 (IRDT)

Kalateh-ye Now (Persian: كلاته نو, also Romanized as Kalāteh-ye Now, Kalāteh-i-Nau, and Kalāteh Now; also known as Now) is a village in Alqurat Rural District, in the Central District of Birjand County, South Khorasan Province, Iran. At the 2006 census, its population was 36, in 12 families.
