= Kakhk =

City in Razavi Khorasan province, Iran

Kakhk Persian: کاخْک
- City
- Location within Iran
- Coordinates: 34°08′53″N 58°38′44″E
- Country: Iran
- Province: Razavi Khorasan
- County: Gonabad
- District: Kakhk

Population (2016)
  - Total: 4,625
- Time zone: UTC+3:30 (IRST)

Kakhk (Persian: کاخْک) (Note: Also romanized as Kākhak and Kākhk; also known as Kākh) is a city in, and the capital of, Kakhk District in Gonabad County, Razavi Khorasan province, Iran.

== Demographics ==
=== Population ===
At the time of the 2006 National Census, the city's population was 4,015 in 1,252 households. The following census in 2011 counted 4,413 people in 1,338 households. The 2016 census measured the population of the city as 4,625 people in 1,549 households.

== Geography and climate ==
The city is classified as having a steppe climate with medium latitude at an altitude of 1483.26 meters above sea level. The annual temperature of the region is 17.42 degrees Celsius and 1.01% lower than the average temperature of Iran. Kakhk normally receives about 26.86 mm of rain and has 51.34 rainy days annually.
