= Kalateh-ye Now, Darmian =

Kalateh-ye Now كلاته نو
- Village
- Location within Iran
- Coordinates: 32°45′54″N 59°57′41″E
- Country: Iran
- Province: South Khorasan
- County: Darmian
- Bakhsh: Central
- Rural District: Darmian

Population (2006)
  - Total: 12
- Time zone: UTC+3:30 (IRST)
  - Summer (DST): UTC+4:30 (IRDT)

Kalateh-ye Now (Persian: كلاته نو, also Romanized as Kalāteh-ye Now, Kalāteh-i-Nau, and Kalateh Now; also known as Kalāt-e Now) is a village in Darmian Rural District, in the Central District of Darmian County, South Khorasan Province, Iran. At the 2006 census, its population was 12, in 4 families.
