= Kakhk Rural District =

Rural district in Razavi Khorasan province, Iran

Kakhk Rural District Persian: دهستان كاخك
- Rural District
- Location within Iran
- Coordinates: 34°09′N 58°44′E
- Country: Iran
- Province: Razavi Khorasan
- County: Gonabad
- District: Kakhk
- Established: 1987
- Capital: Marghesh

Population (2016)
  - Total: 2,809
- Time zone: UTC+3:30 (IRST)

Kakhk Rural District (Persian: دهستان كاخك) is in Kakhk District of Gonabad County, Razavi Khorasan province, Iran. Its capital is the village of Marghesh.

== Demographics ==
=== Population ===
At the time of the 2006 National Census, the rural district's population was 3,052 in 1,118 households. There were 2,354 inhabitants in 974 households at the following census of 2011. The 2016 census measured the population of the rural district as 2,809 in 1,140 households. The most populous of its 172 villages was Ostad, with 407 people.

=== Other villages in the rural district ===
- Disfan
- Kabutarkuh
- Kalateh-ye Now
- Khanik
- Najmabad
- Pochak
