= Kakhk District =

District in Razavi Khorasan province, Iran

Kakhk District Persian: بخش کاخک
- District
- Location within Iran
- Coordinates: 34°15′N 58°34′E
- Country: Iran
- Province: Razavi Khorasan
- County: Gonabad
- Established: 1996
- Capital: Kakhk

Population (2016)
  - Total: 12,326
- Time zone: UTC+3:30 (IRST)

Kakhk District (Persian: بخش کاخک) is in Gonabad County, Razavi Khorasan province, Iran. Its capital is the city of Kakhk.

== Demographics ==
=== Population ===
At the time of the 2006 National Census, the district's population was 11,814 in 4,091 households. The following census in 2011 counted 11,010 people in 4,013 households. The 2016 census measured the population of the district as 12,326 inhabitants in 4,630 households.

=== Administrative divisions ===
Kakhk District Population
Administrative Divisions	2006	2011	2016
Kakhk RD	3,052	2,354	2,809
Zibad RD	4,747	4,243	4,892
Kakhk (city)	4,015	4,413	4,625
Total	11,814	11,010	12,326
RD = Rural District
