= Gonabad County =

County in Razavi Khorasan province, Iran

Gonabad County Persian: شهرستان گناباد
- County
- Location of Gonabad County in Razavi Khorasan province (bottom, pink)

- Location of Razavi Khorasan province in Iran
- Coordinates: 34°26′N 58°52′E
- Country: Iran
- Province: Razavi Khorasan
- Capital: Gonabad
- Districts: Central, Kakhk

Area
  - Total: 5,789 km^{2} (2,235 sq mi)
- Elevation: 1,105 m (3,625 ft)

Population (2016)
  - Total: 88,753
  - Density: 15.33/km^{2} (39.71/sq mi)
- Time zone: UTC+3:30 (IRST)

Gonabad County (Persian: شهرستان گناباد) is in Razavi Khorasan province, Iran. Its capital is the city of Gonabad.

== History ==
In 2007, Bajestan District was separated from the county in the establishment of Bajestan County. The village of Rushnavand was converted to a city in 2020.

== Demographics ==
=== Population ===
At the time of the 2006 National Census, the county's population was 106,158, in 30,357 households. The following census in 2011 counted 80,783 people in 24,292 households. The 2016 census measured the population of the county as 88,753 in 27,607 households.

=== Administrative divisions ===
Gonabad County's population history and administrative structure over three consecutive censuses are shown in the following table.

Gonabad County Population
Administrative Divisions	2006	2011	2016
Central District	64,849	69,773	76,427
Howmeh RD	16,701	18,727	20,989
Pas Kalut RD	8,762	9,331	9,164
Bidokht (city)	4,823	5,348	5,501
Gonabad (city)	34,563	36,367	40,773
Rushnavand (city) (Note: Became a city after the 2016 census)			
Bajestan District (Note: Transferred to Bajestan County)	29,495		
Bajestan RD	3,382		
Jazin RD	5,294		
Yunesi RD	6,334		
Bajestan (city)	11,136		
Yunesi (city)	3,349		
Kakhk District	11,814	11,010	12,326
Kakhk RD	3,052	2,354	2,809
Zibad RD	4,747	4,243	4,892
Kakhk (city)	4,015	4,413	4,625
Total	106,158	80,783	88,753
RD = Rural District

== Geography ==
Gonabad is in a plate area on the north of the Brakoh mountain or Kūh-e Tīr Māhī

== Historical places ==
- Bidokht
- Kakhk
- Kūh-e Tīr Māhī
- Qanats of Gonabad
- Zibad

== Gallery ==
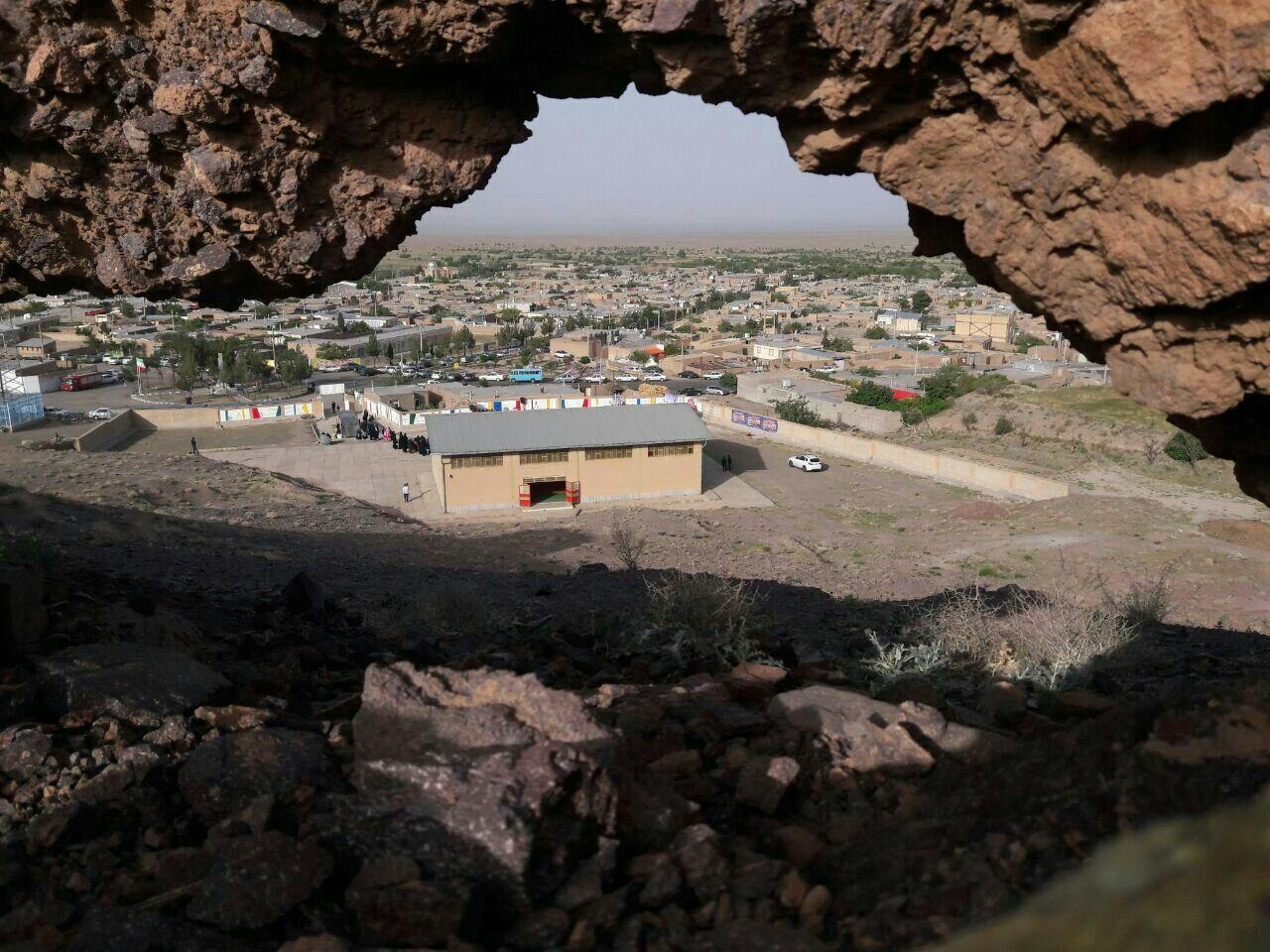
Zibad Castle

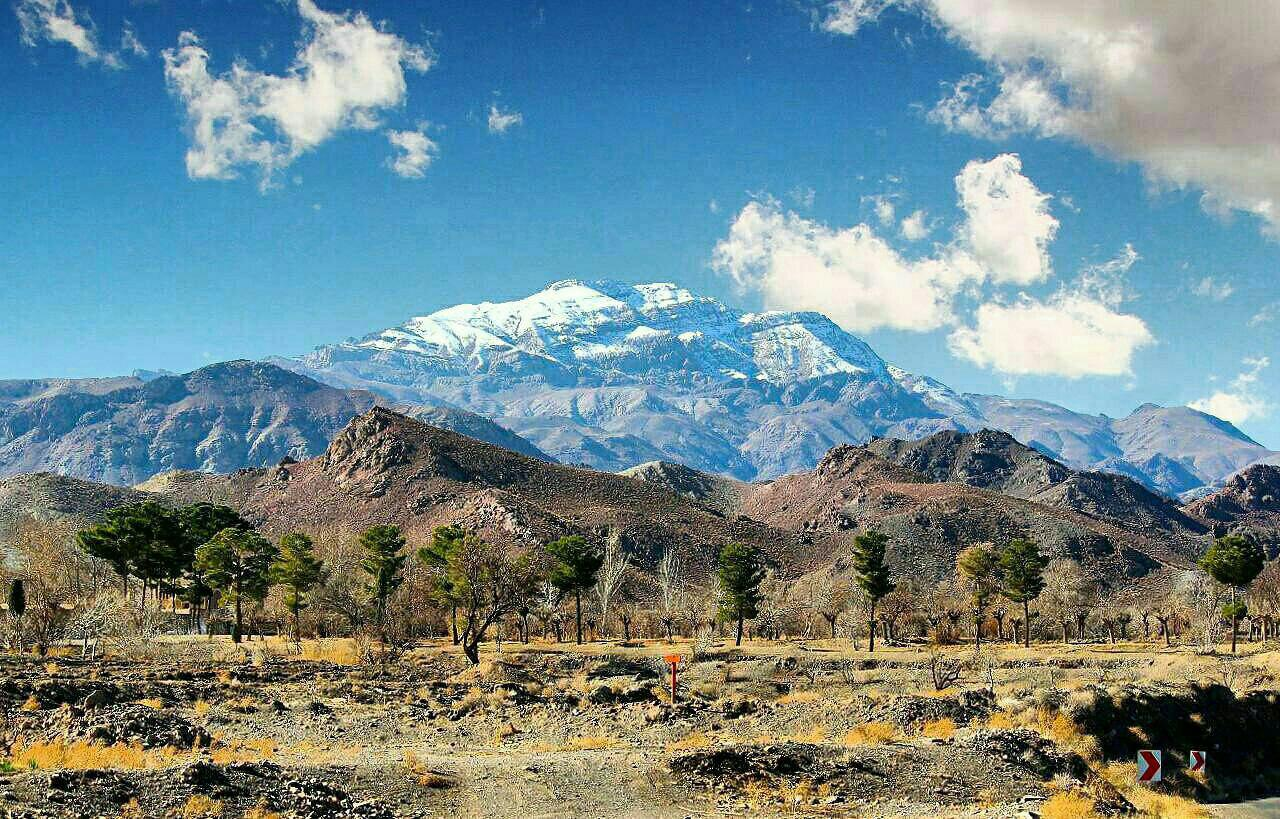
Zibad Mountain

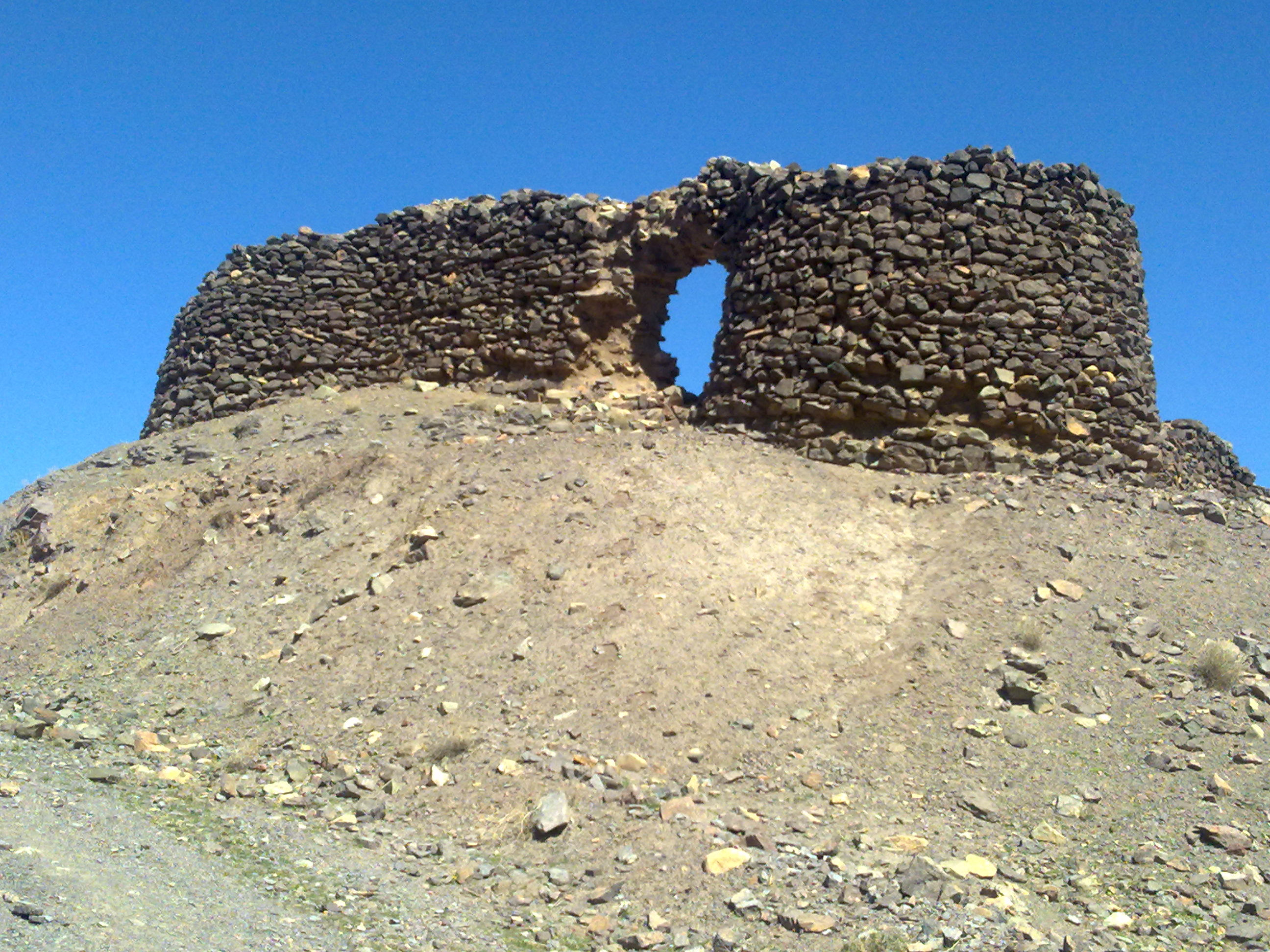
Sassanian castle

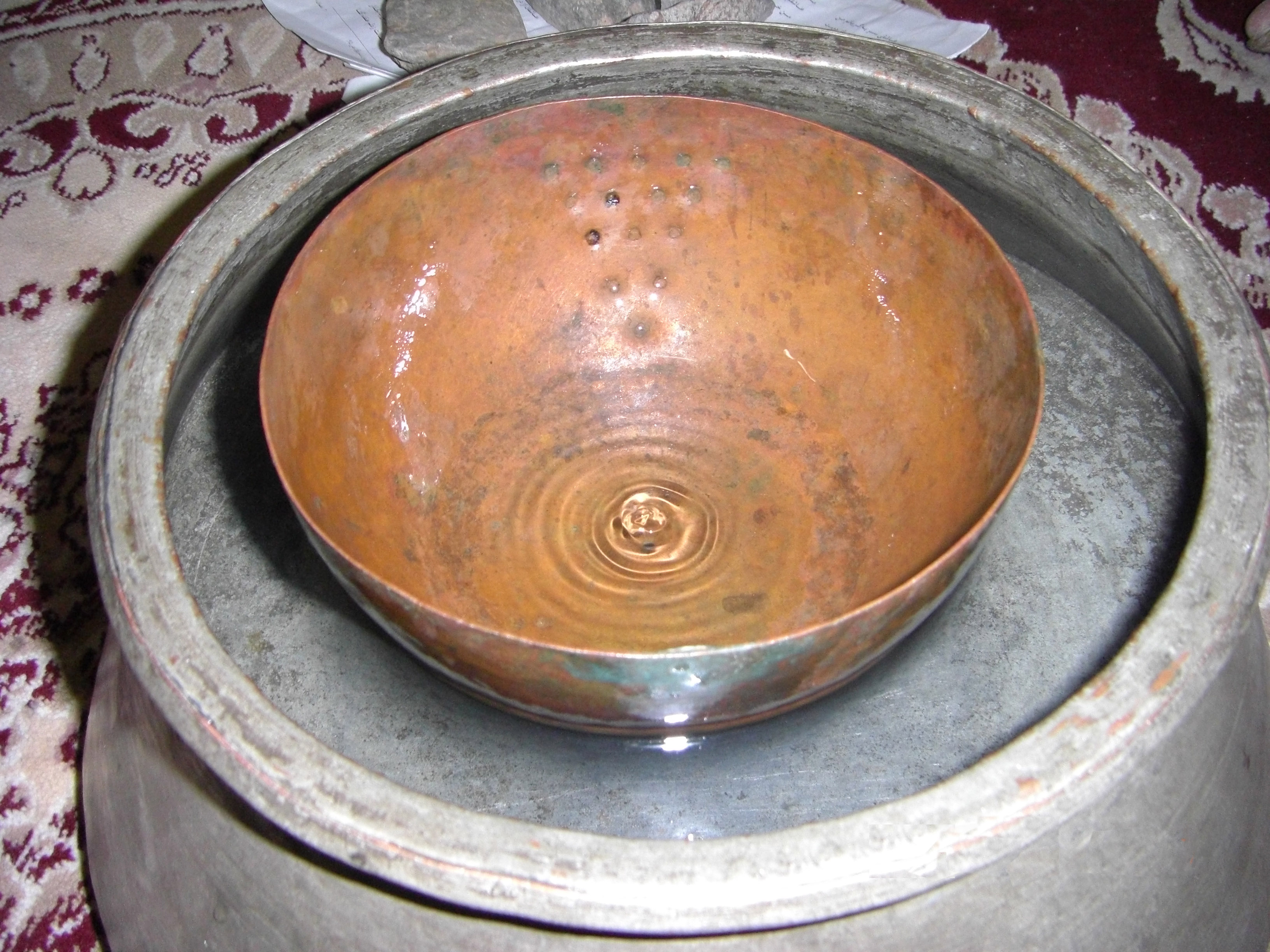
Ancient water clock used in a qanat of Gonabad 2,500 years ago

== See also ==
- Davazdah Rokh
- Zibad
- Kūh-e Tīr Māhī
- Traditional water sources of Persian antiquity

Media related to Gonabad County at Wikimedia Commons
