= Rowshanabad =

Rowshanabad (Persian: روشن اباد) may refer to:

- Rowshanabad, Kerman
- Rowshanabad, Kohgiluyeh and Boyer-Ahmad
- Rowshanabad, Mazandaran
- Rowshanabad, Razavi Khorasan
- Rowshanabad, South Khorasan

== See also ==
- Roshanabad (disambiguation)
