= Roshanabad =

Roshanabad or Rashanabad (Persian: روشن آباد) may refer to:

- Roshanabad, Kohgiluyeh and Boyer-Ahmad
- Roshanabad, South Khorasan
- Roshanabad Rural District, in Golestan Province

== See also ==
- Rowshanabad (disambiguation)
- Rushanabad
