= Rowshanavand =

Rowshanavand or Rowshnavand or Rushanavand or Rushnawand (Persian: روشناوند) may refer to:

- Rushnavand, Razavi Khorasan
- Rowshanavand, Birjand, South Khorasan Province
