= Kalateh-ye Mesgarha =

Kalateh-ye Mesgarha كلاته مسگرا
- Village
- Location within Iran
- Coordinates: 34°29′13″N 58°42′23″E
- Country: Iran
- Province: Razavi Khorasan
- County: Gonabad
- Bakhsh: Central
- Rural District: Howmeh

Population (2006)
  - Total: 17
- Time zone: UTC+3:30 (IRST)
  - Summer (DST): UTC+4:30 (IRDT)

Kalateh-ye Mesgarha (Persian: كلاته مسگرا, also Romanized as Kalāteh-ye Mesgarhā and Kalāteh-ye Mesgarā) is a village in Howmeh Rural District, in the Central District of Gonabad County, Razavi Khorasan Province, Iran. At the 2006 census, its population was 17, in 4 families.
