= Riab =

Riab (Persian: رياب) may refer to:

- Riab, Gilan
- Riab, Razavi Khorasan
