= Kheybari =

Kheybari خيبري
- Village
- Location within Iran
- Coordinates: 34°22′10″N 58°43′35″E
- Country: Iran
- Province: Razavi Khorasan
- County: Gonabad
- Bakhsh: Central
- Rural District: Howmeh

Population (2006)
  - Total: 861
- Time zone: UTC+3:30 (IRST)
  - Summer (DST): UTC+4:30 (IRDT)

Kheybari (Persian: خيبري, also Romanized as Kheybarī) is a village in Howmeh Rural District, in the Central District of Gonabad County, Razavi Khorasan Province, Iran. At the 2006 census, its population was 861, in 273 families.
