= Quzhd =

Quzhd (Persian: قوژد) may refer to:

- Quzhd, Gonabad
- Quzhd, Kashmar

== See also ==
- Quzhdabad
