= Asu-e Jadid =

Village in Razavi Khorasan province, Iran

Asu-e Jadid Persian: اسوجديد
- Village
- Location within Iran
- Coordinates: 34°22′19″N 59°03′37″E
- Country: Iran
- Province: Razavi Khorasan
- County: Gonabad
- District: Central
- Rural District: Pas Kalut

Population (2016)
  - Total: 61
- Time zone: UTC+3:30 (IRST)

Asu-e Jadid (Persian: اسوجديد) (Note: Also romanized as Asū Jadīd and Asū-e Jadīd; also known as Āsān and Asū) is a village in Pas Kalut Rural District of the Central District in Gonabad County, Razavi Khorasan province, Iran.

== Demographics ==
=== Population ===
At the time of the 2006 National Census, the village's population was 127 spread over 32 households. The following census in 2011 counted 95 people spread over 27 households. The 2016 census measured the population of the village as 61 people spread over 24 households.
