= Rahmatabad, Gonabad =

Village in Razavi Khorasan province, Iran

Rahmatabad Persian: رحمت اباد
- Village
- Location within Iran
- Coordinates: 34°06′21″N 59°19′25″E
- Country: Iran
- Province: Razavi Khorasan
- County: Gonabad
- District: Central
- Rural District: Pas Kalut

Population (2016)
  - Total: 589
- Time zone: UTC+3:30 (IRST)

Rahmatabad (Persian: رحمت اباد) (Note: Also romanized as Raḩmatābād; also known as Kalāteh-ye Khān (كلاته خان)) is a village in Pas Kalut Rural District of the Central District in Gonabad County, Razavi Khorasan province, Iran.

== Demographics ==
=== Population ===
At the time of the 2006 National Census, the village's population was 533 in 102 households. The following census in 2011 counted 595 people in 134 households. The 2016 census measured the population of the village as 589 people in 133 households.
