= Chah-e Namak =

Village in Razavi Khorasan province, Iran

Chah-e Namak Persian: چاه نمك
- Village
- Location within Iran
- Coordinates: 34°10′01″N 59°14′46″E
- Country: Iran
- Province: Razavi Khorasan
- County: Gonabad
- District: Central
- Rural District: Pas Kalut

Population (2016)
  - Total: 53
- Time zone: UTC+3:30 (IRST)

Chah-e Namak (Persian: چاه نمك) (Note: Also romanized as Chāh-e Namak) is a village in Pas Kalut Rural District of the Central District in Gonabad County, Razavi Khorasan province, Iran.

== Demographics ==
=== Population ===
At the time of the 2006 National Census, the village's population was 94 in 31 households. The following census in 2011 counted 59 people in 24 households. The 2016 census measured the population of the village as 53 people in 23 households.
