= Behabad, Gonabad =

Village in Razavi Khorasan province, Iran

Behabad Persian: بهاباد
- Village
- Location within Iran
- Coordinates: 34°19′39″N 58°42′55″E
- Country: Iran
- Province: Razavi Khorasan
- County: Gonabad
- District: Central
- Rural District: Howmeh

Population (2016)
  - Total: 1,512
- Time zone: UTC+3:30 (IRST)

Behabad (Persian: بهاباد) (Note: Also romanized as Behābād; also known as Bahāābād) is a village in Howmeh Rural District of the Central District in Gonabad County, Razavi Khorasan province, Iran.

== Demographics ==
=== Population ===
At the time of the 2006 National Census, the village's population was 1,423 in 389 households. The following census in 2011 counted 1,447 people in 440 households. The 2016 census measured the population of the village as 1,512 people in 474 households.
