= Bimorgh =

Village in Razavi Khorasan province, Iran

Bimorgh Persian: بيمرغ
- Village
- Location within Iran
- Coordinates: 34°24′44″N 58°57′41″E
- Country: Iran
- Province: Razavi Khorasan
- County: Gonabad
- District: Central
- Rural District: Pas Kalut

Population (2016)
  - Total: 774
- Time zone: UTC+3:30 (IRST)

Bimorgh (Persian: بيمرغ) (Note: Also romanized as Bīmorgh; also known as Bī Mūrch, Bīmūraq, Bīmurgh, Bīmūrq, and Binurgh) is a village in, and the capital of, Pas Kalut Rural District in the Central District of Gonabad County, Razavi Khorasan province, Iran.

== Demographics ==
=== Population ===
At the time of the 2006 National Census, the village's population was 973 in 290 households. The following census in 2011 counted 856 people in 299 households. The 2016 census measured the population of the village as 774 people in 288 households.
