= Howz-e Sorkh =

Howz-e Sorkh (Persian: حوض سرخ) may refer to:

- Howz-e Sorkh, Gonabad
- Howz-e Sorkh, Torbat-e Heydarieh
