= Dowlui =

Village in Razavi Khorasan province, Iran

Dowlui Persian: دولوئي
- Village
- Location within Iran
- Coordinates: 34°22′07″N 58°43′21″E
- Country: Iran
- Province: Razavi Khorasan
- County: Gonabad
- District: Central
- Rural District: Howmeh

Population (2016)
  - Total: 2,031
- Time zone: UTC+3:30 (IRST)

Dowlui (Persian: دولوئي) (Note: Also romanized as Dowlūī; also known as Delūī (دلوئي)) is a village in Howmeh Rural District of the Central District in Gonabad County, Razavi Khorasan province, Iran.

== Demographics ==
=== Population ===
At the time of the 2006 National Census, the village's population was 1,360 in 411 households. The following census in 2011 counted 1,760 people in 557 households. The 2016 census measured the population of the village as 2,031 people in 632 households.
