= Biland =

Village in Razavi Khorasan province, Iran

Biland Persian: بيلند
- Village
- Location within Iran
- Coordinates: 34°23′31″N 58°42′04″E
- Country: Iran
- Province: Razavi Khorasan
- County: Gonabad
- District: Central
- Rural District: Howmeh

Population (2016)
  - Total: 5,004
- Time zone: UTC+3:30 (IRST)
- Website: www.bilond.com

Biland (Persian: بيلند) (Note: Also romanized as Bilond and Bīlond; also known as Bīlownd (بيلوند), Bilūnd, and Bīlvand) is a village in, and the capital of, Howmeh Rural District in the Central District of Gonabad County, Razavi Khorasan province, Iran.

== Demographics ==
=== Population ===
At the time of the 2006 National Census, the village's population was 4,235 in 1,110 households. The following census in 2011 counted 4,528 people in 1,327 households. The 2016 census measured the population of the village as 5,004 people in 1,515 households. It was the most populous village in its rural district.
