= Bagh-e Asiya =

Village in Razavi Khorasan province, Iran

Bagh-e Asiya Persian: باغ اسيا
- Village
- Location within Iran
- Coordinates: 34°23′01″N 58°41′40″E
- Country: Iran
- Province: Razavi Khorasan
- County: Gonabad
- District: Central
- Rural District: Howmeh

Population (2016)
  - Total: 1,990
- Time zone: UTC+3:30 (IRST)

Bagh-e Asiya (Persian: باغ اسيا) (Note: Also romanized as Bāgh-e Āsīyā) is a village in Howmeh Rural District of the Central District in Gonabad County, Razavi Khorasan province, Iran.

== Demographics ==
=== Population ===
At the time of the 2006 National Census, the village's population was 1,690 in 451 households. The following census in 2011 counted 1,795 people in 532 households. The 2016 census measured the population of the village as 1,990 people in 648 households.
