= Omrani =

Omrani may refer to:

- Abdelhakim Omrani (b. 1991), Algerian footballer
- Billel Omrani (b. 1993), French footballer
- Omrani, Iran, a village in Razavi Khorasan Province, Iran
