= Azizabad, Gonabad =

Azizabad عزيزاباد
- Village
- Location within Iran
- Coordinates: 34°28′30″N 58°44′46″E
- Country: Iran
- Province: Razavi Khorasan
- County: Gonabad
- Bakhsh: Central
- Rural District: Howmeh

Population (2006)
  - Total: 180
- Time zone: UTC+3:30 (IRST)
  - Summer (DST): UTC+4:30 (IRDT)

Azizabad (Persian: عزيزاباد, also Romanized as ‘Azīzābād; also known as ‘Azīzābād-e ‘Omrānī and ‘Omrānī) is a village in Howmeh Rural District, in the Central District of Gonabad County, Razavi Khorasan Province, Iran. At the 2006 census, its population was 180, in 58 families.

== See also ==
- List of cities, towns and villages in Razavi Khorasan Province
