= Aruk, Iran =

Village in Razavi Khorasan province, Iran

Aruk Persian: اروك
- Village
- Location within Iran
- Coordinates: 34°23′29″N 59°00′37″E
- Country: Iran
- Province: Razavi Khorasan
- County: Gonabad
- District: Central
- Rural District: Pas Kalut

Population (2016)
  - Total: 123
- Time zone: UTC+3:30 (IRST)

Aruk (Persian: اروك) (Note: Also romanized as Arūk; also known as Ardāk) is a village in Pas Kalut Rural District of the Central District in Gonabad County, Razavi Khorasan province, Iran.

== Demographics ==
=== Population ===
At the time of the 2006 National Census, the village's population was 291 in 48 households. The following census in 2011 counted 166 people in 44 households. The 2016 census measured the population of the village as 123 people in 45 households.
