= Rahn, Iran =

Village in Razavi Khorasan province, Iran

Rahn Persian: رهن
- Village
- Location within Iran
- Coordinates: 34°20′08″N 58°38′56″E
- Country: Iran
- Province: Razavi Khorasan
- County: Gonabad
- District: Central
- Rural District: Howmeh

Population (2016)
  - Total: 1,639
- Time zone: UTC+3:30 (IRST)

Rahn (Persian: رهن) (Note: Also known as Dahan and Dehan) is a village in Howmeh Rural District of the Central District in Gonabad County, Razavi Khorasan province, Iran.

== Demographics ==
=== Population ===
At the time of the 2006 National Census, the village's population was 941 in 264 households. The following census in 2011 counted 1,338 people in 422 households. The 2016 census measured the population of the village as 1,639 people in 507 households.
