= Kalateh-ye Mazar, Razavi Khorasan =

Village in Razavi Khorasan province, Iran

Kalateh-ye Mazar Persian: كلاته مزار
- Village
- Country: Iran
- Province: Razavi Khorasan
- County: Gonabad
- District: Central
- Rural District: Pas Kalut

Population (2016)
  - Total: 7
- Time zone: UTC+3:30 (IRST)

Kalateh-ye Mazar (Persian: كلاته مزار) (Note: Also romanized as Kalāteh-ye Mazār) is a village in Pas Kalut Rural District of the Central District in Gonabad County, Razavi Khorasan province, Iran.

== Demographics ==
=== Population ===
At the time of the 2006 National Census, the village's population was 50 in 20 households. The following census in 2011 counted seven people in four households. The 2016 census again measured the population of the village as seven people in four households.
