= Jameh Mosque of Gonabad =

Mosque in Gonabad, Razavi Khorasan, Iran

Jāmeh Mosque of Gonabad
- مسجد جامع گناباد
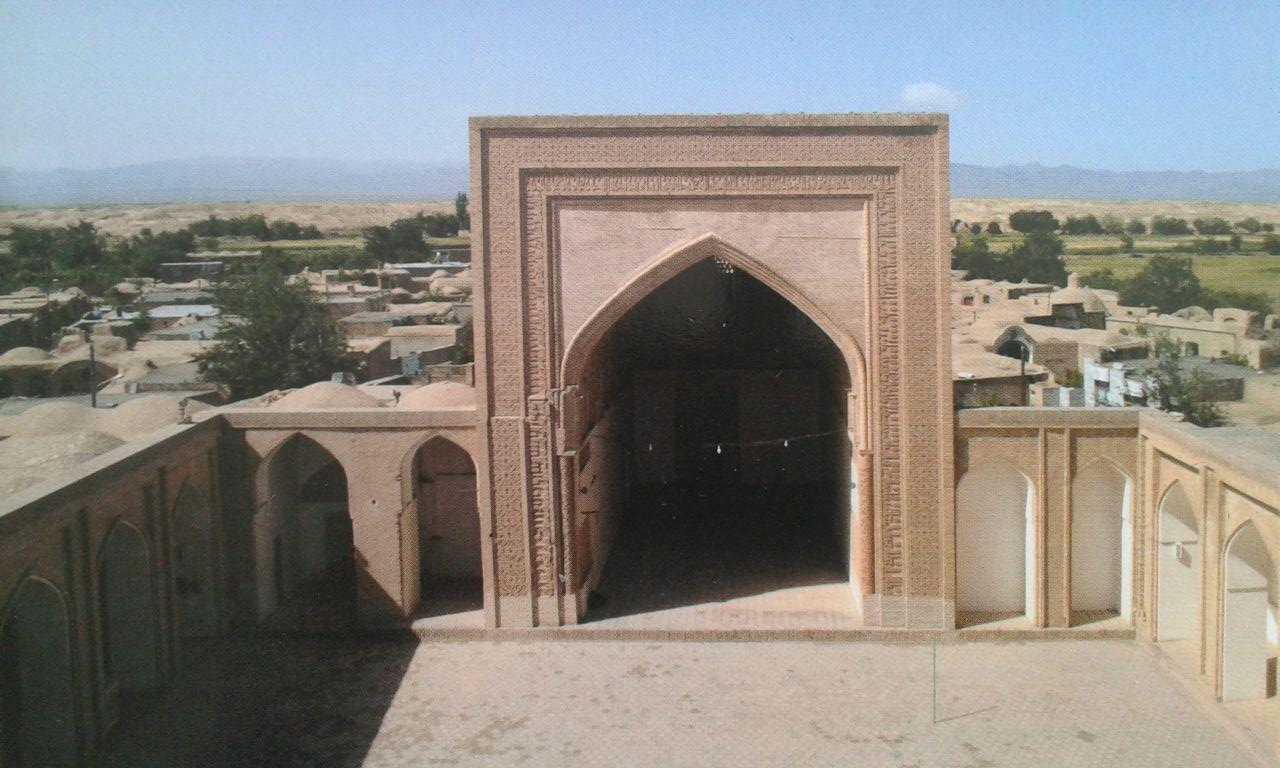
- The mosque iwan in 2016

- Location of the mosque in Iran

Religion
- Affiliation: Shia Islam
- Ecclesiastical or organisational status: Friday mosque
- Status: Active

Location
- Location: Gonabad, Razavi Khorasan Province
- Country: Iran
- Coordinates: 34°20′05″N 58°42′01″E

Architecture
- Type: Mosque architecture
- Style: Seljuk; Kharizmshahid; Qajar
- Completed: 1213 CE

Specifications
- Domes: One (large); Six (small)
- Minaret: Two (partially destroyed)
- Inscriptions: Three (maybe more)
- Materials: Bricks; mortar; tiles; stucco

Iran National Heritage List
- Official name: Friday Mosque of Gonabad
- Type: Friday Mosque
- Designated: 1940
- Reference no.: 325
- Conservation organization: Cultural Heritage, Handicrafts and Tourism Organization of Iran

The Jāmeh Mosque of Gonabad (Persian: مسجد جامع گناباد, romanized: Masjid-i Jami' Gunabad) is a Shi'ite Friday mosque (jāmeh) located in Gonabad, in the province of Razavi Khorasan, Iran.

The 13th-century mosque was added to the Iran National Heritage List on 10 February 1940, administered by the Cultural Heritage, Handicrafts and Tourism Organization of Iran.

== Architecture ==
The Friday mosque of Gunabad is located in the south of Khorasan province. Completed in 1213 CE, during the Kharizmshahid era, it was damaged by earthquakes and renovated several times. A major renovation was undertaken in the Qajar era. Researchers' findings indicate that this mosque was built on the site of an older mosque and its antiquity is attributed to the Ilkhanid period.

The mosque is a two-iwan mosque centered on a large courtyard that measures 44 by 66 metres (144 by 217 ft). It is oriented north-south, with two main entrances at the northeast and southeast corners of the mosque. The northeast entrance leads through a corridor to the courtyard. The main courtyard iwan, which contains the mihrab, is along the south qibla wall of the courtyard; a square prayer hall adjoins this south iwan, which is 9 metres (30 ft) wide, 18 metres (59 ft) deep, and 20 metres (66 ft) high. A smaller iwan, also joined to a prayer hall, runs along the north side of the court; this iwan is 6.4 metres (21 ft) wide, 11 metres (36 ft) deep, and 12 metres (39 ft) high. The remains of two minarets, probably destroyed in an earthquake, rest atop the iwan walls. The prayer hall adjoining the east corner of the north iwan measures 11.5 by 17 metres (38 by 56 ft). Its roof is supported by its walls and an additional four columns that are square in plan.

A prayer hall with seven arcades runs along the east side of the court. Square in plan and measuring 10 square metres (110 sq ft), the east prayer hall is roofed by a dome that is supported by four columns located at each corner of the hall. Along the west is an arcade divided into seven sections and topped with small domes.

The mosque is constructed of brick, and its interior is stuccoed. Its northeast entrance has a (probably Qajar-period) portal featuring a pointed arch with floral patterns carved in stucco. The south iwan is decorated with brick ornament; its interior is adorned with Kufic arabesques and a muqarnas ceiling. The north iwan is also ornamented with brick and tile work. Its interior walls are decorated with carved stucco up to a height of 6 metres (20 ft).

The stucco mihrab is half-octagonal in plan and is decorated with geometric and floral patterns as well as Kufic inscriptions. The remains of an older stucco mihrab with geometric patterns were found on the qibla wall of the eastern prayer hall. The arcades facing the courtyard are closed with wooden doors shaped like pointed arches. Under the arch of the portal leading into the main prayer hall is a Kufic inscription in brick dating from the Seljuk period; this inscription was later covered.

== Gallery ==
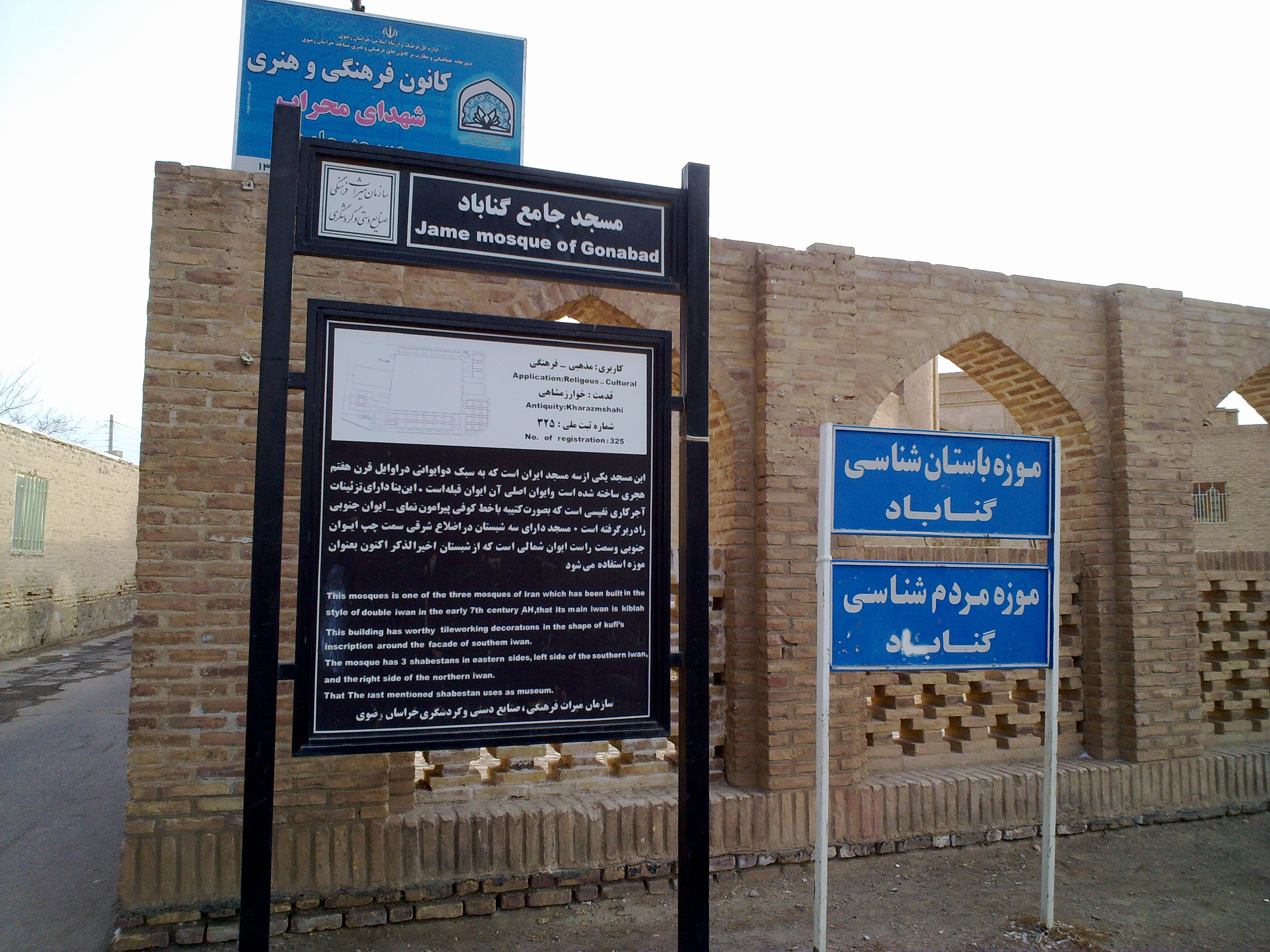

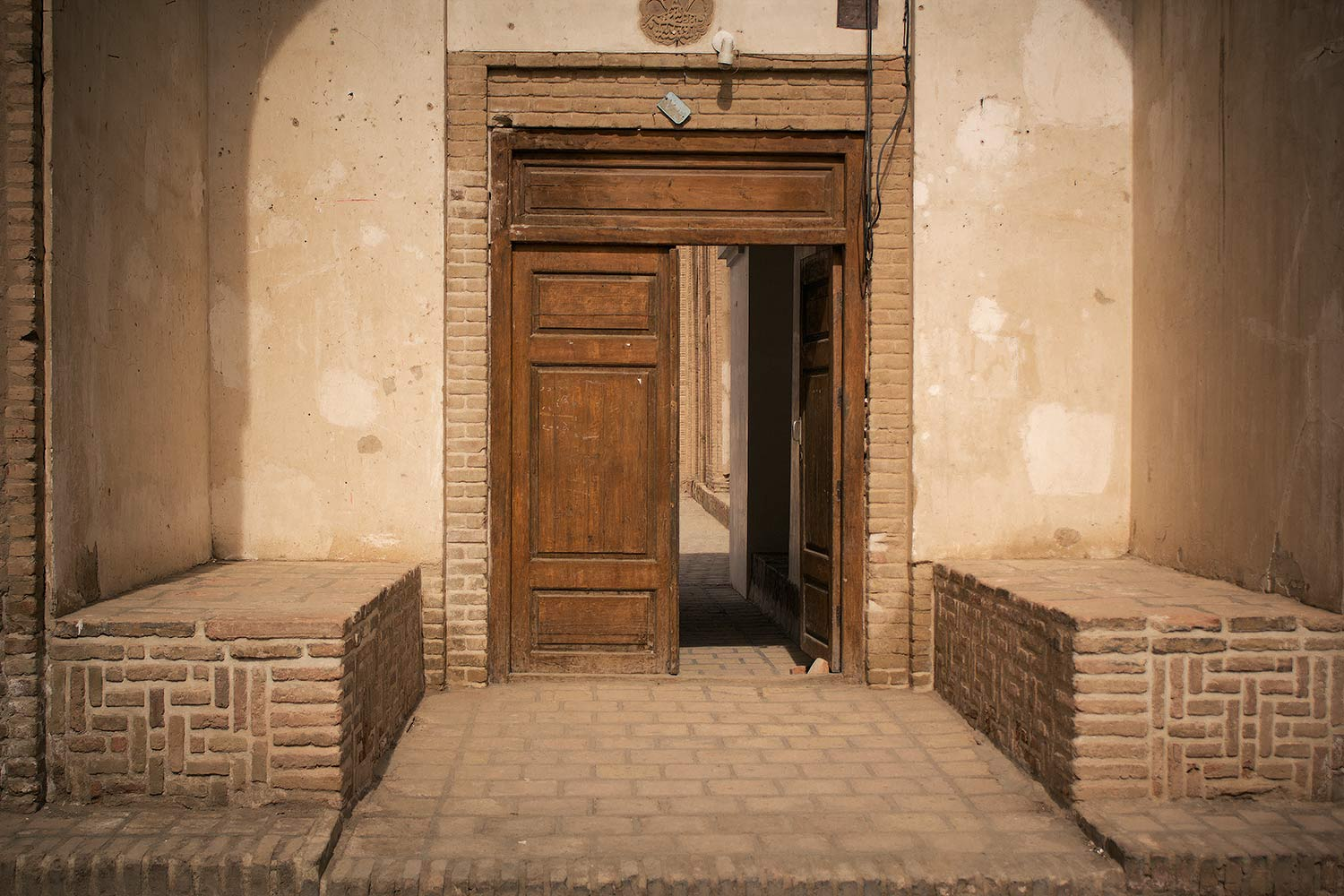

== See also ==
- Shia Islam in Iran
- List of mosques in Iran
