= Qanbarabad, Razavi Khorasan =

Village in Razavi Khorasan province, Iran

Qanbarabad Persian: قنبراباد
- Village
- Location within Iran
- Coordinates: 34°22′28″N 58°40′06″E
- Country: Iran
- Province: Razavi Khorasan
- County: Gonabad
- District: Central
- Rural District: Howmeh

Population (2016)
  - Total: 3,106
- Time zone: UTC+3:30 (IRST)

Qanbarabad (Persian: قنبراباد) (Note: Also romanized as Qanbarābād) is a village in Howmeh Rural District of the Central District in Gonabad County, Razavi Khorasan province, Iran.

== Demographics ==
=== Population ===
At the time of the 2006 National Census, the village's population was 1,720 in 500 households. The following census in 2011 counted 2,598 people in 777 households. The 2016 census measured the population of the village as 3,106 people in 906 households.
