= Now Deh-e Pashtak =

Village in Razavi Khorasan province, Iran

Now Deh-e Pashtak Persian: نوده پشتك
- Village
- Location within Iran
- Coordinates: 34°26′12″N 59°04′16″E
- Country: Iran
- Province: Razavi Khorasan
- County: Gonabad
- District: Central
- Rural District: Pas Kalut

Population (2016)
  - Total: 1,920
- Time zone: UTC+3:30 (IRST)

Now Deh-e Pashtak (Persian: نوده پشتك) (Note: Also known as Naudeh Pasang, Now Deh Pashang (نوده پشنگ), Now Deh-e Pashang, Now Deh-Ye-Pashang, and Pashang) is a village in Pas Kalut Rural District of the Central District in Gonabad County, Razavi Khorasan province, Iran.

== Demographics ==
=== Population ===
At the time of the 2006 National Census, the village's population was 1,688 in 415 households. The following census in 2011 counted 1,680 people in 479 households. The 2016 census measured the population of the village as 1,920 people in 552 households.
