= Hajjiabad, Gonabad =

Village in Razavi Khorasan province, Iran

Hajjiabad Persian: حاجي اباد
- Village
- Location within Iran
- Coordinates: 34°26′52″N 58°49′51″E
- Country: Iran
- Province: Razavi Khorasan
- County: Gonabad
- District: Central
- Rural District: Pas Kalut

Population (2016)
  - Total: 474
- Time zone: UTC+3:30 (IRST)

Hajjiabad (Persian: حاجي اباد) (Note: Also romanized as Ḩājjīābād) is a village in Pas Kalut Rural District of the Central District in Gonabad County, Razavi Khorasan province, Iran.

== Demographics ==
=== Population ===
At the time of the 2006 National Census, the village's population was 554 in 145 households. The following census in 2011 counted 581 people in 157 households. The 2016 census measured the population of the village as 474 people in 164 households.
