= Chah-e Meyghuni-ye Pain =

Village in Razavi Khorasan province, Iran

Chah-e Meyghuni-ye Pain Persian: چاه ميغوني پائين
- Village
- Location within Iran
- Coordinates: 34°07′33″N 59°07′49″E
- Country: Iran
- Province: Razavi Khorasan
- County: Gonabad
- District: Central
- Rural District: Pas Kalut

Population (2016)
  - Total: 81
- Time zone: UTC+3:30 (IRST)

Chah-e Meyghuni-ye Pain (Persian: چاه ميغوني پائين) (Note: Also romanized as Chāh-e Meyghunī-ye Pā’īn) is a village in Pas Kalut Rural District of the Central District in Gonabad County, Razavi Khorasan province, Iran.

== Demographics ==
=== Population ===
At the time of the 2006 National Census, the village's population was 137 in 33 households. The following census in 2011 counted 95 people in 31 households. The 2016 census measured the population of the village as 81 people in 30 households.
