= Geysur-e Nusazi =

Village in Razavi Khorasan province, Iran

Geysur-e Nusazi Persian: گيسورنوسازي
- Village
- Location within Iran
- Coordinates: 34°15′54″N 59°15′36″E
- Country: Iran
- Province: Razavi Khorasan
- County: Gonabad
- District: Central
- Rural District: Pas Kalut

Population (2016)
  - Total: 1,507
- Time zone: UTC+3:30 (IRST)

Geysur-e Nusazi (Persian: گيسورنوسازي) (Note: Also romanized as Geysūr-e Nūsāzī, Geysvarnusazi, and Geysvarnūsāzī; also known as Geysur, Geysur-e Bala, and Geysur-e Olya) is a village in Pas Kalut Rural District of the Central District in Gonabad County, Razavi Khorasan province, Iran.

== Demographics ==
=== Population ===
At the time of the 2006 National Census, the village's population was 1,341 in 363 households. The following census in 2011 counted 1,427 people in 423 households. The 2016 census measured the population of the village as 1,507 people in 456 households.
