= Shurab-e Nusazi =

Village in Razavi Khorasan province, Iran

Shurab-e Nusazi Persian: شوراب نوسازي
- Village
- Location within Iran
- Coordinates: 34°22′01″N 58°51′06″E
- Country: Iran
- Province: Razavi Khorasan
- County: Gonabad
- District: Central
- Rural District: Pas Kalut

Population (2016)
  - Total: 177
- Time zone: UTC+3:30 (IRST)

Shurab-e Nusazi (Persian: شوراب نوسازي) (Note: Also romanized as Shūrāb-e Nūsāzī; also known as Shūr Āb) is a village in Pas Kalut Rural District of the Central District in Gonabad County, Razavi Khorasan province, Iran.

== Demographics ==
=== Population ===
At the time of the 2006 National Census, the village's population was 168 in 64 households. The following census in 2011 counted 134 people in 57 households. The 2016 census measured the population of the village as 177 people in 67 households.
