= Tavakkolabad, Razavi Khorasan =

Village in Razavi Khorasan province, Iran

Tavakkolabad Persian: توكل اباد
- Village
- Country: Iran
- Province: Razavi Khorasan
- County: Gonabad
- District: Central
- Rural District: Pas Kalut

Population (2016)
  - Total: 28
- Time zone: UTC+3:30 (IRST)

Tavakkolabad (Persian: توكل اباد) (Note: Also romanized as Tavakkolābād, Tukalabad and Tūḵalābād) is a village in Pas Kalut Rural District of the Central District in Gonabad County, Razavi Khorasan province, Iran.

== Demographics ==
=== Population ===
At the time of the 2006 National Census, the village's population was 28 in nine households. The following census in 2011 counted 32 people in nine households. The 2016 census measured the population of the village as 28 people in eight households.
