= Mend, Iran =

Village in Razavi Khorasan province, Iran

Mend Persian: مند
- Village
- Location within Iran
- Coordinates: 34°22′27″N 58°42′30″E
- Country: Iran
- Province: Razavi Khorasan
- County: Gonabad
- District: Central
- Rural District: Howmeh

Population (2016)
  - Total: 1,917
- Time zone: UTC+3:30 (IRST)

Mend (Persian: مند) is a village in Howmeh Rural District of the Central District in Gonabad County, Razavi Khorasan province, Iran.

== Demographics ==
=== Population ===
At the time of the 2006 National Census, the village's population was 1,632 in 456 households. The following census in 2011 counted 1,793 people in 529 households. The 2016 census measured the population of the village as 1,917 people in 570 households.
