= Riab, Razavi Khorasan =

Reiab رياب
- Village
- Location within Iran
- Coordinates: 34°20′57″N 58°37′51″E
- Country: Iran
- Province: Razavi Khorasan
- County: Gonabad
- Bakhsh: Central
- Rural District: Howmeh

Population (2006)
  - Total: 623
- Time zone: UTC+3:30 (IRST)
  - Summer (DST): UTC+4:30 (IRDT)

Reiab (Persian: رياب, also Romanized as Rīāb) is a village in Howmeh Rural District, in the Central District of Gonabad County, Razavi Khorasan Province, Iran. At the 2006 census, its population was 623, in 198 families.
