= Gonabad University of Medical Sciences =

- دانشگاه علوم پزشکی و خدمات بهداشتی درمانی گناباد
- Established: 1986
- Chancellor: Dr. Abdoljavad Khajavi
- Students: 2000
- Location: Gonabad, Iran
- Website: gmu.ac.ir

Gonabad University of Medical Sciences and Health Services is a public university in Iran, operating under the supervision of the Ministry of Health and Medical Education. It is located in Gonabad County and provides educational, research, and healthcare services to the southern region of Khorasan Province, serving an estimated population of 500,000. In 2014, the university was upgraded from Level 3 to Level 2 in the national ranking system for Iranian medical universities.The current president is Abdoljavad Khajavi.

== History ==
The institution originated in 1986 as the School of Nursing and Midwifery, initially operating under the auspices of Mashhad University of Medical Sciences with an inaugural cohort of 42 students. The nursing program was upgraded to a bachelor's degree in 1987.

In 1995, the institution became an independent medical faculty, separating from Mashhad University of Medical Sciences and operating directly under the Ministry of Health and Medical Education as the "Gonabad Faculty of Medical Sciences and Health Services."

The faculty underwent significant academic expansion starting in 2001. In 2008, the Supreme Council for the Expansion of Universities and Higher Education Institutions approved its transition to a university. This transition included the establishment of three independent faculties: the Faculty of Allied Medical Sciences, the Faculty of Health, and the Faculty of Nursing. Later in 2008, the Council authorized the establishment of the Faculty of Medicine, which was officially inaugurated in the presence of the then-Minister of Health, Marzieh Vahid-Dastjerdi.

== Student welfare and amenities ==
The university provides housing, dining, and transportation services for its students.

=== Accommodation ===
On-campus dormitory facilities include two complexes for female students ("Fajr 1" and "Fajr 2"). Off-campus housing is provided for male students across three complexes ("Naser," "Andisheh," and "Nasr"), alongside housing options for married students. A daily shuttle service operates between the dormitories, academic buildings, and teaching hospitals from 07:00 to 21:00.

=== Dining services ===
The main campus features a central dining hall operating with an automated ordering system. Additionally, independent dining facilities are established within all university dormitory complexes.

=== Sports facilities ===
The university provides athletic infrastructure for students and staff, primarily centered around the "Pouria" Sports Complex. Spanning 6,000 square meters, the complex includes multi-purpose indoor halls for Futsal, Volleyball, Handball, Basketball, Wrestling, Martial arts, Table tennis, Chess, and Darts.

Additional athletic facilities at the university include:

- An indoor Swimming pool covering 1,500 square meters, featuring pools for adults and children, a Jacuzzi, and dry and steam saunas.
- An artificial turf sports field, established in 2021.
- A dedicated bodybuilding facility, established in 2023.

=== Cultural and student activities ===
The University supports various student-led organizations, scientific associations, and clubs, covering cultural, religious, artistic, and social fields. These include Quran and Ahl al-Bayt associations, literary and poetic societies, art and film clubs, and the Red Crescent student branch.

Students from the university have participated in national cultural and Quranic festivals organized by the Ministry of Health, securing several regional and national rankings between 2016 and 2022.

=== Student support and counselling ===
The university provides student Counselling and support services through dedicated units:

- **Counselling and Mental health Canter:** Offers Psychology, educational, and behavioural counselling services, including academic support, family counselling, and mental health programs managed by university specialists.
- **Disciplinary Council:** Operates within the regulatory framework established by the Ministry of Health and Medical Education to address student conduct and administrative matters.

=== Research facilities ===
The university maintains a 700 m² research Laboratory spread across two floors. The facility includes specialized units for cellular and Molecular biology, Physiology, Pharmacology, Microbiology (clinical and food),Nanobiotechnology, and Environmental studies (noise and air pollution). The laboratory is equipped for diagnostic services, cell culture, and animal studies, featuring instrumentation such as PCR, Real-Time PCR, ELISA readers, and biological safety cabinets.

=== Electronic Testing Centre ===
The University operates an Electronic Testing Centre equipped with 120 testing stations and a dedicated, independent Internet network separate from the main campus infrastructure to ensure reliable digital examinations.

=== Central Library ===
The Central Library of Gonabad University of Medical Sciences has been operational since 1986. In 2013, the library moved to its current four-story facility, which covers an area of 3,886 m².

The library's holdings include:

- 62,156 book titles (Persian and non-Persian/Latin)
- 13,108 domestic and international periodical titles
- 6,109 subscribed electronic resources (journals, books, and multimedia)
- 32,466 e-book titles
- 160 Persian-language printed academic journals
- 1,056 research projects and theses
- 2,130 educational CDs

=== Administration ===
University Leadership
President	Dr. Abdoljavad Khajavi
Board of Trustees	Mohammad Reza Nouri Delouei; Mehdi Mehdizadeh; Hamid Banaei; Alireza Moslem; Farshid Abedi; Abolghasem Naderi

=== Academic Structure ===
The academic activities of the university are organized into several faculties:

==== Faculties ====
- Faculty of Medicine
- Faculty of Paramedicine
- Faculty of Health
- Faculty of Nursing and Midwifery

=== Vice-presidencies ===
The university's administration is organized into several deputy divisions:

- Deputy for Education
- Deputy for Research and Technology
- Deputy for Health
- Deputy for Management and Resource Development
- Deputy for Treatment
- Deputy for Cultural and Student Affairs
- Deputy for Food and Drug

== School of Medicine ==
The School of Medicine, Gonabad University of Medical Sciences is a medical school located in Gonabad, Razavi Khorasan,Iran. It operates under the Gonabad University of Medical Sciences.

=== History ===
The School of Medicine was initially established in 2009, occupying a building that currently serves as the university’s Vice-Chancellery for Education and Research. To accommodate the expanding academic programs, a new dedicated facility was constructed and officially inaugurated in 2017 by Hassan Ghazizadeh Hashemi, the then-Minister of Health and Medical Education.

=== Facilities and Campus ===
The school is housed in a modern, three-story facility featuring comprehensive educational and research infrastructure:

- Classroom: Over 17 classrooms with capacities ranging from 60 to 120 students, equipped with data projectors and climate control systems.
- Laboratory: Dedicated facilities for parasitology, microbiology, mycology, hematology, physiology, pathology, immunology, histology, biochemistry, and medical physics, alongside a comprehensive central research laboratory.
- Specialized Centers: Includes the Dr. Gharib Conference Hall, a clinical skills laboratory ("Skill Lab"), a clinical competency assessment center, a Net Lab, a student research committee, a Library, and an e-health association.
- Dissection Hall: Comprises changing rooms, a faculty room, a cadaver storage area, a classroom, three dissection rooms, a fixation unit, and an extensive collection of anatomical models (moulages).
- Administration: 6 administrative and departmental meeting rooms, 16 support rooms, faculty offices, and editorial offices for two academic Medical journals.

=== Faculty and Academics ===
- Staff: The school employs over 100 faculty members and academic staff specializing in basic and Clinical Scienceunder permanent, contractual, and memorandum-based appointments.
- Enrollment: Currently, 534 students are enrolled in the medical program. Since 2018, the faculty has also admitted International student, with 60 international students currently pursuing their studies.
- Graduates: Seven cohorts of medical students have graduated from the institution to date.
- Leadership: The faculty is headed by Dr. Jalil Mashari (subspecialist in Pediatric Nephrology). Dr. Rahaleh Derafshi serves as the Vice Dean for Clinical Education, and Dr. Ghasem Siadat-Panah serves as the Vice Dean for Basic Sciences Education.

=== Academic Performance and Achievements ===
Students at the faculty maintain strong academic outcomes:

- In national Basic Sciences and Pre-internship examinations, pass rates consistently exceed 95%, reaching 100% in multiple cohorts.
- Clinical Competency Examination pass rates exceed 95% across cohorts.
- 100% of eligible graduates from the first seven graduating cohorts successfully passed and matched into specialized medical residency programs through the National Residency Entrance Examination.

=== Future Development ===
In addition to undergraduate medical training, the faculty is currently developing specialized postgraduate residency programs in Pediatrics, Internal Medicine, Obstetrics and Gynaecology, and Anesthesiology.

== School of Nursing and Midwifery ==
The School of Nursing and Midwifery,Medical Sciences is an academic institution operating under the Gonabad University of Medical Sciences in Gonabad, Iran.

=== History ===
The school began its operations in 1986, initially admitting 42 students into an associate degree program in nursing under the supervision of Mashhad University of Medical Sciences. The program was upgraded to a bachelor's degree in 1987. In 1995, the institution gained independence, and in 2008, it officially became one of the core independent schools within the newly established Gonabad University of Medical Sciences.

=== Programs and Academics ===
The faculty offers a comprehensive range of academic programs across various levels:

- Undergraduate Programs: Bachelor of Science in Nursing and Emergency medical services, along with a discontinuous Bachelor's degree in Pre-hospital Emergency Medical Services.
- Postgraduate Master’s Programs: Specializations including Critical Care Nursing, Medical-surgical nursing, Community Health Nursing,Gerontological nursing, and Emergency nursing
- Doctoral Program: Ph.D. in Nursing.

=== School of Health ===
The School of Health at Gonabad University of Medical Sciences was established in 2008, coinciding with the institution's upgrade to university status, and officially commenced operations in 2017.

As of current data, the faculty comprises 20 academic staff members and 9 administrative personnel, serving 293 students. It offers academic programs across multiple levels:

- **Doctor of Philosophy (PhD):** Research-based Environmental Health
- **Master of Science (MSc):** Health Education and Health Promotion, Environmental Health Engineering
- **Bachelor of Science (BSc):** Public Health (continuous and discontinuous), Environmental Health Engineering, and Occupational Health and Safety Engineering
