= Quzhd, Gonabad =

Village in Razavi Khorasan province, Iran

Quzhd Persian: قوژد
- Village
- Location within Iran
- Coordinates: 34°24′55″N 58°44′16″E
- Country: Iran
- Province: Razavi Khorasan
- County: Gonabad
- District: Central
- Rural District: Howmeh

Population (2016)
  - Total: 1,313
- Time zone: UTC+3:30 (IRST)

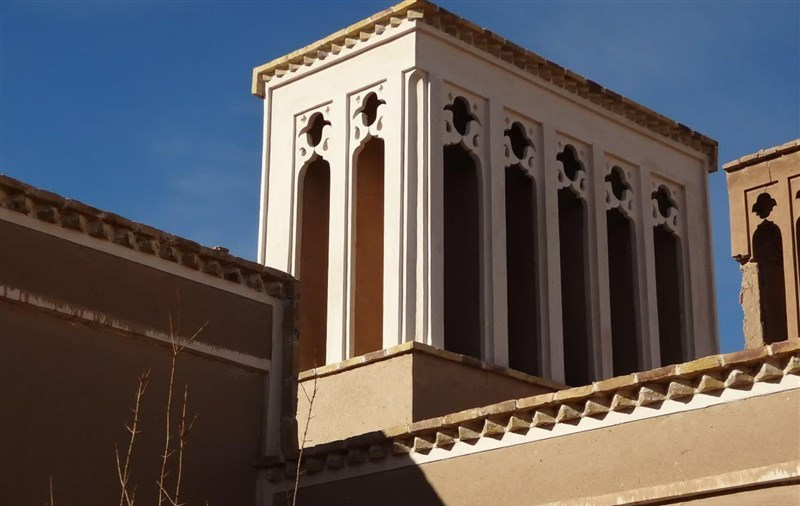

Quzhd (Persian: قوژد) (Note: Also romanized as Qūzhd; also known as Sarqodzhd) is a village in Howmeh Rural District of the Central District in Gonabad County, Razavi Khorasan province, Iran.

== Demographics ==
=== Population ===
At the time of the 2006 National Census, the village's population was 1,411 in 437 households. The following census in 2011 counted 1,311 people in 438 households. The 2016 census measured the population of the village as 1,313 people in 448 households.
