= Howz-e Sorkh, Gonabad =

Village in Razavi Khorasan province, Iran

Howz-e Sorkh Persian: حوض سرخ
- Village
- Location within Iran
- Coordinates: 34°34′16″N 58°51′29″E
- Country: Iran
- Province: Razavi Khorasan
- County: Gonabad
- District: Central
- Rural District: Pas Kalut

Population (2016)
  - Total: 0
- Time zone: UTC+3:30 (IRST)

Howz-e Sorkh (Persian: حوض سرخ) (Note: Also romanized as Ḩowẕ-e Sorkh) is a village in Pas Kalut Rural District of the Central District in Gonabad County, Razavi Khorasan province, Iran.

== Demographics ==
=== Population ===
At the time of the 2006 National Census, the village's population was four in four households. The village did not appear in the following census of 2011. The 2016 census measured the population of the village as zero.
