= Pas Kalut Rural District =

Rural district in Razavi Khorasan province, Iran

Pas Kalut Rural District Persian: دهستان پس كلوت
- Rural District
- Location within Iran
- Coordinates: 34°26′N 59°05′E
- Country: Iran
- Province: Razavi Khorasan
- County: Gonabad
- District: Central
- Established: 1987
- Capital: Bimorgh

Population (2016)
  - Total: 9,164
- Time zone: UTC+3:30 (IRST)

Pas Kalut Rural District (Persian: دهستان پس كلوت) is in the Central District of Gonabad County, Razavi Khorasan province, Iran. Its capital is the village of Bimorgh.

== Demographics ==
=== Population ===
At the time of the 2006 National Census, the rural district's population was 8,762 in 2,256 households. There were 9,331 inhabitants in 2,619 households at the following census of 2011. The 2016 census measured the population of the rural district as 9,164 in 2,751 households. The most populous of its 133 villages was Rushnavand (now a city), with 3,272 people.

=== Other villages in the rural district ===
- Aruk
- Asu-e Jadid
- Chah-e Meyghuni-ye Pain
- Chah-e Namak
- Geysur-e Nusazi
- Hajjiabad
- Howz-e Sorkh
- Jafarabad
- Kalateh-ye Mazar
- Now Deh-e Pashtak
- Rahmatabad
- Shurab-e Nusazi
- Tavakkolabad
