= Riab, Gilan =

Riab رياب
- Village
- Location within Iran
- Coordinates: 36°49′24″N 50°09′53″E
- Country: Iran
- Province: Gilan
- County: Rudsar
- Bakhsh: Rahimabad
- Rural District: Eshkevar-e Sofla

Population (2006)
  - Total: 17
- Time zone: UTC+3:30 (IRST)
  - Summer (DST): UTC+4:30 (IRDT)

Riab (Persian: رياب, also Romanized as Rīāb) is a village in Eshkevar-e Sofla Rural District, Rahimabad District, Rudsar County, Gilan Province, Iran. At the 2006 census, its population was 17, in 6 families.
