= Gonabad =

City in Razavi Khorasan Province, Iran

Gonabad Persian: گناباد
- City
- Location within Iran
- Coordinates: 34°21′27″N 58°40′42″E
- Country: Iran
- Province: Razavi Khorasan
- County: Gonabad
- District: Central

Population (2016)
  - Total: 40,773
- Time zone: UTC+3:30 (IRST)

Gonabad (Persian: گناباد) (Note: Also romanized as Gonābād; also known as Gūnābād; formerly Janābaz) is a city in the Central District of Gonabad County, Razavi Khorasan province, Iran, serving as capital of both the county and the district.

The city is best known as the home of the Gonabadi Dervishes and also for its qanats, (known also as kahriz). It is one of the most important producers of saffron in Iran. Other agricultural products include: grapes, pistachios, and pomegranates. The shrine of the Ni'matullāhī Gonabadi dervish order is located in Bidokht, a city in Gonabad County.

== History ==
The ancient Battle of the Twelve Combats (Davazdah Rokh) between the rival empires of Iran and Turan (Central Asia) took place at Zibad Castle in this city, as related in the epic Shahnameh.

The construction of this city is attributed to the Achaemenid kings and during the Seljuk Empire and Khwarazmian dynasty periods (fifth to seventh centuries AH) it was Shahrabadi.

Gonabad has also been recorded in Arabic and Islamic sources as Janabad, Kanabad, and Yanabad. The Yasemi family is one of the oldest families living in Gonabad.

== Demographics ==
=== Population ===
At the time of the 2006 National Census, the city's population was 34,563 in 9,789 households. The following census in 2011 counted 36,367 people in 10,389 households. The 2016 census measured the population of the city as 40,773 people in 12,037 households.

== Geography and climate ==
The city of Gonabad is in the south of Razavi Khorasan province on the Barakuh plateau. The city is located on a flat plateau and is 24 km away from the Barakuh mountain range. The highest peak of Barakuh is called Tirmehi Mountain or Zibad Mountain. The city of Gonabad is located in an arid and semi-desert climate on the edge of the desert. This city has been facing a serious drought crisis in recent years. Gonabad is located on the plain and plateau of Siah Kuh or Ghahestan mountain range. Ghahestan mountain range in Gonabad region is more known as Barakuh, Siah Kuh and Zibad mountain.

Climate data for Gonabad (1987-2010 normals), elevation: 1,056.0 m (3,464.6 ft)
Month	Jan	Feb	Mar	Apr	May	Jun	Jul	Aug	Sep	Oct	Nov	Dec	Year
Mean daily maximum °C (°F)	8.4 (47.1)	12.1 (53.8)	18.0 (64.4)	25.0 (77.0)	30.8 (87.4)	35.3 (95.5)	36.3 (97.3)	35.0 (95.0)	31.5 (88.7)	25.5 (77.9)	18.0 (64.4)	11.1 (52.0)	23.9 (75.0)
Daily mean °C (°F)	3.6 (38.5)	6.7 (44.1)	12.0 (53.6)	18.4 (65.1)	23.9 (75.0)	28.1 (82.6)	29.3 (84.7)	27.5 (81.5)	23.6 (74.5)	17.9 (64.2)	11.6 (52.9)	6.0 (42.8)	17.4 (63.3)
Mean daily minimum °C (°F)	−0.8 (30.6)	0.9 (33.6)	5.5 (41.9)	11.6 (52.9)	16.4 (61.5)	20.9 (69.6)	22.1 (71.8)	20.0 (68.0)	15.7 (60.3)	10.1 (50.2)	5.0 (41.0)	1.1 (34.0)	10.7 (51.3)
Average precipitation mm (inches)	23.2 (0.91)	25.2 (0.99)	31.0 (1.22)	23.1 (0.91)	5.4 (0.21)	0.3 (0.01)	0.4 (0.02)	0.0 (0.0)	0.1 (0.00)	2.1 (0.08)	7.9 (0.31)	18.7 (0.74)	137.4 (5.4)
Average relative humidity (%)	64	57	48	38	28	22	22	21	23	30	42	61	38
Average dew point °C (°F)	−3.0 (26.6)	−2.0 (28.4)	0.2 (32.4)	2.8 (37.0)	4.1 (39.4)	5.0 (41.0)	5.9 (42.6)	4.1 (39.4)	1.5 (34.7)	−0.2 (31.6)	−1.4 (29.5)	−1.4 (29.5)	1.3 (34.3)
Mean monthly sunshine hours	180.7	188.3	216.4	242.5	316.0	349.5	371.9	358.7	317.6	282.1	226.7	190.0	3,240.4
Source: Iran Meteorological Organization (mean min temperatures 1987-2005), (dew point), (humidity 1987-2005), (precipitation), (sunshine)

== Historical sites, ancient artifacts and tourism ==
=== Forud Castle ===
Forud Castle is a historical castle located in Gonabad County in Razavi Khorasan Province, The longevity of this fortress dates back to the Parthian Empire.

=== Zibad Castle ===
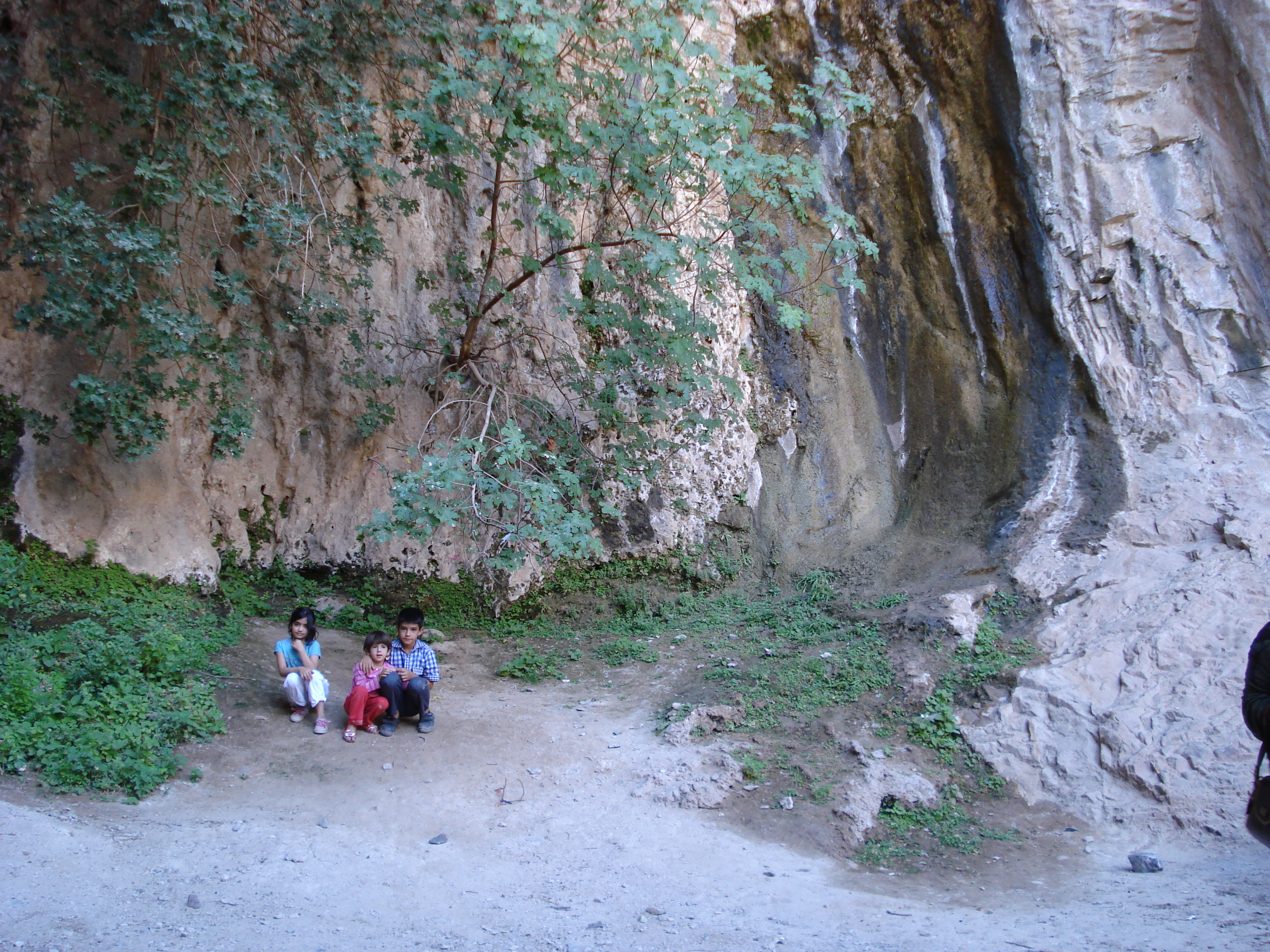
Darb Soufeh.zibad a Sassanid castle

Zibad Castle is one of the four historical monuments of Zibad, Iran. In 2001, the castle was registered as a national property in Iran, which is related to the history of pre-Islamic Iran, and is located in Gonabad city, Kakhk district, in the residential area of Zibad. It has been registered as national heritage. In addition to the castle of Zibad, there are also the royal castle of Zibad nationally registered under the name of Shahab Castle in 2002.

=== Jameh Mosque of Gonabad ===
The Jameh Mosque of Gonabad is related to Khwarazmian dynasty and is located in Gonabad.

=== Qanats of Gonabad ===
The Qanats of Ghasabeh, also called Kariz Kai Khosrow, is one of the world's oldest and largest networks of qanats (underground aqueducts). Built between 700 and 500 BCE by the Achaemenid Empire in what is now Gonabad, Razavi Khorasan Province, Iran, the complex contains 427 water wells with a total length of 33,113 metres (20.575 mi). The site was first added to UNESCO's list of tentative World Heritage Sites in 2007, then officially inscribed in 2016, collectively with several other qanats, as "The Persian Qanat".

== Education and culture ==
=== Higher education ===
Gonabad can be considered the most student city in Khorasan Razavi province. According to unofficial statistics, about 30% of the city's population (equivalent to about 12,000 people) are indigenous and non-indigenous students. The most important higher education centers in Gonabad:

- Gonabad University of Medical Sciences
- Islamic Azad University, Gonabad Branch
- University of Gonabad

== Gallery ==
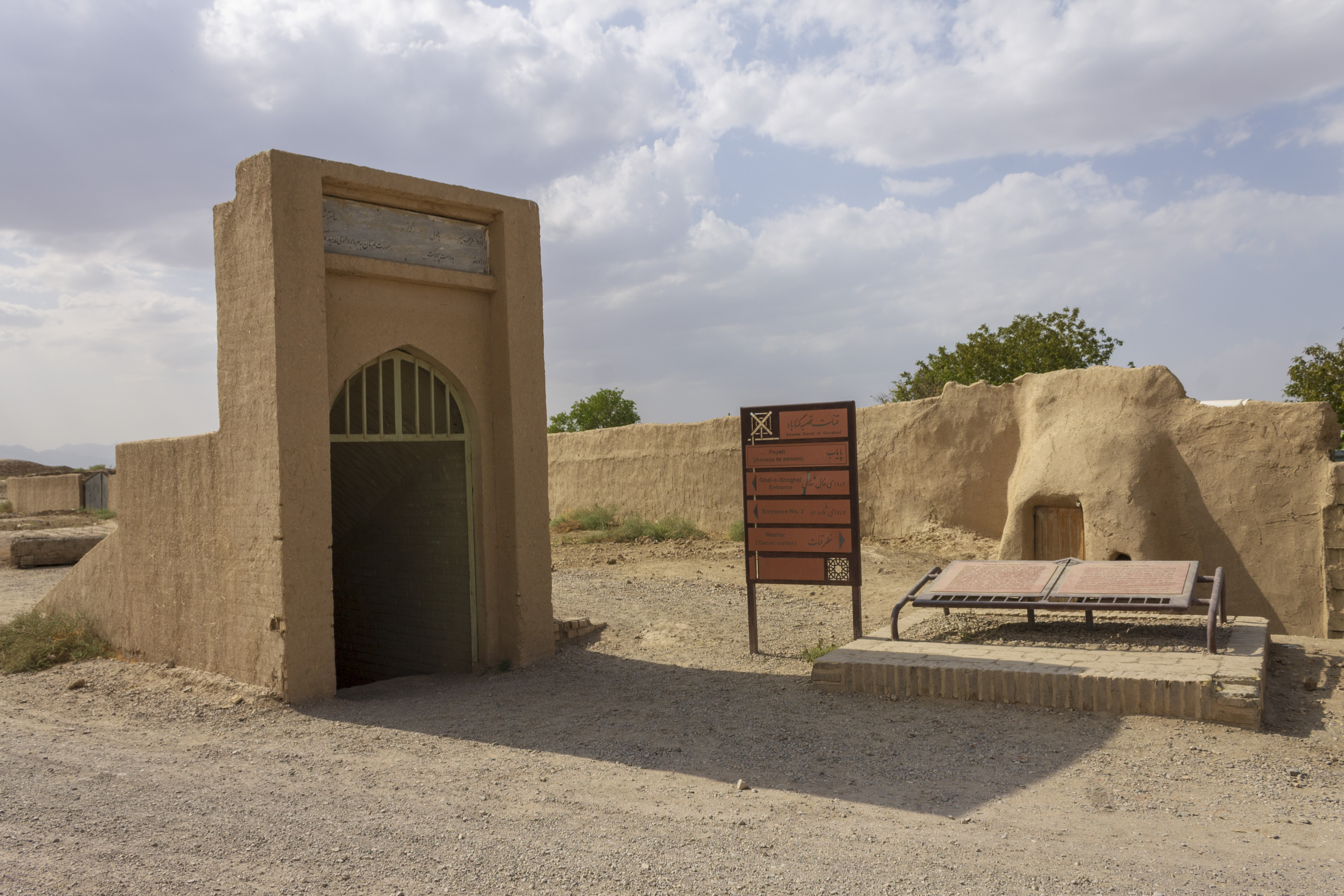
Qanats of Gonabad

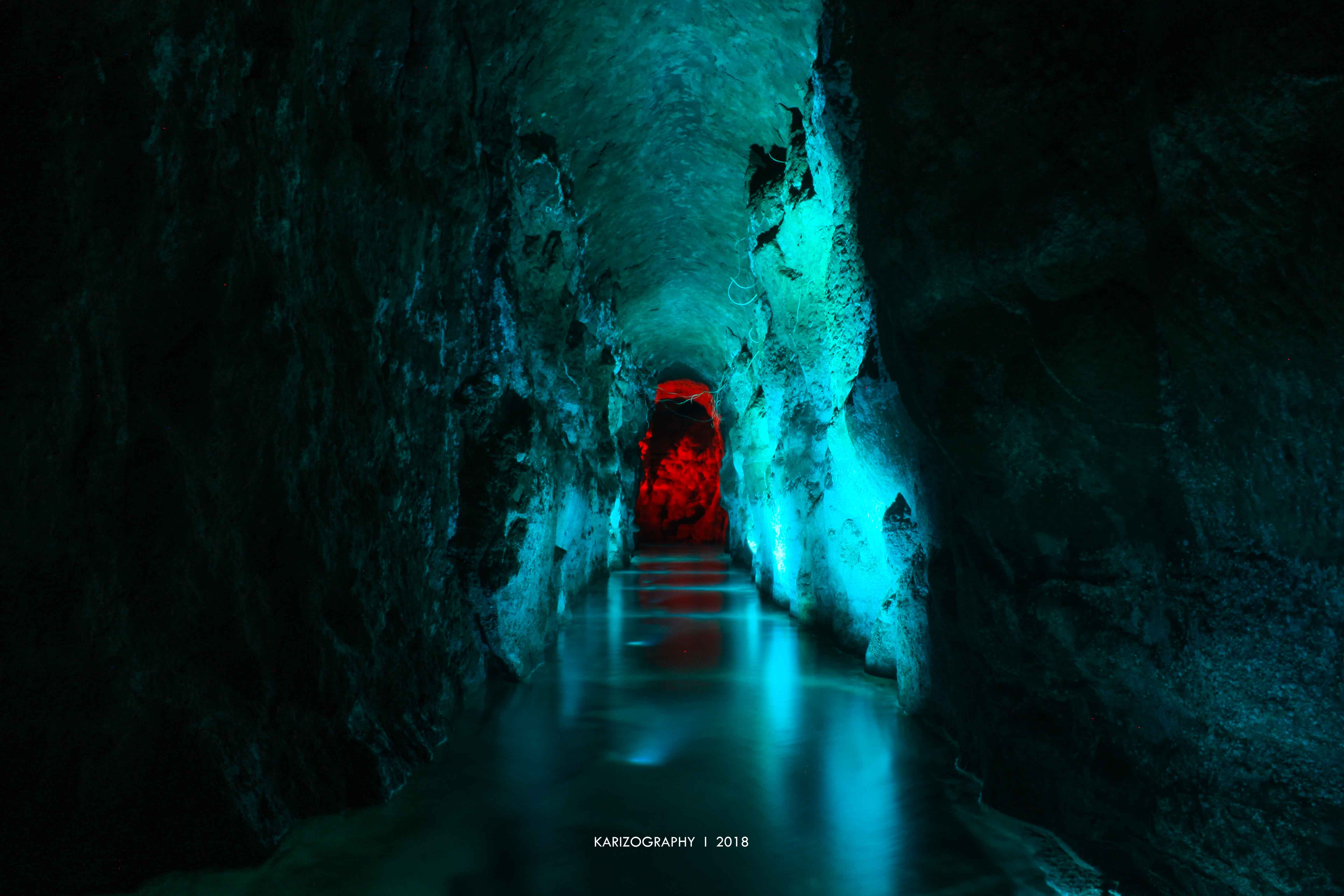
Qanats of Gonabad

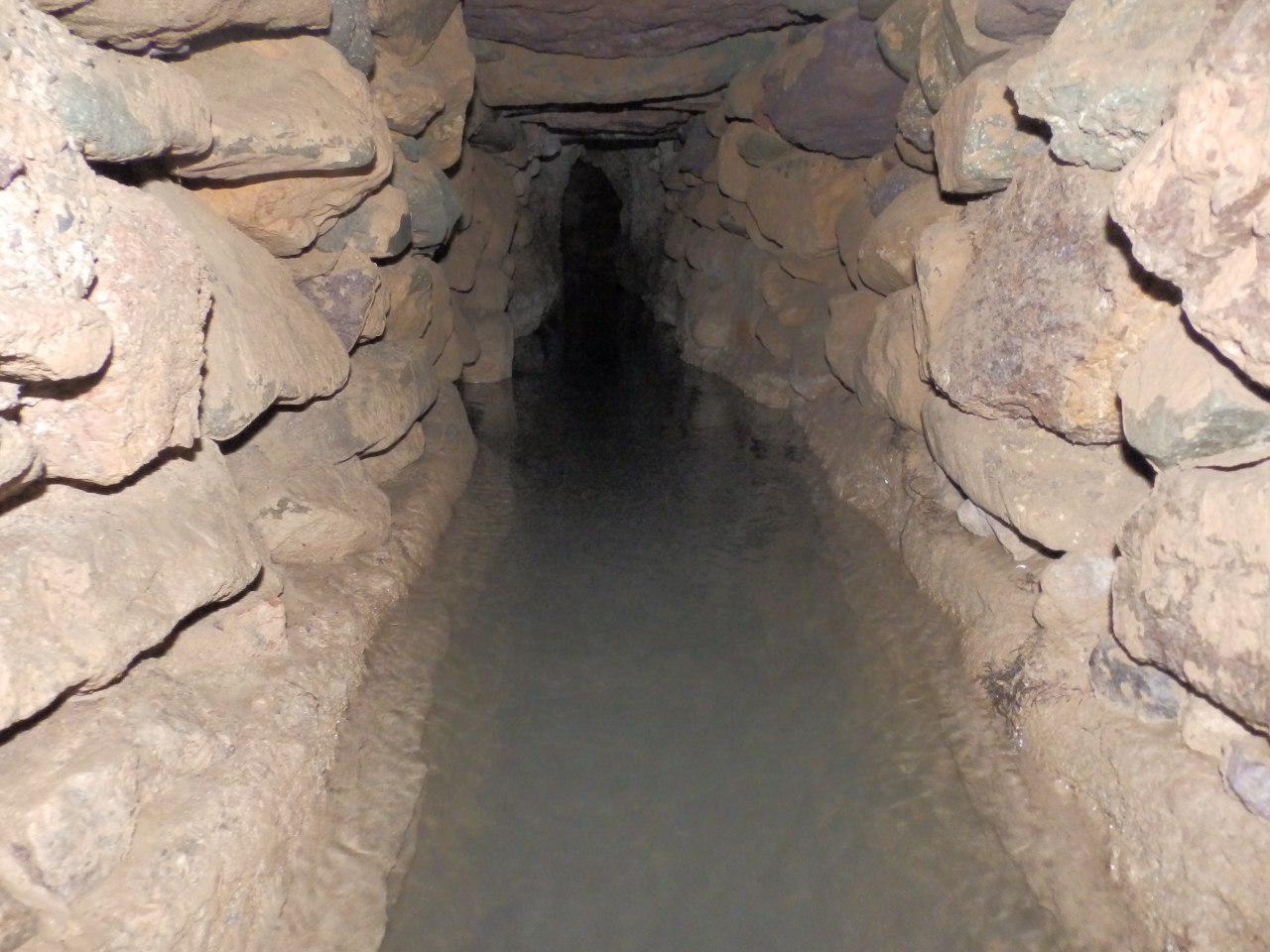
Qanats of Gonabad

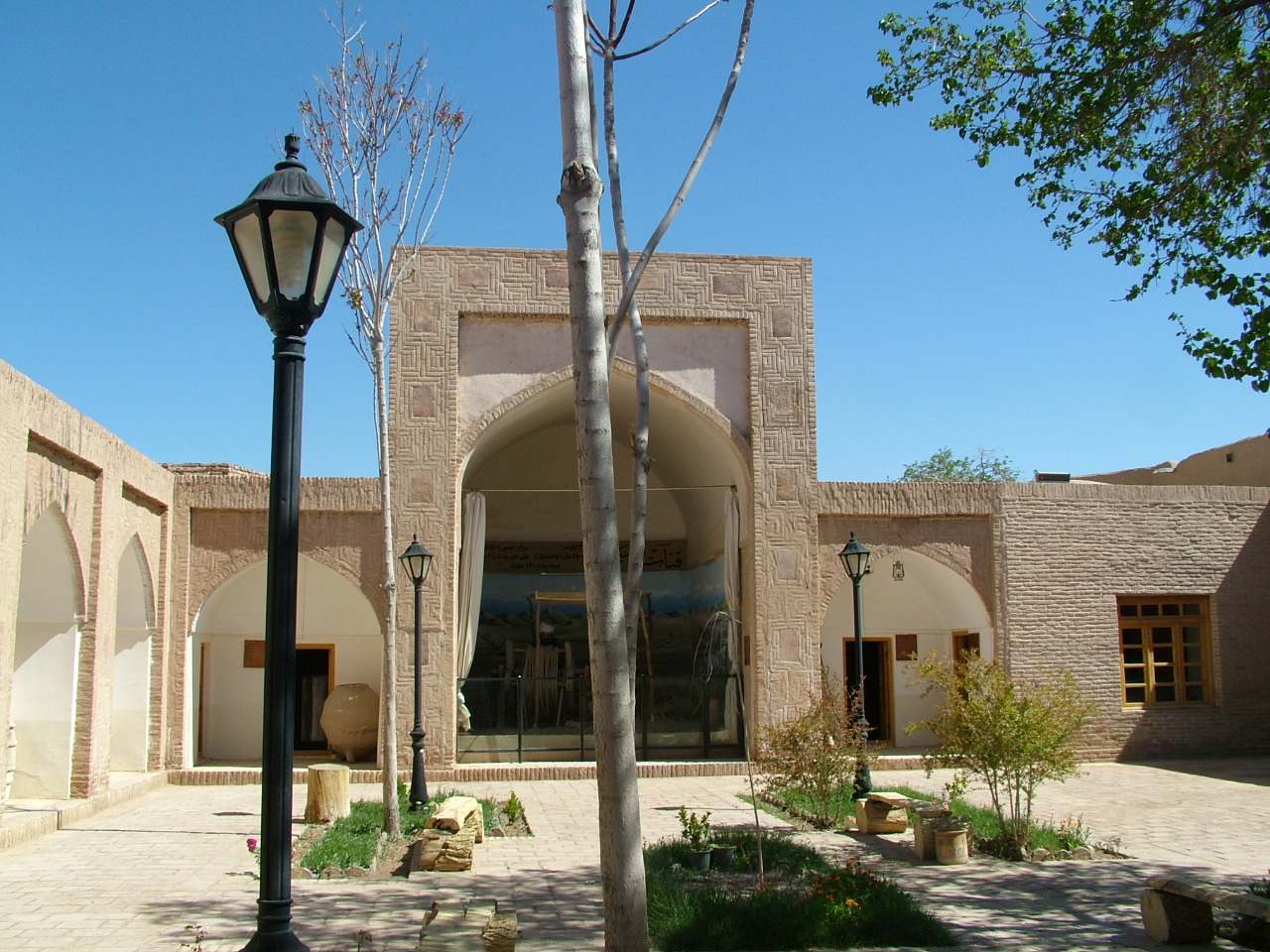
Anthropological Museum

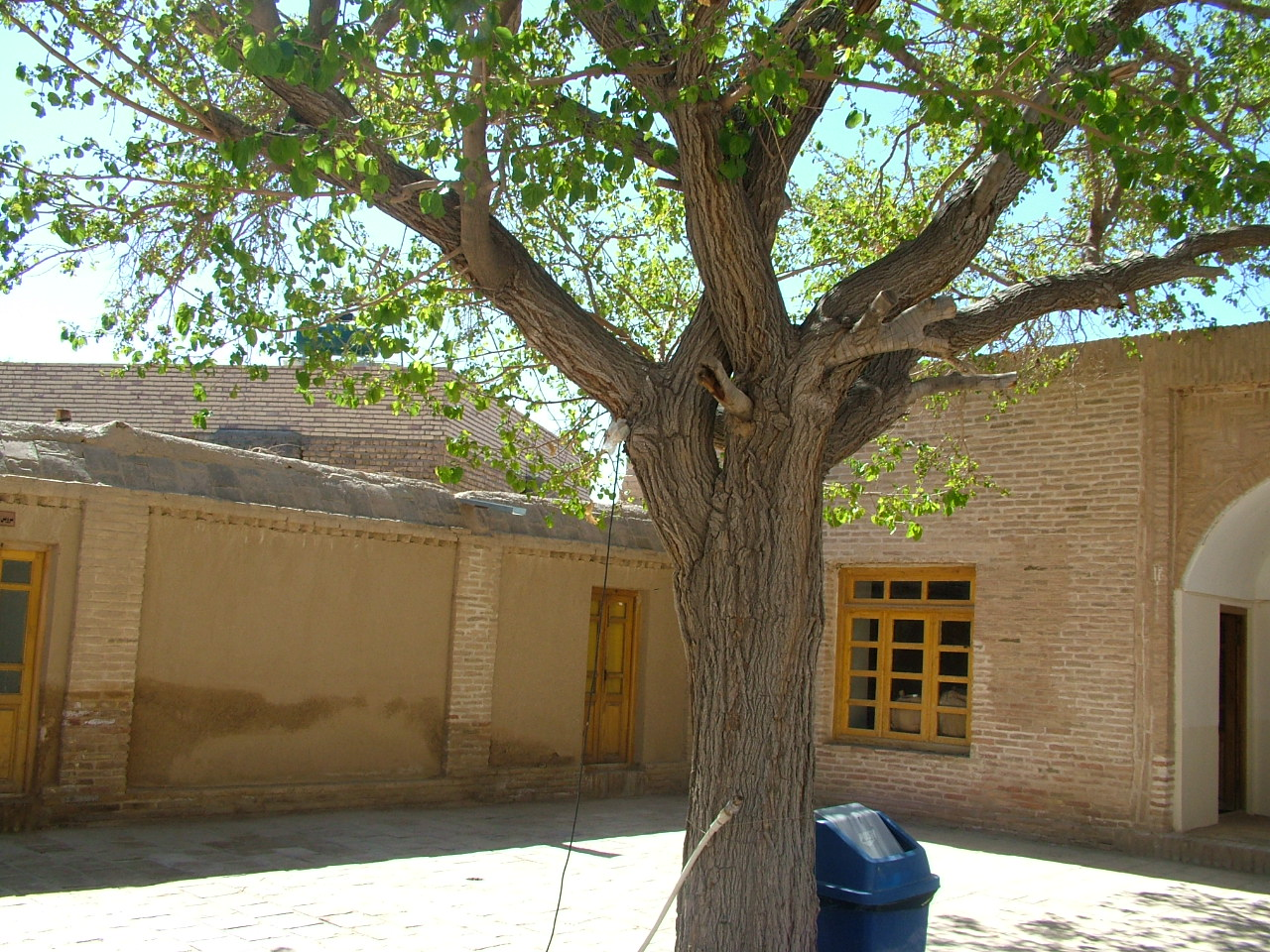
Anthropological Museum

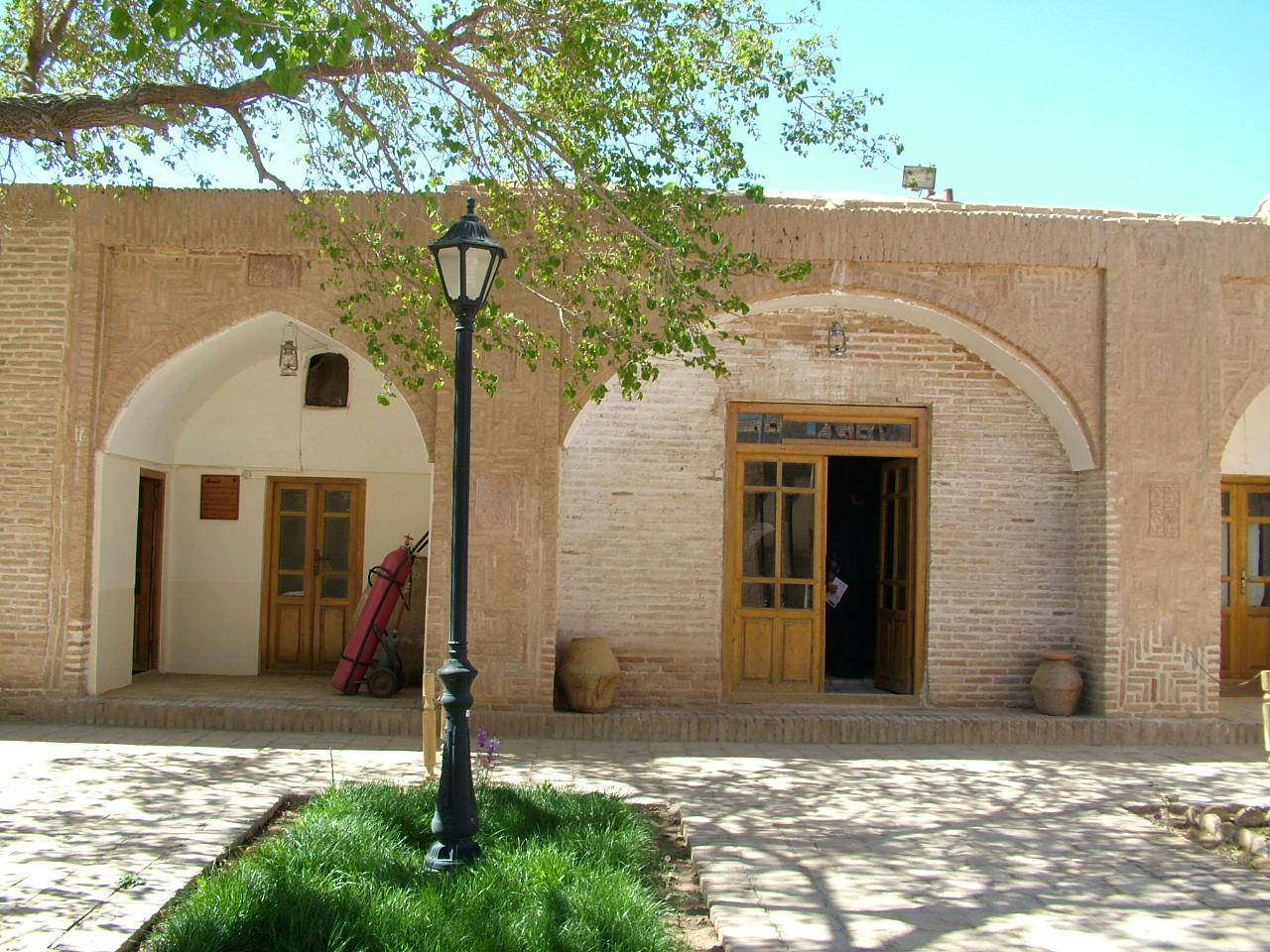
Anthropological Museum

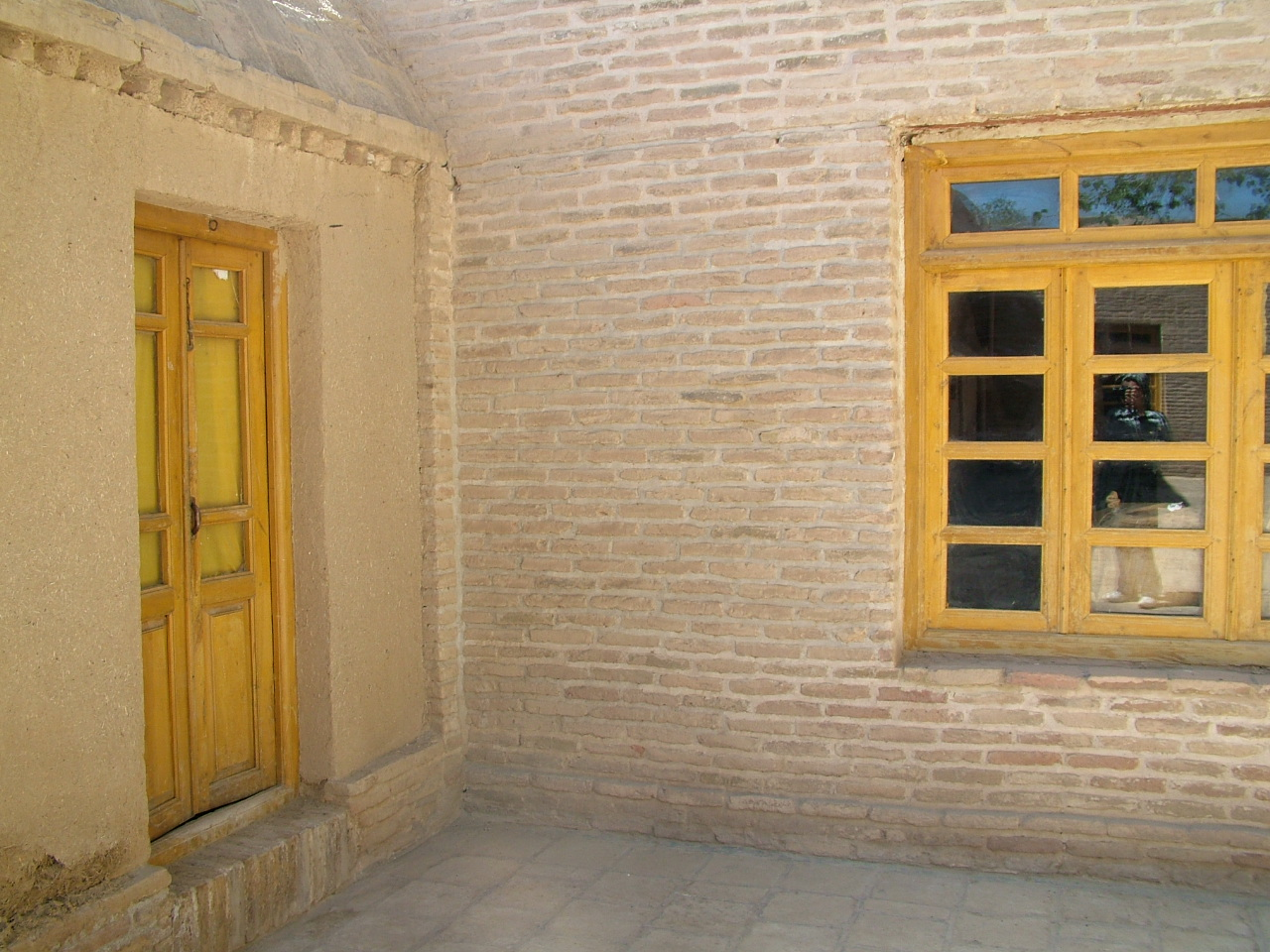
Anthropological Museum

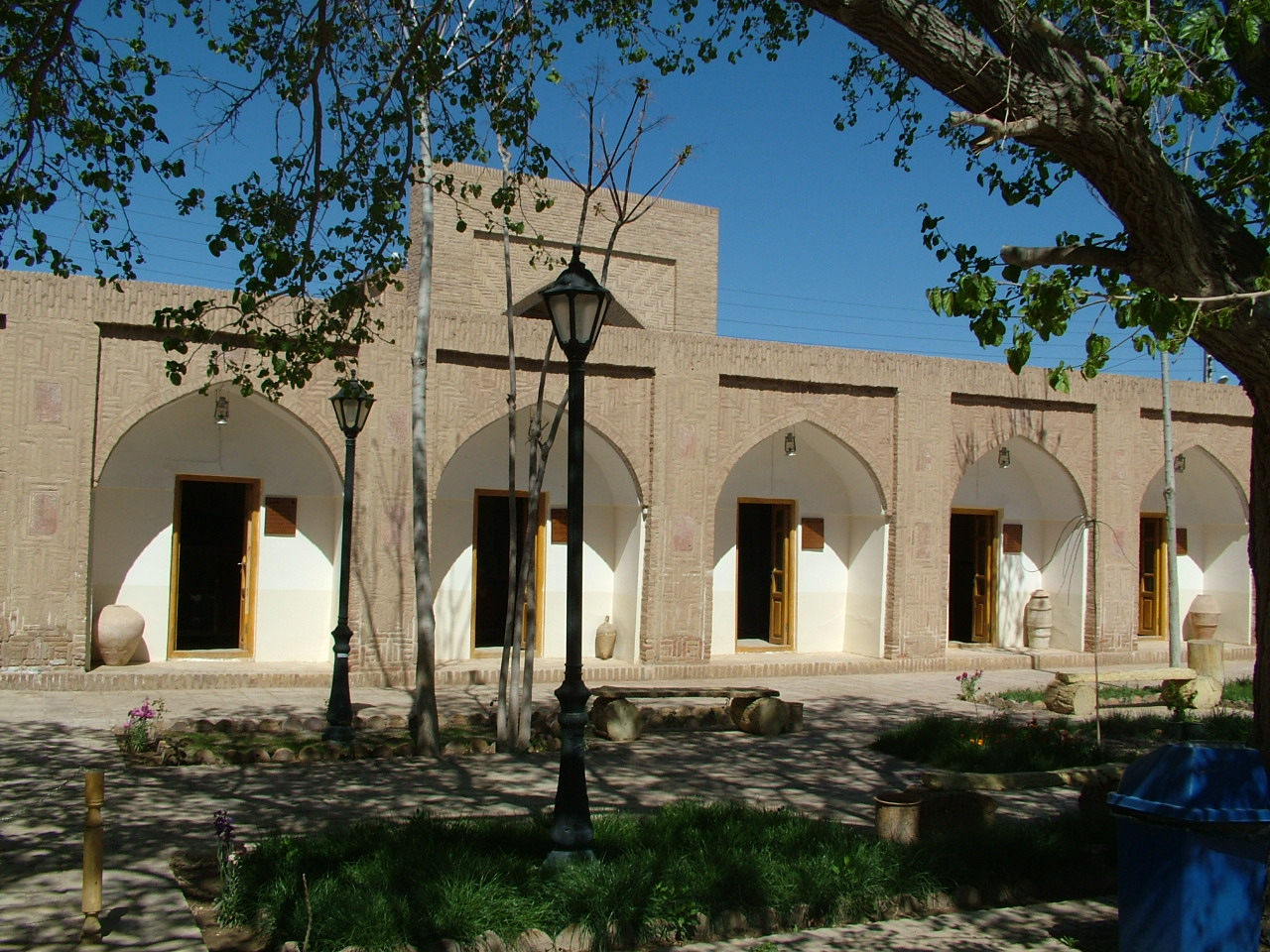
Anthropological Museum

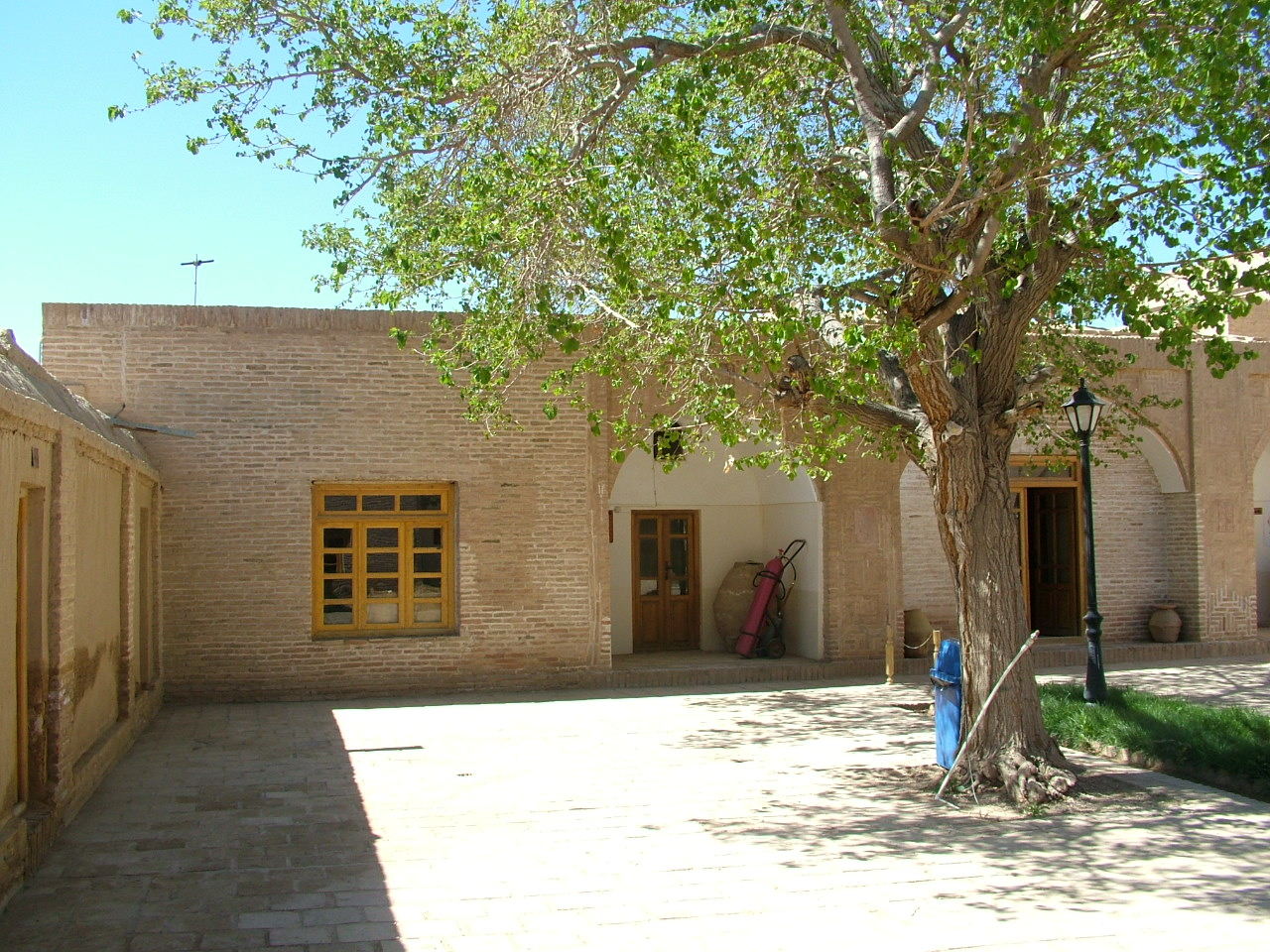
Anthropological Museum

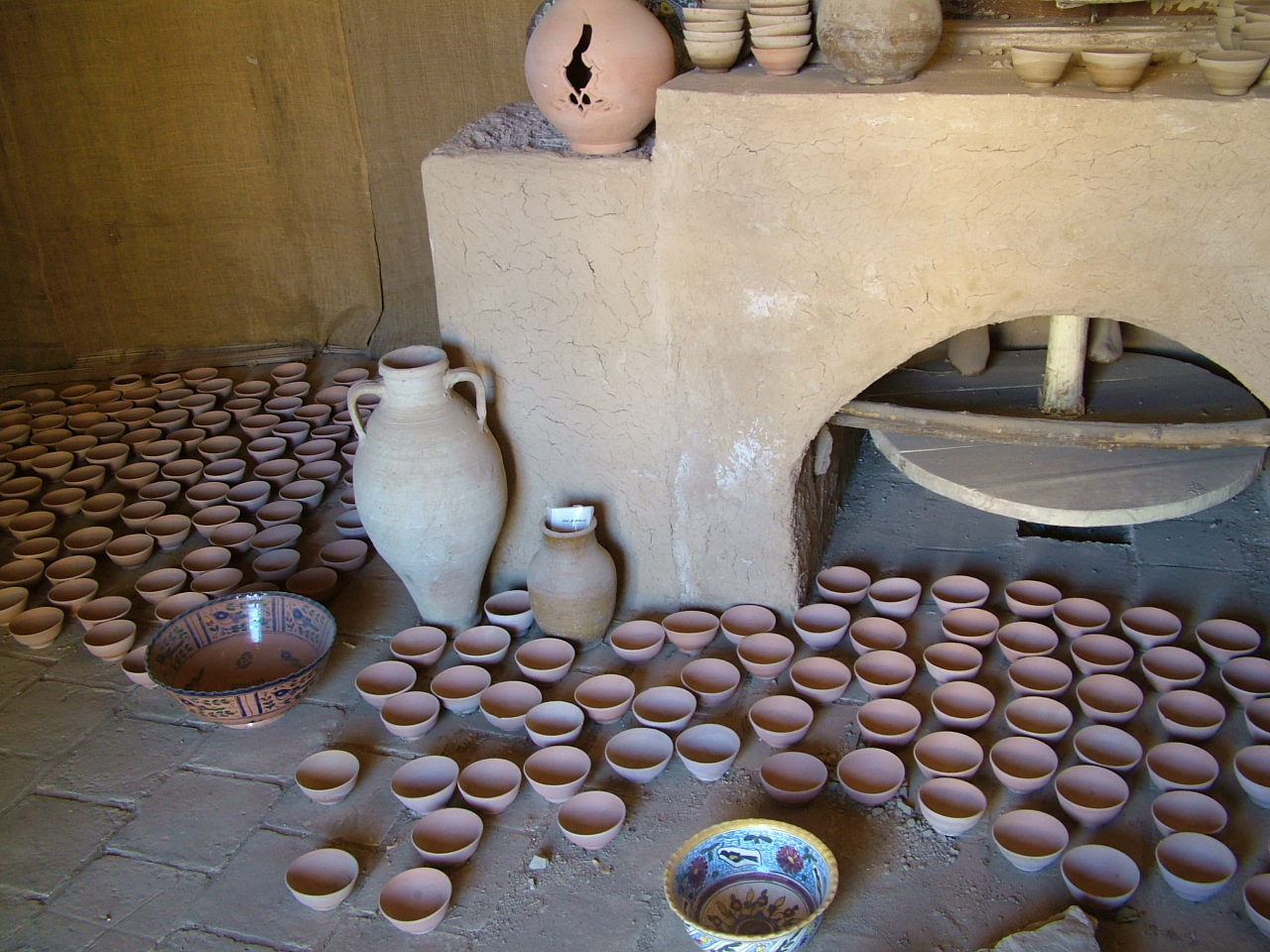
Anthropological Museum

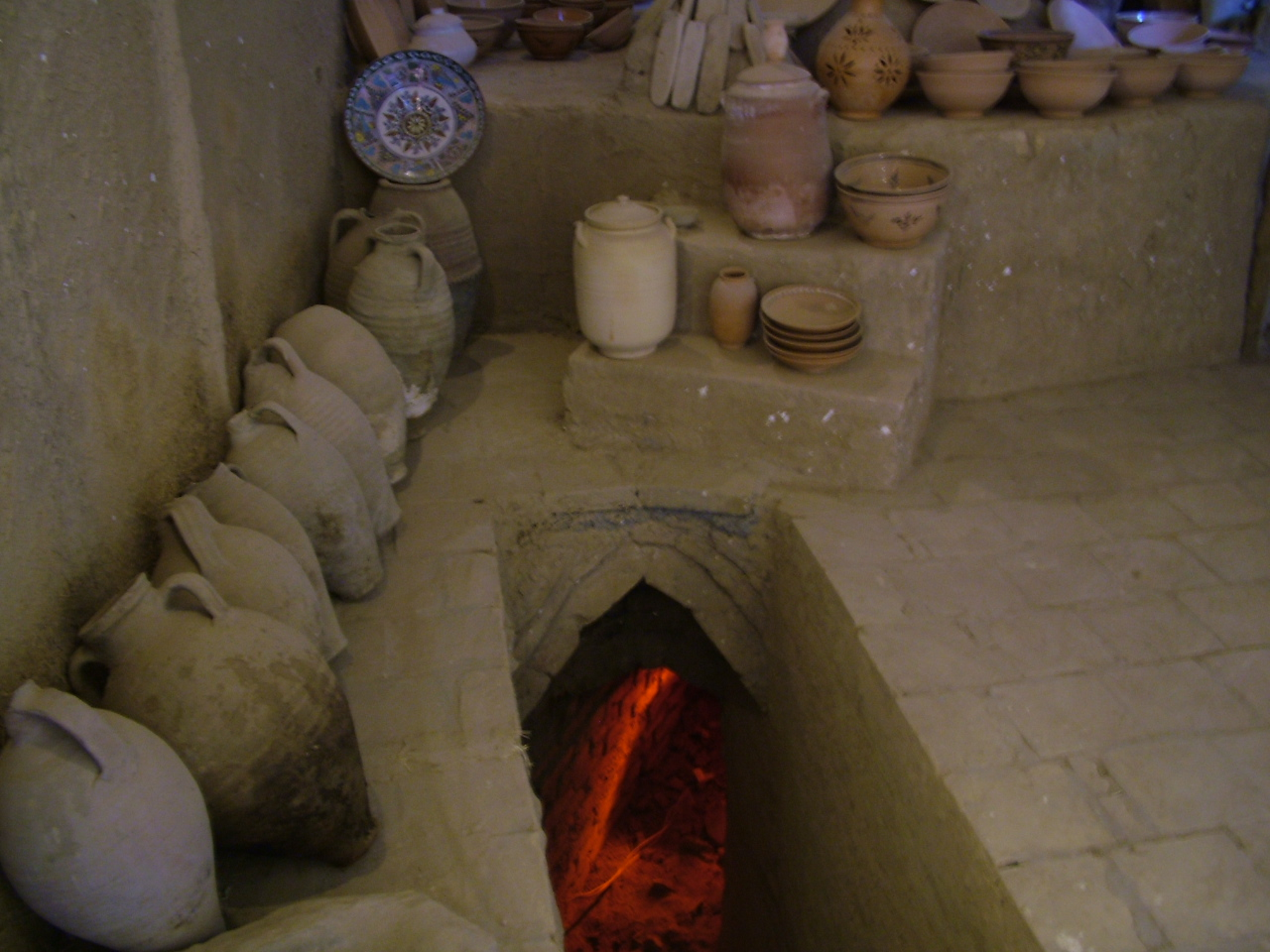
Anthropological Museum

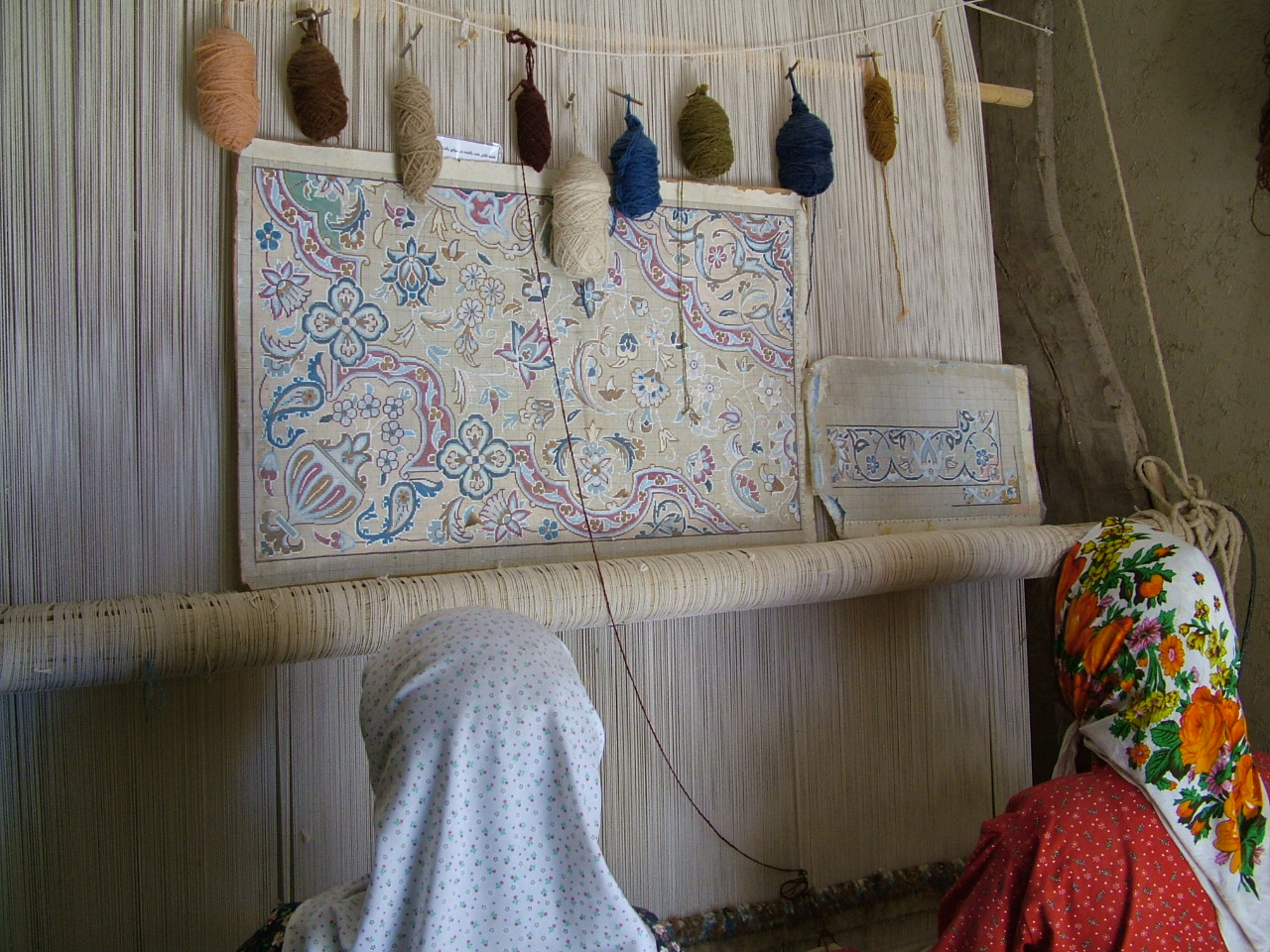
Anthropological Museum

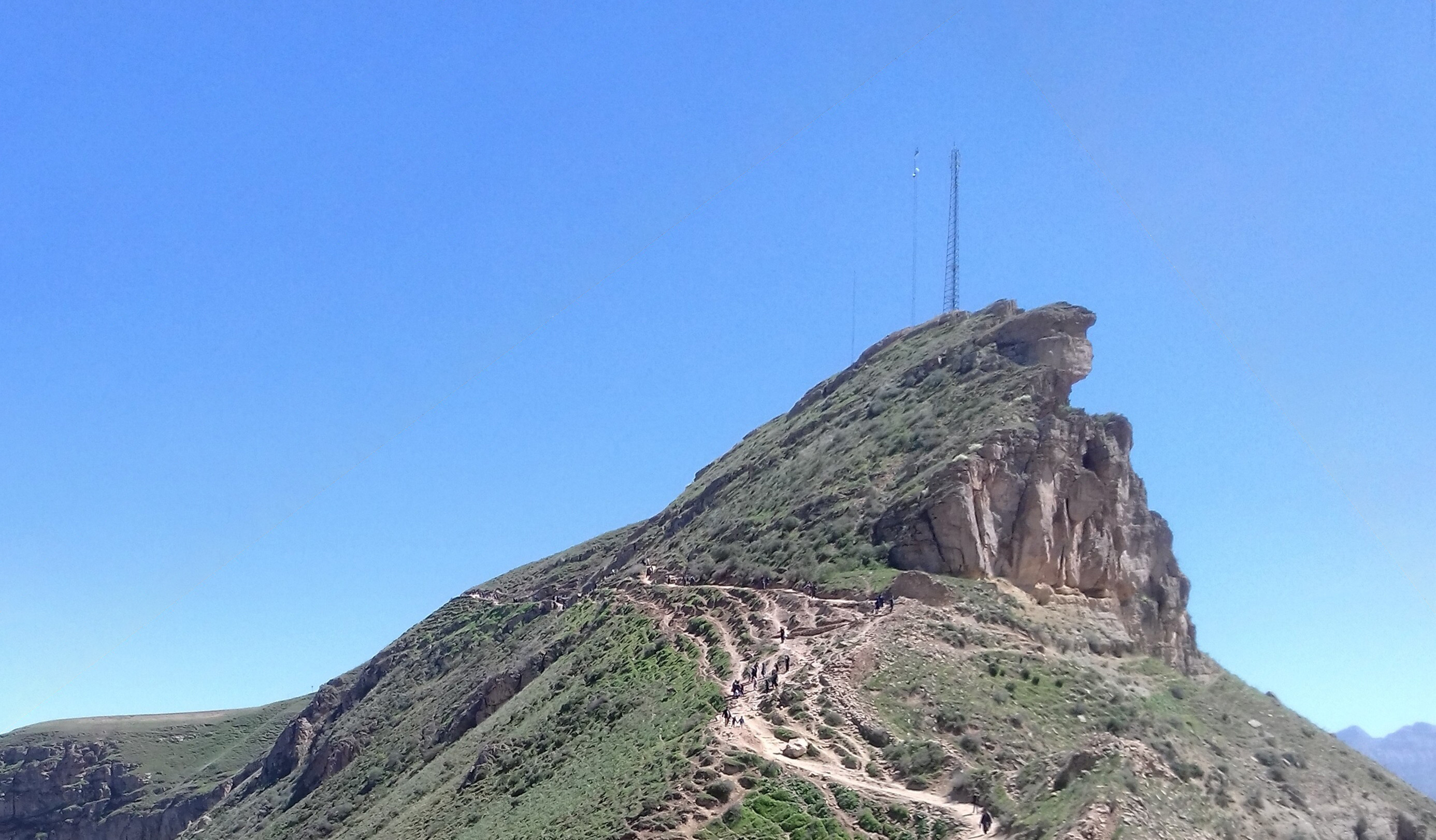
Forud Castle

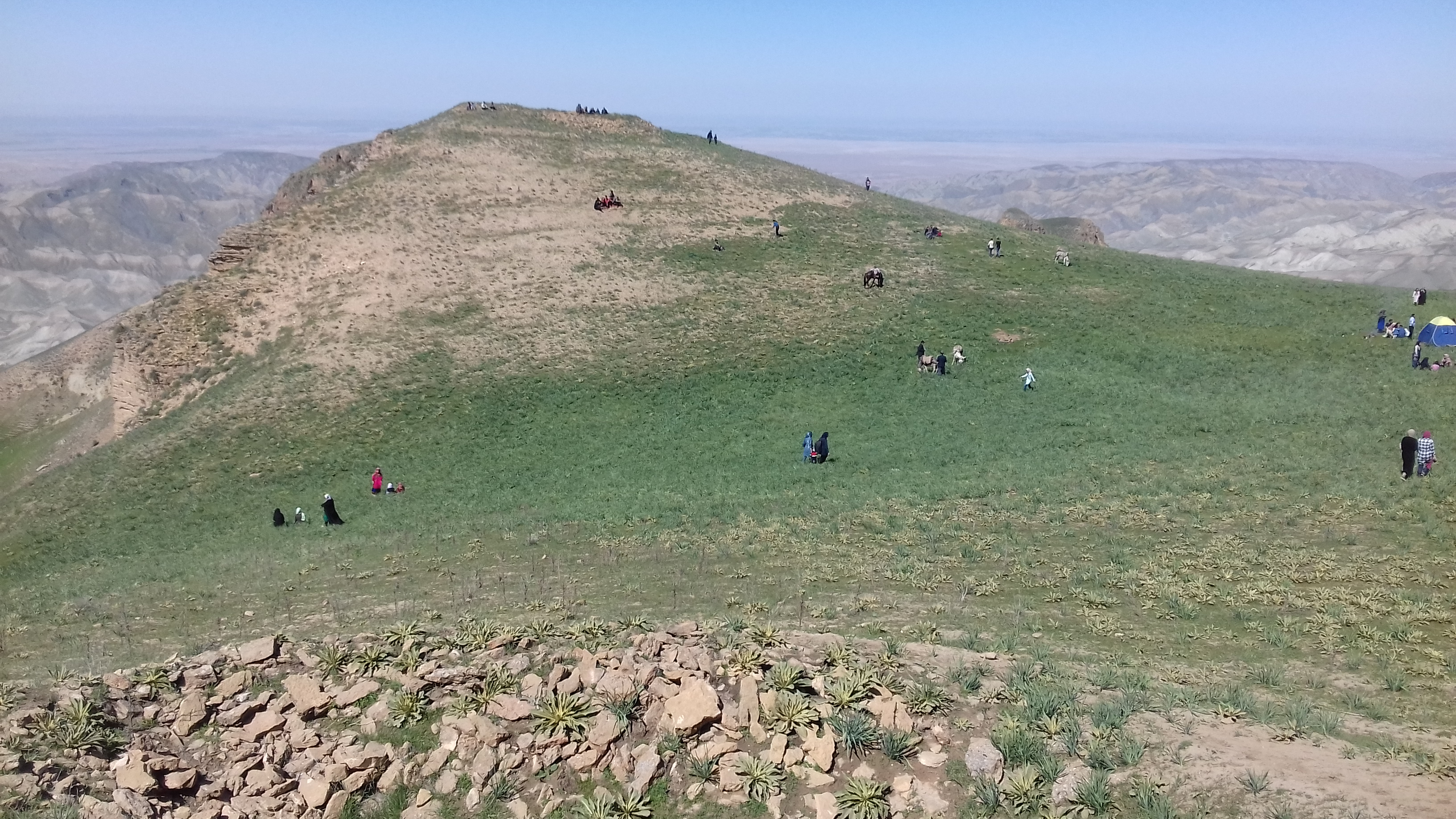
Forud Castle

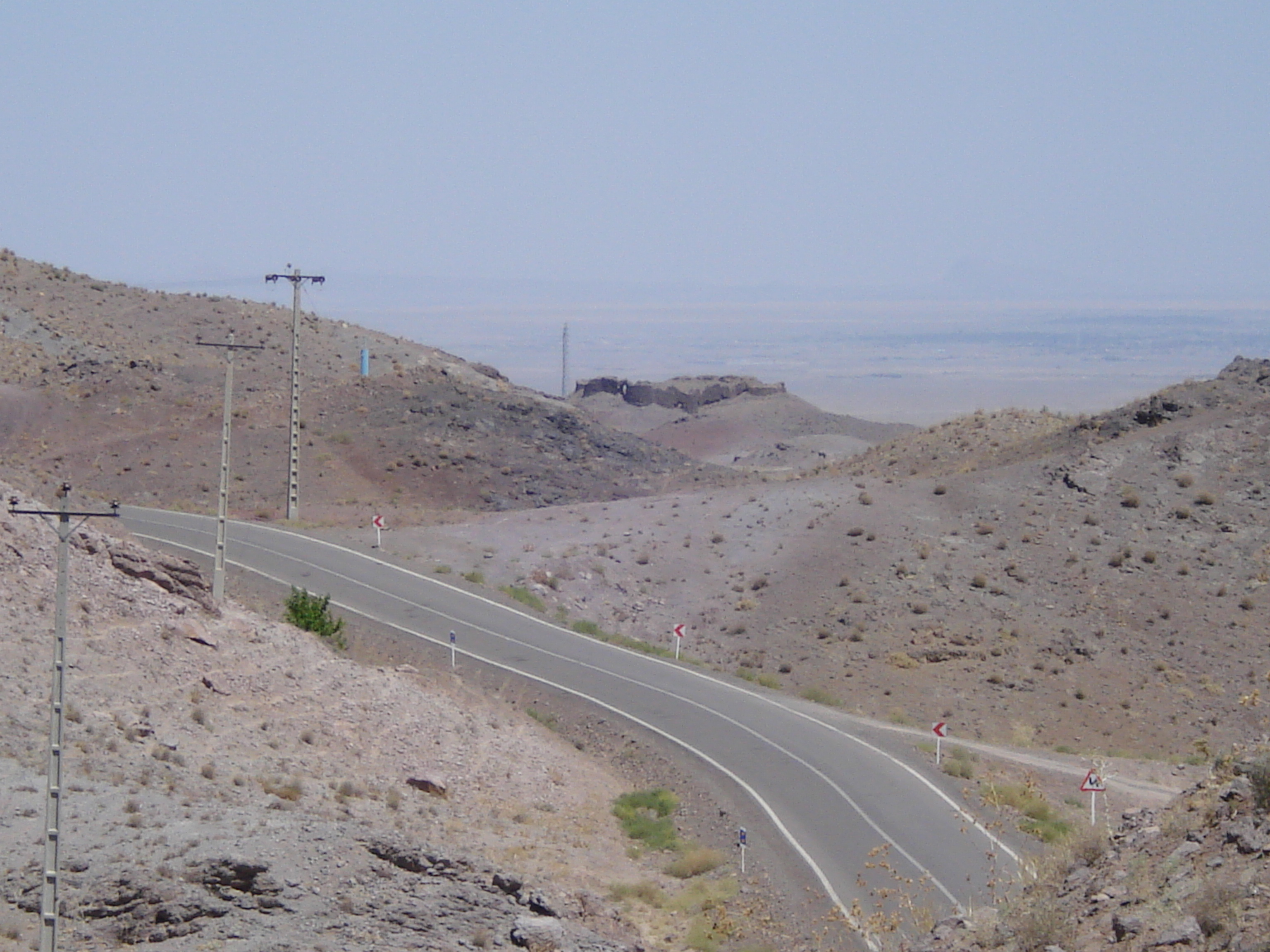
Zibad Castle

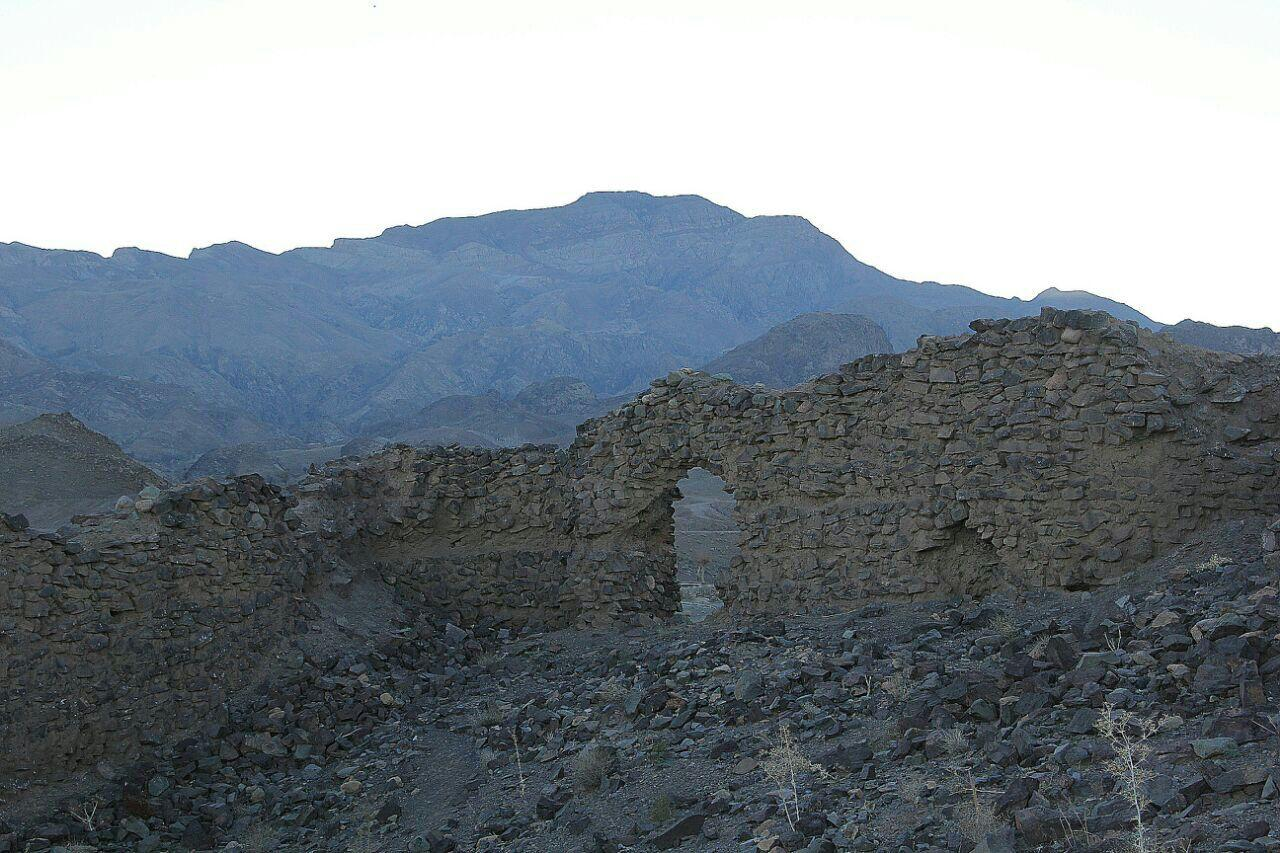
Zibad Castle

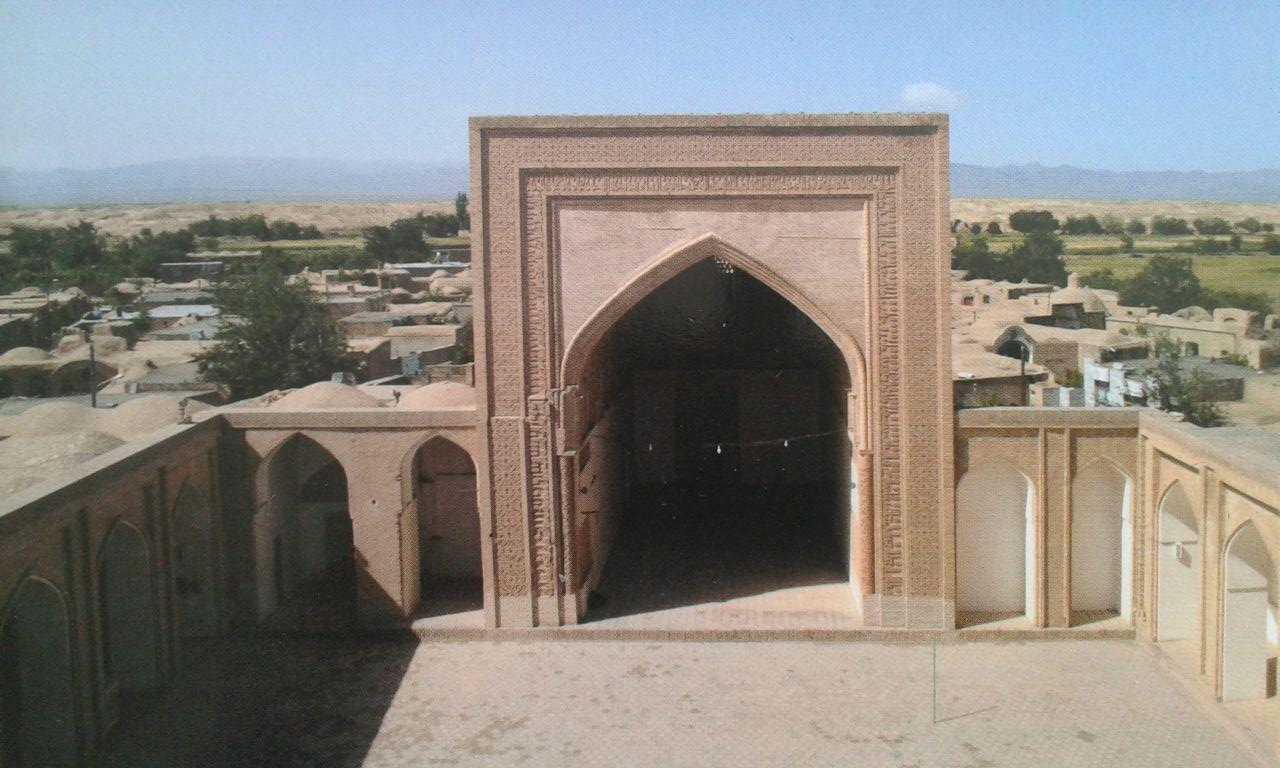
Jameh Mosque of Gonabad

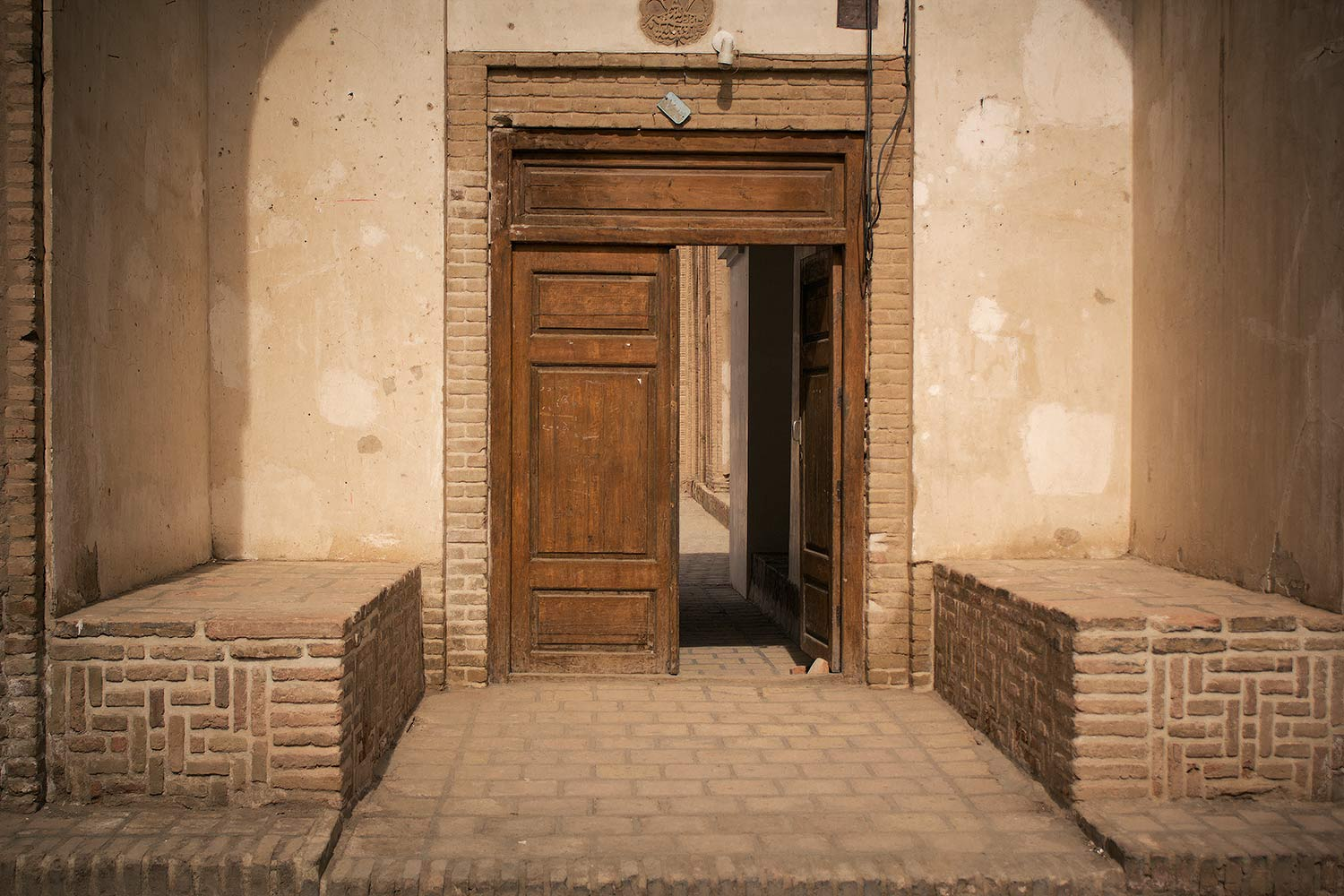
Jameh Mosque of Gonabad
