= Rushnavand, Razavi Khorasan =

City in Razavi Khorasan province, Iran

Rushnavand Persian: روشناوند
- City
- Location within Iran
- Coordinates: 34°27′57″N 58°54′39″E
- Country: Iran
- Province: Razavi Khorasan
- County: Gonabad
- District: Central
- Established as a city: 2020

Population (2016)
  - Total: 3,272
- Time zone: UTC+3:30 (IRST)

Rushnavand (Persian: روشناوند) (Note: Also romanized as Rowshanāvand, Rūshnāvand, and Rushnāwand; also known as Rowsanāvand and Rūshanābād) is a city in the Central District of Gonabad County, Razavi Khorasan province, Iran.

== Demographics ==
=== Population ===
At the time of the 2006 National Census, Rushnavand's population was 2,770 in 675 households, when it was a village in Pas Kalut Rural District. The following census in 2011 counted 3,551 people in 908 households. The 2016 census measured the population of the village as 3,272 people in 921 households, the most populous in its rural district.

Rushnavand was converted to a city in 2020.
