= Rowshanabad, Kohgiluyeh and Boyer-Ahmad =

Rowshanabad روشن اباد
- Village
- Location within Iran
- Coordinates: 30°42′40″N 50°31′27″E
- Country: Iran
- Province: Kohgiluyeh and Boyer-Ahmad
- County: Kohgiluyeh
- Bakhsh: Central
- Rural District: Dehdasht-e Gharbi

Population (2006)
  - Total: 396
- Time zone: UTC+3:30 (IRST)
  - Summer (DST): UTC+4:30 (IRDT)

Rowshanabad (Persian: روشن اباد, also Romanized as Rowshanābād; also known as Rashanābād and Roshanābād) is a village in Dehdasht-e Gharbi Rural District, in the Central District of Kohgiluyeh County, Kohgiluyeh and Boyer-Ahmad Province, Iran. At the 2006 census, its population was 396, in 60 families.
