= Rowshanavand, Birjand =

Village in South Khorasan province, Iran

Rowshanavand Persian: روشناوند
- Village
- Location within Iran
- Coordinates: 33°12′03″N 59°11′31″E
- Country: Iran
- Province: South Khorasan
- County: Birjand
- District: Central
- Rural District: Fasharud

Population (2016)
  - Total: 113
- Time zone: UTC+3:30 (IRST)

Rowshanavand (Persian: روشناوند) (Note: Also romanized as Rowshanāvand and Rūshnāvand; also known as Roshanābad, Roshanābād, and Rowshanābād) is a village in Fasharud Rural District of the Central District in Birjand County, South Khorasan province, Iran.

== Demographics ==
=== Population ===
At the time of the 2006 National Census, the village's population was 197 in 79 households. The following census in 2011 counted 76 people in 41 households. The 2016 census measured the population of the village as 113 people in 54 households.
