= Howmeh Rural District (Gonabad County) =

Rural district in Razavi Khorasan province, Iran

Howmeh Rural District Persian: دهستان حومه
- Rural District
- Location within Iran
- Coordinates: 34°30′N 58°38′E
- Country: Iran
- Province: Razavi Khorasan
- County: Gonabad
- District: Central
- Established: 1987
- Capital: Biland

Population (2016)
  - Total: 20,989
- Time zone: UTC+3:30 (IRST)

Howmeh Rural District (Persian: دهستان حومه) is in the Central District of Gonabad County, Razavi Khorasan province, Iran. Its capital is the village of Biland.

== Demographics ==
=== Population ===
At the time of the 2006 National Census, the rural district's population was 16,701 in 4,732 households. There were 18,727 inhabitants in 5,717 households at the following census of 2011. The 2016 census measured the population of the rural district as 20,989 in 6,470 households. The most populous of its 103 villages was Biland, with 5,004 people.

=== Other villages in the rural district ===
- Bagh-e Asiya
- Behabad
- Dowlui
- Mend
- Qanbarabad
- Quzhd
- Rahn
