= Central District (Gonabad County) =

District in Razavi Khorasan province, Iran

Central District (Gonabad County) Persian: بخش مرکزی شهرستان گناباد
- District
- Location within Iran
- Coordinates: 34°28′N 58°56′E
- Country: Iran
- Province: Razavi Khorasan
- County: Gonabad
- Capital: Gonabad

Population (2016)
  - Total: 76,427
- Time zone: UTC+3:30 (IRST)

The Central District of Gonabad County (Persian: بخش مرکزی شهرستان گناباد) is in Razavi Khorasan province, Iran. Its capital is the city of Gonabad.

== History ==
The village of Rushnavand was converted to a city in 2020.

== Demographics ==
=== Population ===
At the time of the 2006 National Census, the district's population was 64,849 in 18,169 households. The following census in 2011 counted 69,773 people in 20,322 households. The 2016 census measured the population of the district as 76,427 inhabitants in 22,977 households.

=== Administrative divisions ===
Central District (Gonabad County) Population
Administrative Divisions	2006	2011	2016
Howmeh RD	16,701	18,727	20,989
Pas Kalut RD	8,762	9,331	9,164
Bidokht (city)	4,823	5,348	5,501
Gonabad (city)	34,563	36,367	40,773
Rushnavand (city) (Note: Became a city after the 2016 census)			
Total	64,849	69,773	76,427
RD = Rural District
