= Nuk =

Nuk or NUK may refer to:

== Places ==
- Nuk, Bajestan, a village in Bajestan County, Razavi Khorasan Province, Iran
- Nuk, Rashtkhvar, a village in Rashtkhvar County, Razavi Khorasan Province, Iran
- Nuk, Birjand, a village in South Khorasan Province, Iran
- Nuk, Sarbisheh, a village in South Khorasan Province, Iran
- Nuk, Tabas, a village in South Khorasan Province, Iran

== People ==
- DeAndre Hopkins (born 1992), American football player and coach whose nickname is "Nuk"
- Nuk Korako (born 1954), New Zealand politician
- PGF Nuk (born 2001 or 2002), American rapper known for the song "Waddup"

== Other uses ==
- NUK (brand), a German brand of baby products
- Nuk language, spoken in Papua New Guinea
- nuk, ISO 639-3 code for the Nuu-chah-nulth language of British Columbia, Canada
- National and University Library of Slovenia (Slovene: Narodna in univerzitetna knjižnica)
- National University of Kaohsiung, Kaohsiung City, Taiwan
- Norwegian Air UK, a British airline
- Nuuk Idraetslag, also known as NÛK, a sports club based in Nuuk, Greenland
- Nuk, a fictional wolf in Balto II: Wolf Quest; see List of Balto characters

== See also ==
- Nuuk, the capital of Greenland
- Nuq (disambiguation)
- Nuc (disambiguation)
- Nuck (disambiguation)
