= Fakhrabad, Bajestan =

Village in Razavi Khorasan province, Iran

Fakhrabad Persian: فخراباد
- Village
- Location within Iran
- Coordinates: 34°44′28″N 58°03′16″E
- Country: Iran
- Province: Razavi Khorasan
- County: Bajestan
- District: Yunesi
- Rural District: Sar Daq

Population (2016)
  - Total: 2,764
- Time zone: UTC+3:30 (IRST)

Fakhrabad (Persian: فخراباد) (Note: Also romanized as Fakhrābād; also known as Kalāteh-ye Fakhrābād) is a village in Sar Daq Rural District of Yunesi District in Bajestan County, Razavi Khorasan province, Iran.

== Demographics ==
=== Population ===
At the time of the 2006 National Census, the village's population was 1,672 in 429 households, when it was in Yunesi Rural District of the former Bajestan District in Gonabad County. The following census in 2011 counted 1,977 people in 542 households, by which time the district had been separated from the county in the establishment of Bajestan County. The rural district was transferred to the new Yunesi District, and Fakhrabad was transferred to Sar Daq Rural District created in the same district. The 2016 census measured the population of the village as 2,764 people in 836 households, the most populous in its rural district.
