= Mansuri, Razavi Khorasan =

Village in Razavi Khorasan province, Iran

Mansuri Persian: منصوري
- Village
- Location within Iran
- Coordinates: 34°43′17″N 57°59′18″E
- Country: Iran
- Province: Razavi Khorasan
- County: Bajestan
- District: Yunesi
- Rural District: Sar Daq

Population (2016)
  - Total: 577
- Time zone: UTC+3:30 (IRST)

Mansuri (Persian: منصوري) (Note: Also romanized as Manşūrī) is a village in Sar Daq Rural District of Yunesi District in Bajestan County, Razavi Khorasan province, Iran.

== Demographics ==
=== Population ===
At the time of the 2006 National Census, the village's population was 582 in 125 households, when it was in Yunesi Rural District of the former Bajestan District in Gonabad County. The following census in 2011 counted 605 people in 156 households, by which time the district had been separated from the county in the establishment of Bajestan County. The rural district was transferred to the new Yunesi District, and the village was transferred to Sar Daq Rural District created in the same district. The 2016 census measured the population of the village as 577 people in 179 households.
