= Ebrahimabad, Bajestan =

Village in Razavi Khorasan province, Iran

Ebrahimabad Persian: ابراهيم اباد
- Village
- Location within Iran
- Coordinates: 34°42′08″N 57°57′27″E
- Country: Iran
- Province: Razavi Khorasan
- County: Bajestan
- District: Yunesi
- Rural District: Sar Daq

Population (2016)
  - Total: 51
- Time zone: UTC+3:30 (IRST)

Ebrahimabad (Persian: ابراهيم اباد) (Note: Also romanized as Ebrāhīmābād) is a village in Sar Daq Rural District of Yunesi District in Bajestan County, Razavi Khorasan province, Iran.

== Demographics ==
=== Population ===
At the time of the 2006 National Census, the village's population was 92 in 22 households, when it was in Yunesi Rural District of the former Bajestan District in Gonabad County. The following census in 2011 counted 70 people in 19 households, by which time the district had been separated from the county in the establishment of Bajestan County. The rural district was transferred to the new Yunesi District, and the village was transferred to Sar Daq Rural District created in the same district. The 2016 census measured the population of the village as 51 people in 20 households.
