= Qasemabad, Bajestan =

Village in Razavi Khorasan province, Iran

Qasemabad Persian: قاسم اباد
- Village
- Location within Iran
- Coordinates: 34°31′05″N 57°51′05″E
- Country: Iran
- Province: Razavi Khorasan
- County: Bajestan
- District: Central
- Rural District: Bajestan

Population (2016)
  - Total: 617
- Time zone: UTC+3:30 (IRST)

Qasemabad (Persian: قاسم اباد) (Note: Also romanized as Qāsemābād) is a village in Bajestan Rural District of the Central District in Bajestan County, Razavi Khorasan province, Iran.

== Demographics ==
=== Population ===
At the time of the 2006 National Census, the village's population was 589 in 133 households, when it was in the former Bajestan District of Gonabad County. The following census in 2011 counted 645 people in 172 households, by which time the district had been separated from the county in the establishment of Bajestan County, and the rural district was transferred to the new Central District. The 2016 census measured the population of the village as 617 people in 179 households.
