= Chekkeh Ab =

Village in Razavi Khorasan province, Iran

Chekkeh Ab Persian: چكه اب
- Village
- Location within Iran
- Country: Iran
- Province: Razavi Khorasan
- County: Bajestan
- District: Central
- Rural District: Bajestan

Population (2016)
  - Total: Below reporting threshold
- Time zone: UTC+3:30 (IRST)

Chekkeh Ab (Persian: چكه اب) (Note: Also romanized as Chekkeh Āb; also known as Chek Āb) is a village in Bajestan Rural District of the Central District in Bajestan County, Razavi Khorasan province, Iran.

== Demographics ==
=== Population ===
At the time of the 2006 National Census, the village's population was 22 in six households, when it was in the former Bajestan District of Gonabad County. The village did not appear in the following census of 2011, by which time the district had been separated from the county in the establishment of Bajestan County, and the rural district was transferred to the new Central District. The 2016 census measured the population of the village as below the reporting threshold.
