= Sar Daq =

Village in Razavi Khorasan province, Iran

Sar Daq Persian: سردق
- Village
- Location within Iran
- Coordinates: 34°47′11″N 58°06′53″E
- Country: Iran
- Province: Razavi Khorasan
- County: Bajestan
- District: Yunesi
- Rural District: Sar Daq

Population (2016)
  - Total: 1,524
- Time zone: UTC+3:30 (IRST)

Sar Daq (Persian: سردق) (Note: Also known as Zardak) is a village in, and the capital of, Sar Daq Rural District in Yunesi District of Bajestan County, Razavi Khorasan province, Iran.

== Demographics ==
=== Population ===
At the time of the 2006 National Census, the village's population was 1,163 in 277 households, when it was in Yunesi Rural District of the former Bajestan District in Gonabad County. The following census in 2011 counted 1,254 people in 345 households, by which time the district had been separated from the county in the establishment of Bajestan County. The rural district was transferred to the new Yunesi District, and Sar Daq was transferred to Sar Daq Rural District created in the same district. The 2016 census measured the population of the village as 1,254 people in 345 households.
