= Now Bahar, Bajestan =

Village in Razavi Khorasan province, Iran

Now Bahar Persian: نوبهار
- Village
- Location within Iran
- Coordinates: 34°31′48″N 57°56′54″E
- Country: Iran
- Province: Razavi Khorasan
- County: Bajestan
- District: Central
- Rural District: Bajestan

Population (2016)
  - Total: 19
- Time zone: UTC+3:30 (IRST)

Now Bahar (Persian: نوبهار) (Note: Also romanized as Now Bahār) is a village in Bajestan Rural District of the Central District in Bajestan County, Razavi Khorasan province, Iran.

== Demographics ==
=== Population ===
At the time of the 2006 National Census, the village's population was 40 in 11 households, when it was in the former Bajestan District of Gonabad County. The following census in 2011 counted 33 people in 14 households, by which time the district had been separated from the county in the establishment of Bajestan County, and the rural district was transferred to the new Central District. The 2016 census measured the population of the village as 19 people in seven households.
