= Khush Manzal =

Village in Razavi Khorasan province, Iran

Khush Manzal Persian: خوش منزل
- Village
- Country: Iran
- Province: Razavi Khorasan
- County: Bajestan
- District: Central
- Rural District: Jazin

Population (2016)
  - Total: Below reporting threshold
- Time zone: UTC+3:30 (IRST)

Khush Manzal (Persian: خوش منزل) (Note: Also romanized as Khūsh Manzal) is a village in Jazin Rural District of the Central District in Bajestan County, Razavi Khorasan province, Iran.

== Demographics ==
=== Population ===
At the time of the 2006 National Census, the village's population was 16 in four households, when it was in the former Bajestan District of Gonabad County. The following censuses in 2011 and 2016 counted a population below the reporting threshold, by which time the district had been separated from the county in the establishment of Bajestan County. The rural district was transferred to the new Central District.
