= Kasabad-e Pain =

Village in Razavi Khorasan province, Iran

Kasabad-e Pain Persian: كسابادپائين
- Village
- Country: Iran
- Province: Razavi Khorasan
- County: Bajestan
- District: Central
- Rural District: Jazin

Population (2016)
  - Total: 169
- Time zone: UTC+3:30 (IRST)

Kasabad-e Pain (Persian: كسابادپائين) (Note: Also romanized as Kasābād-e Pā’īn; also known as Āmīrīeh (اميريه) and Āmīrīeh-ye Pā’īn (اميريه پايي)) is a village in Jazin Rural District of the Central District in Bajestan County, Razavi Khorasan province, Iran.

== Demographics ==
=== Population ===
At the time of the 2006 National Census, the village's population was 195 in 53 households, when it was in the former Bajestan District of Gonabad County. The following census in 2011 counted 183 people in 56 households, by which time the district had been separated from the county in the establishment of Bajestan County. The rural district was transferred to the new Central District. The 2016 census measured the population of the village as 169 people in 64 households.
