= Afkan =

Village in Razavi Khorasan province, Iran

Afkan Persian: افكان
- Village
- Location within Iran
- Coordinates: 34°18′52″N 58°17′50″E
- Country: Iran
- Province: Razavi Khorasan
- County: Bajestan
- District: Central
- Rural District: Jazin

Population (2016)
  - Total: 17
- Time zone: UTC+3:30 (IRST)

Afkan (Persian: افكان) (Note: Also romanized as Afkān) is a village in Jazin Rural District of the Central District in Bajestan County, Razavi Khorasan province, Iran.

== Demographics ==
=== Population ===
At the time of the 2006 National Census, the village's population was 26 in eight households, when it was in the former Bajestan District of Gonabad County. The following census in 2011 counted 17 people in nine households, by which time the district had been separated from the county in the establishment of Bajestan County. The rural district was transferred to the new Central District. The 2016 census measured the population of the village as 17 people in seven households.
