= Mazar, Razavi Khorasan =

Village in Razavi Khorasan province, Iran

Mazar Persian: مزار
- Village
- Location within Iran
- Coordinates: 34°29′34″N 58°07′29″E
- Country: Iran
- Province: Razavi Khorasan
- County: Bajestan
- District: Central
- Rural District: Bajestan

Population (2016)
  - Total: 934
- Time zone: UTC+3:30 (IRST)

Mazar (Persian: مزار) (Note: Also romanized as Mazār) is a village in Bajestan Rural District of the Central District in Bajestan County, Razavi Khorasan province, Iran.

== Demographics ==
=== Population ===
At the time of the 2006 National Census, the village's population was 989 in 302 households, when it was in the former Bajestan District of Gonabad County. The following census in 2011 counted 1,035 people in 340 households, by which time the district had been separated from the county in the establishment of Bajestan County, and the rural district was transferred to the new Central District. The 2016 census measured the population of the village as 934 people in 324 households, the most populous in its rural district.
