= Khar Firuzi =

Village in Razavi Khorasan province, Iran

Khar Firuzi Persian: خارفيروزي
- Village
- Location within Iran
- Coordinates: 34°30′13″N 58°22′45″E
- Country: Iran
- Province: Razavi Khorasan
- County: Bajestan
- District: Central
- Rural District: Bajestan

Population (2016)
  - Total: 106
- Time zone: UTC+3:30 (IRST)

Khar Firuzi (Persian: خارفيروزي) (Note: Also romanized as Khār Fīrūzī and Khār-e Fīrūzī; also known as Khār Farajī and Khar Fareji) is a village in Bajestan Rural District of the Central District in Bajestan County, Razavi Khorasan province, Iran.

== Demographics ==
=== Population ===
At the time of the 2006 National Census, the village's population was 154 in 41 households, when it was in the former Bajestan District of Gonabad County. The following census in 2011 counted 115 people in 39 households, by which time the district had been separated from the county in the establishment of Bajestan County, and the rural district was transferred to the new Central District. The 2016 census measured the population of the village as 106 people in 41 households.
