= Rezaiyeh, Razavi Khorasan =

Village in Razavi Khorasan province, Iran

Rezaiyeh Persian: رضائيه
- Village
- Location within Iran
- Coordinates: 34°25′19″N 58°13′27″E
- Country: Iran
- Province: Razavi Khorasan
- County: Bajestan
- District: Central
- Rural District: Jazin

Population (2016)
  - Total: 80
- Time zone: UTC+3:30 (IRST)

Rezaiyeh (Persian: رضائيه) (Note: Also romanized as Reẕā’īyeh; also known as Kalāteh-ye Ḩājj Qorbān and Mīārūd) is a village in Jazin Rural District of the Central District in Bajestan County, Razavi Khorasan province, Iran.

== Demographics ==
=== Population ===
At the time of the 2006 National Census, the village's population was 99 in 29 households, when it was in the former Bajestan District of Gonabad County. The following census in 2011 counted 131 people in 41 households, by which time the district had been separated from the county in the establishment of Bajestan County. The rural district was transferred to the new Central District. The 2016 census measured the population of the village as 80 people in 28 households.
