= Nuq =

NUQ or Nuq (Persian: نوق) may refer to:

- Nuq, Bajestan, Razavi Khorasan Province, Iran, a village
- Nuq, Roshtkhar, Razavi Khorasan Province, a village
- Nuq District, Kerman Province, Iran
- IATA airport code for Moffett Federal Airfield, California

== See also ==
- Nuuk, the capital of Greenland
- Nuk (disambiguation)
- Nuck (disambiguation)
- Nuc (disambiguation)
