= Zeynabad, Razavi Khorasan =

Village in Razavi Khorasan province, Iran

Zeynabad Persian: زين اباد
- Village
- Location within Iran
- Coordinates: 34°22′51″N 58°13′32″E
- Country: Iran
- Province: Razavi Khorasan
- County: Bajestan
- District: Central
- Rural District: Jazin

Population (2016)
  - Total: 828
- Time zone: UTC+3:30 (IRST)

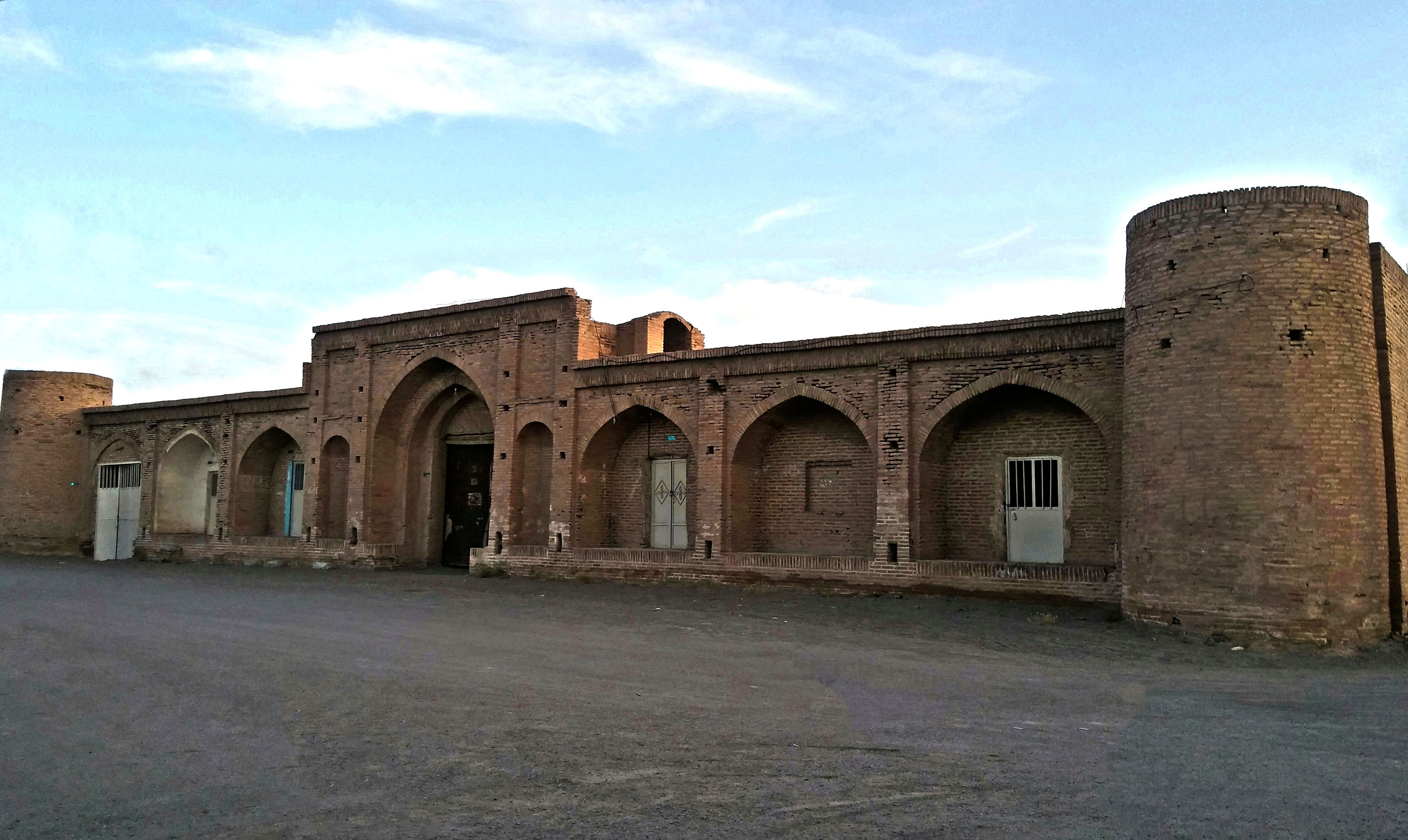

Zeynabad (Persian: زين اباد) (Note: Also romanized as Zainābād, Zeynābād, and Zīnābād) is a village in, and the capital of, Jazin Rural District in the Central District of Bajestan County, Razavi Khorasan province, Iran.

== Demographics ==
=== Population ===
At the time of the 2006 National Census, the village's population was 822 in 237 households, when it was in the former Bajestan District of Gonabad County. The following census in 2011 counted 902 people in 280 households, by which time the district had been separated from the county in the establishment of Bajestan County. The rural district was transferred to the new Central District. The 2016 census measured the population of the village as 828 people in 286 households.
