= Ab Barik-e Bala =

Village in Razavi Khorasan province, Iran

Ab Barik-e Bala Persian: اب باريك بالا
- Village
- Location within Iran
- Coordinates: 34°33′14″N 58°14′49″E
- Country: Iran
- Province: Razavi Khorasan
- County: Bajestan
- District: Central
- Rural District: Bajestan

Population (2016)
  - Total: Below reporting threshold
- Time zone: UTC+3:30 (IRST)

Ab Barik-e Bala (Persian: اب باريك بالا) (Note: Also romanized as Āb Bārīk-e Bālā; also known as Āb Bārīk) is a village in Bajestan Rural District of the Central District in Bajestan County, Razavi Khorasan province, Iran.

== Demographics ==
=== Population ===
At the time of the 2006 National Census, the village's population was 81 in 22 households, when it was in the former Bajestan District of Gonabad County. The following census in 2011 counted 26 people in eight households, by which time the district had been separated from the county in the establishment of Bajestan County, and the rural district was transferred to the new Central District. The 2016 census measured the population of the village as below the reporting threshold.
