= Darzab, Iran =

Village in Razavi Khorasan province, Iran

Darzab Persian: درزاب
- Village
- Location within Iran
- Coordinates: 34°26′05″N 58°10′00″E
- Country: Iran
- Province: Razavi Khorasan
- County: Bajestan
- District: Central
- Rural District: Bajestan

Population (2016)
  - Total: 264
- Time zone: UTC+3:30 (IRST)

Darzab (Persian: درزاب) (Note: Also romanized as Darz Āb and Darzāb) is a village in Bajestan Rural District of the Central District in Bajestan County, Razavi Khorasan province, Iran.

== Demographics ==
=== Population ===
At the time of the 2006 National Census, the village's population was 347 in 102 households, when it was in the former Bajestan District of Gonabad County. The following census in 2011 counted 343 people in 114 households, by which time the district had been separated from the county in the establishment of Bajestan County, and the rural district was transferred to the new Central District. The 2016 census measured the population of the village as 264 people in 96 households.

== Darzab Yellow Castle ==
Darzab Yellow Castle, dating back to the Safavid period, is located in the village of Darzab. The castle was registered as one of the national monuments of Iran on 1 December 2001, with the registration number 4578.
