= Zardak, Iran =

Zardak (Persian: زردك) may refer to:

- Zardak, Kohgiluyeh and Boyer-Ahmad
- Zardak, Kurdistan
- Zardak, Razavi Khorasan
