= Ru Sang =

Village in Razavi Khorasan province, Iran

Ru Sang Persian: روسنگ
- Village
- Location within Iran
- Coordinates: 34°25′27″N 58°11′01″E
- Country: Iran
- Province: Razavi Khorasan
- County: Bajestan
- District: Central
- Rural District: Jazin

Population (2016)
  - Total: Below reporting threshold
- Time zone: UTC+3:30 (IRST)

Ru Sang (Persian: روسنگ) (Note: Also romanized as Rū Sang; also known as Kalāteh-ye Rū Sang and Rui Sang) is a village in Jazin Rural District of the Central District in Bajestan County, Razavi Khorasan province, Iran.

== Demographics ==
=== Population ===
At the time of the 2006 National Census, the village's population was 15 in five households, when it was in the former Bajestan District of Gonabad County. The following census in 2011 counted 14 people in six households, by which time the district had been separated from the county in the establishment of Bajestan County. The rural district was transferred to the new Central District. The 2016 census measured the population of the village as below the reporting threshold.
