= Chah Chul =

Village in Razavi Khorasan province, Iran

Chah Chul Persian: چاه چول
- Village
- Country: Iran
- Province: Razavi Khorasan
- County: Bajestan
- District: Central
- Rural District: Bajestan

Population (2016)
  - Total: 0
- Time zone: UTC+3:30 (IRST)

Chah Chul (Persian: چاه چول) (Note: Also romanized as Chāh Chūl) is a village in Bajestan Rural District of the Central District in Bajestan County, Razavi Khorasan province, Iran.

== Demographics ==
=== Population ===
At the time of the 2006 National Census, the village's population was 42 in 14 households, when it was in the former Bajestan District of Gonabad County. The village did not appear in the following census of 2011, by which time the district had been separated from the county in the establishment of Bajestan County, and the rural district was transferred to the new Central District. The 2016 census measured the population of the village as zero.
