= Ezzat-e Pain =

Village in Razavi Khorasan province, Iran

Ezzat-e Pain Persian: عزتپايين
- Village
- Location within Iran
- Coordinates: 34°19′12″N 58°08′26″E
- Country: Iran
- Province: Razavi Khorasan
- County: Bajestan
- District: Central
- Rural District: Jazin

Population (2016)
  - Total: 0
- Time zone: UTC+3:30 (IRST)

Ezzat-e Pain (Persian: عزت پايين) (Note: Also romanized as ‘Ezzat-e Pā’īn; also known as Kalāteh-ye Cheshmeh Kabūd) is a village in Jazin Rural District of the Central District in Bajestan County, Razavi Khorasan province, Iran.

== Demographics ==
=== Population ===
At the time of the 2006 National Census, the village's population was 23 in 11 households, when it was in the former Bajestan District of Gonabad County. The following census in 2011 counted 33 people in 12 households, by which time the district had been separated from the county in the establishment of Bajestan County. The rural district was transferred to the new Central District. The 2016 census measured the population of the village as zero.
