= Kalateh-ye Moghri =

Village in Razavi Khorasan province, Iran

Kalateh-ye Moghri Persian: كلاته مغري
- Village
- Location within Iran
- Coordinates: 34°27′53″N 58°08′36″E
- Country: Iran
- Province: Razavi Khorasan
- County: Bajestan
- District: Central
- Rural District: Bajestan

Population (2016)
  - Total: Below reporting threshold
- Time zone: UTC+3:30 (IRST)

Kalateh-ye Moghri (Persian: كلاته مغري) (Note: Also romanized as Kalāteh-ye Moghrī; also known as Kalāteh-ye Mo‘ezzī and Kalāteh-ye Moqrī) is a village in Bajestan Rural District of the Central District in Bajestan County, Razavi Khorasan province, Iran.

== Demographics ==
=== Population ===
At the time of the 2006 National Census, the village's population was 70 in 14 households, when it was in the former Bajestan District of Gonabad County. The following censuses in 2011 and 2016 counted a population below the reporting threshold, by which time the district had been separated from the county in the establishment of Bajestan County, and the rural district was transferred to the new Central District.
