= Jazin =

Jazin or Jezin (Persian: جزين) may refer to:

- Jazin, Fars
- Jazin, Kerman
- Jezin, Mazandaran
- Jazin, Razavi Khorasan
- Jazin Rural District, in Razavi Khorasan Provinc
- Jazin 8520
