= Nian, Razavi Khorasan =

Village in Razavi Khorasan province, Iran

Nian Persian: نيان
- Village
- Location within Iran
- Coordinates: 34°25′25″N 57°58′01″E
- Country: Iran
- Province: Razavi Khorasan
- County: Bajestan
- District: Central
- Rural District: Bajestan

Population (2016)
  - Total: 173
- Time zone: UTC+3:30 (IRST)

Nian (Persian: نيان) (Note: Also romanized as Neyān, Nīān, and Nīyān) is a village in Bajestan Rural District of the Central District in Bajestan County, Razavi Khorasan province, Iran.

== Demographics ==
=== Population ===
At the time of the 2006 National Census, the village's population was 279 in 66 households, when it was in the former Bajestan District of Gonabad County. The following census in 2011 counted 226 people in 68 households, by which time the district had been separated from the county in the establishment of Bajestan County, and the rural district was transferred to the new Central District. The 2016 census measured the population of the village as 173 people in 54 households.
