= Hoseynabad, Bajestan =

Village in Razavi Khorasan province, Iran

Hoseynabad Persian: حسين آباد
- Village
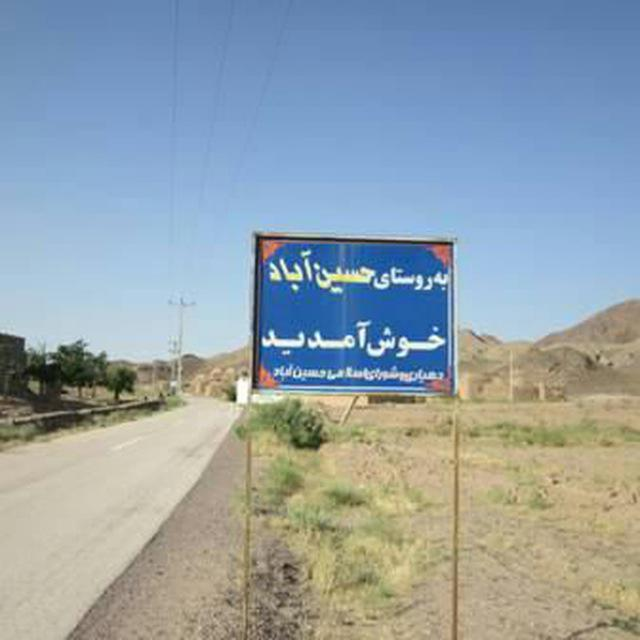
- Entrance to the village of Hoseynabad

- Location within Iran
- Coordinates: 34°28′13″N 58°19′56″E
- Country: Iran
- Province: Razavi Khorasan
- County: Bajestan
- District: Central
- Rural District: Bajestan

Population (2016)
  - Total: 42
- Time zone: UTC+3:30 (IRST)

Hoseynabad (Persian: حسين آباد) (Note: Also romanized as Ḩoseynābād) is a village in Bajestan Rural District of the Central District in Bajestan County, Razavi Khorasan province, Iran.

== Demographics ==
=== Population ===
At the time of the 2006 National Census, the village's population was 48 in 21 households, when it was in the former Bajestan District of Gonabad County. The following census in 2011 counted 31 people in 13 households, by which time the district had been separated from the county in the establishment of Bajestan County, and the rural district was transferred to the new Central District. The 2016 census measured the population of the village as 42 people in 21 households.
