= Motrabad =

Village in Razavi Khorasan province, Iran

Motrabad Persian: مطراباد
- Village
- Location within Iran
- Coordinates: 34°29′45″N 57°59′42″E
- Country: Iran
- Province: Razavi Khorasan
- County: Bajestan
- District: Central
- Rural District: Bajestan

Population (2016)
  - Total: 137
- Time zone: UTC+3:30 (IRST)

Motrabad (Persian: مطراباد) (Note: Also romanized as Moţrābād) is a village in Bajestan Rural District of the Central District in Bajestan County, Razavi Khorasan province, Iran.

== Demographics ==
=== Population ===
At the time of the 2006 National Census, the village's population was 154 in 45 households, when it was in the former Bajestan District of Gonabad County. The following census in 2011 counted 160 people in 53 households, by which time the district had been separated from the county in the establishment of Bajestan County, and the rural district was transferred to the new Central District. The 2016 census measured the population of the village as 137 people in 50 households.
