= Abu ol Khazen =

Village in Razavi Khorasan province, Iran

Abu ol Khazen Persian: ابوالخازن
- Village
- Location within Iran
- Coordinates: 34°20′31″N 57°55′11″E
- Country: Iran
- Province: Razavi Khorasan
- County: Bajestan
- District: Central
- Rural District: Jazin

Population (2016)
  - Total: 258
- Time zone: UTC+3:30 (IRST)

Abu ol Khazen (Persian: ابوالخازن) (Note: Also romanized as Abū Al Khāzen and Abū ol Khāzen; also known as Abolkhāzen, Shaikh Abul Khāzen, and Sheykh Abū ol Khāzen) is a village in Jazin Rural District of the Central District in Bajestan County, Razavi Khorasan province, Iran.

== Demographics ==
=== Population ===
At the time of the 2006 National Census, the village's population was 227 in 59 households, when it was in the former Bajestan District of Gonabad County. The following census in 2011 counted 256 people in 72 households, by which time the district had been separated from the county in the establishment of Bajestan County. The rural district was transferred to the new Central District. The 2016 census measured the population of the village as 258 people in 71 households.
