= Kalateh-ye Susnari-ye Bala =

Village in Razavi Khorasan province, Iran

Kalateh-ye Susnari-ye Bala Persian: كلاته سوسناري بالا
- Village
- Location within Iran
- Country: Iran
- Province: Razavi Khorasan
- County: Bajestan
- District: Central
- Rural District: Bajestan

Population (2016)
  - Total: 0
- Time zone: UTC+3:30 (IRST)

Kalateh-ye Susnari-ye Bala (Persian: كلاته سوسناري بالا) (Note: Also romanized as Kalāteh-ye Sūsnārī-ye Bālā; also known as Sūsnārī-ye Bālā) is a village in Bajestan Rural District of the Central District in Bajestan County, Razavi Khorasan province, Iran.

== Demographics ==
=== Population ===
At the time of the 2006 National Census, the village's population was 24 in eight households, when it was in the former Bajestan District of Gonabad County. The following census in 2011 counted a population below the reporting threshold, by which time the district had been separated from the county in the establishment of Bajestan County, and the rural district was transferred to the new Central District. The 2016 census measured the population of the village as zero.
