= Biku =

Biku may refer to:

- Biku, Bajestan, a village in Jazin Rural District, in the Central District of Bajestan County, Razavi Khorasan Province, Iran
- Biku, Fars, village in Jereh Rural District, Jereh and Baladeh District, Kazerun County, Fars Province, Iran
- Biku, village comes under orro panchayat in the Nardiganj block of the Nawada district in the state of Bihar, India
