= Sardeh =

Sardeh or Sar Deh (Persian: سرده) may refer to:

- Sardeh, Gilan
- Sar Deh, Razavi Khorasan
- Sardeh, Razavi Khorasan
- Sardeh, Sistan and Baluchestan
