= Marandiz, Bajestan =

Village in Razavi Khorasan province, Iran

Marandiz Persian: مارانديز
- Village
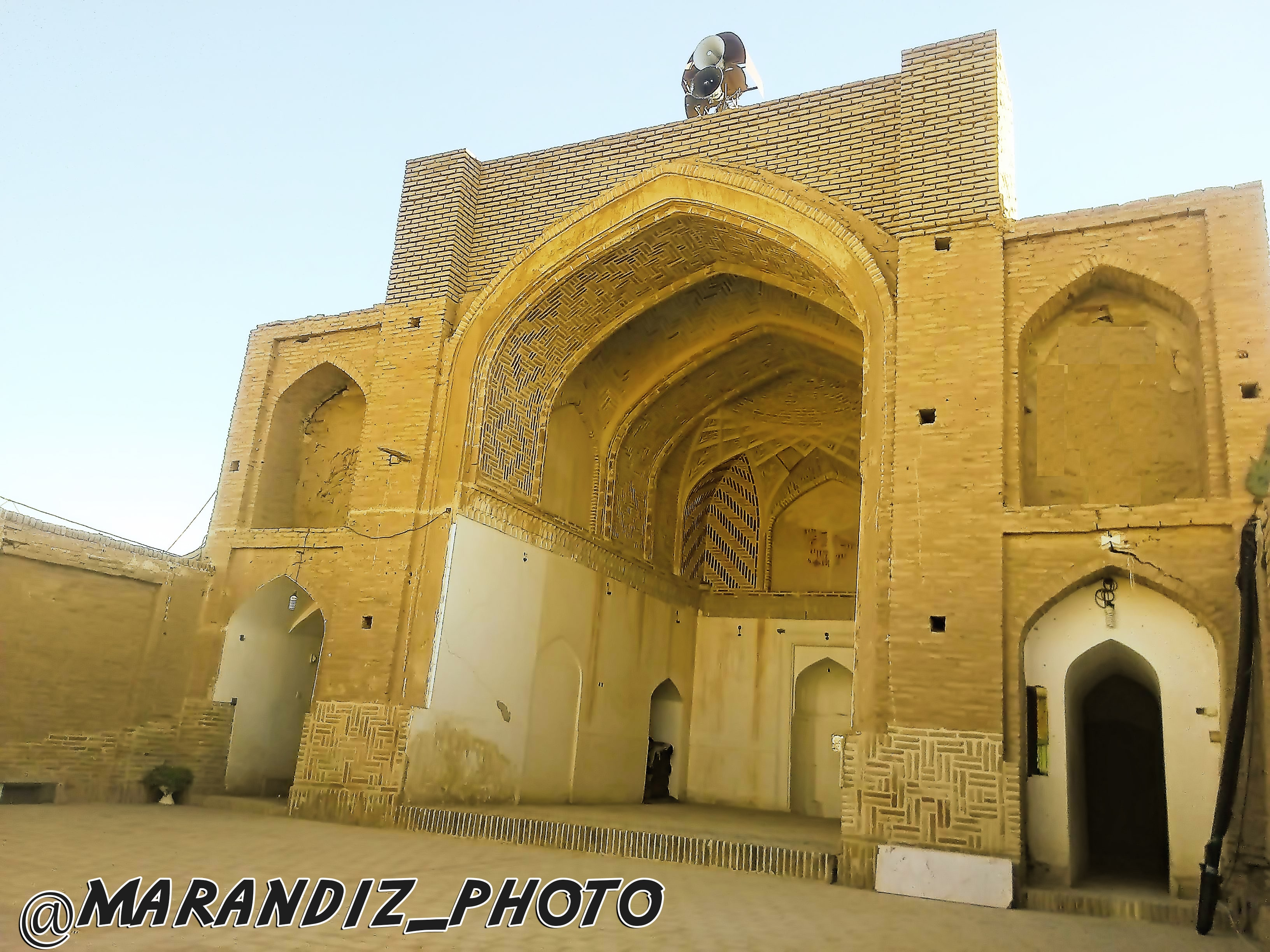
- Grand Mosque in the village of Marandiz

- Location within Iran
- Coordinates: 34°47′14″N 58°21′08″E
- Country: Iran
- Province: Razavi Khorasan
- County: Bajestan
- District: Yunesi
- Rural District: Yunesi

Population (2016)
  - Total: 2,902
- Time zone: UTC+3:30 (IRST)

Marandiz (Persian: مارانديز) (Note: Also romanized as Mārāndīz; also known as Marandez and Mīrāndīz) is a village in Yunesi Rural District of Yunesi District in Bajestan County, Razavi Khorasan province, Iran.

== Demographics ==
=== Population ===
At the time of the 2006 National Census, the village's population was 2,668 in 678 households, when it was in the former Bajestan District of Gonabad County. The following census in 2011 counted 2,819 people in 795 households, by which time the district had been separated from the county in the establishment of Bajestan County. The rural district was transferred to the new Yunesi District. The 2016 census measured the population of the village as 2,902 people in 872 households, the most populous in its rural district.
