= Jazin, Razavi Khorasan =

Village in Razavi Khorasan province, Iran

Jazin Persian: جزين
- Village
- Location within Iran
- Coordinates: 34°19′56″N 58°03′45″E
- Country: Iran
- Province: Razavi Khorasan
- County: Bajestan
- District: Central
- Rural District: Jazin

Population (2016)
  - Total: 2,068
- Time zone: UTC+3:30 (IRST)

Jazin (Persian: جزين) (Note: Also romanized as Jazīn; also known as Gazi) is a village in Jazin Rural District of the Central District in Bajestan County, Razavi Khorasan province, Iran.

== Demographics ==
=== Population ===
At the time of the 2006 National Census, the village's population was 2,033 in 562 households, when it was in the former Bajestan District of Gonabad County. The following census in 2011 counted 2,495 people in 747 households, by which time the district had been separated from the county in the establishment of Bajestan County. The rural district was transferred to the new Central District. The 2016 census measured the population of the village as 2,068 people in 650 households, the most populous in its rural district.
