= Ahang, Iran =

Village in Razavi Khorasan province, Iran

Ahang Persian: اهنگ
- Village
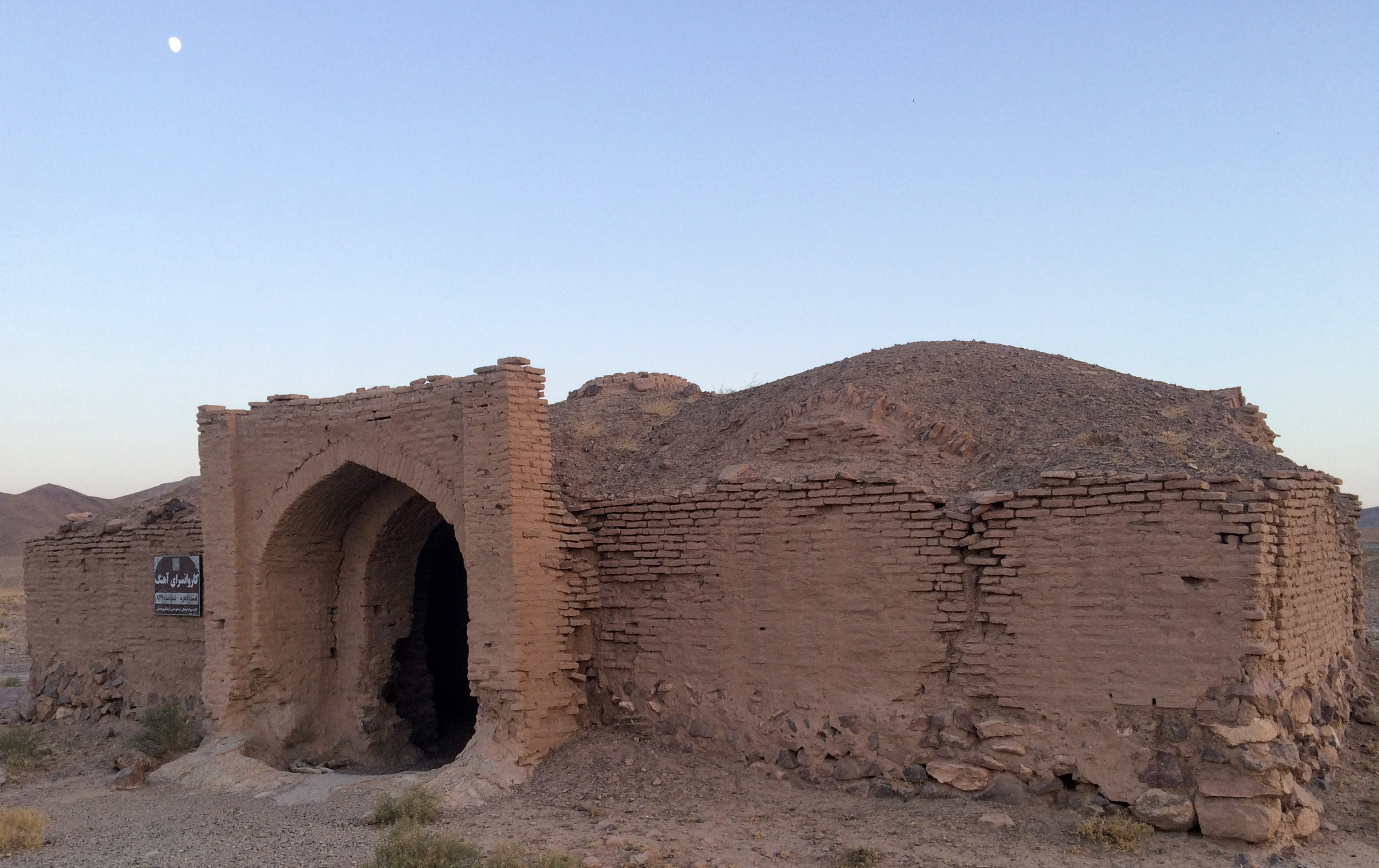
- The village of Ahang

- Location within Iran
- Coordinates: 34°20′17″N 58°15′47″E
- Country: Iran
- Province: Razavi Khorasan
- County: Bajestan
- District: Central
- Rural District: Jazin

Population (2016)
  - Total: 160
- Time zone: UTC+3:30 (IRST)

Ahang (Persian: اهنگ) (Note: Also romanized as Āhang; also known as Ohak) is a village in Jazin Rural District of the Central District in Bajestan County, Razavi Khorasan province, Iran.

== Demographics ==
=== Population ===
At the time of the 2006 National Census, the village's population was 427 in 141 households, when it was in the former Bajestan District of Gonabad County. The following census in 2011 counted 418 people in 144 households, by which time the district had been separated from the county in the establishment of Bajestan County. The rural district was transferred to the new Central District. The 2016 census measured the population of the village as 425 people in 152 households.
