= Jameh Mosque of Marandiz =

Mosque in Marandiz, Razavi Khorasan, Iran

Jāmeh Mosque of Marandiz
- مسجد جامع مرندیز
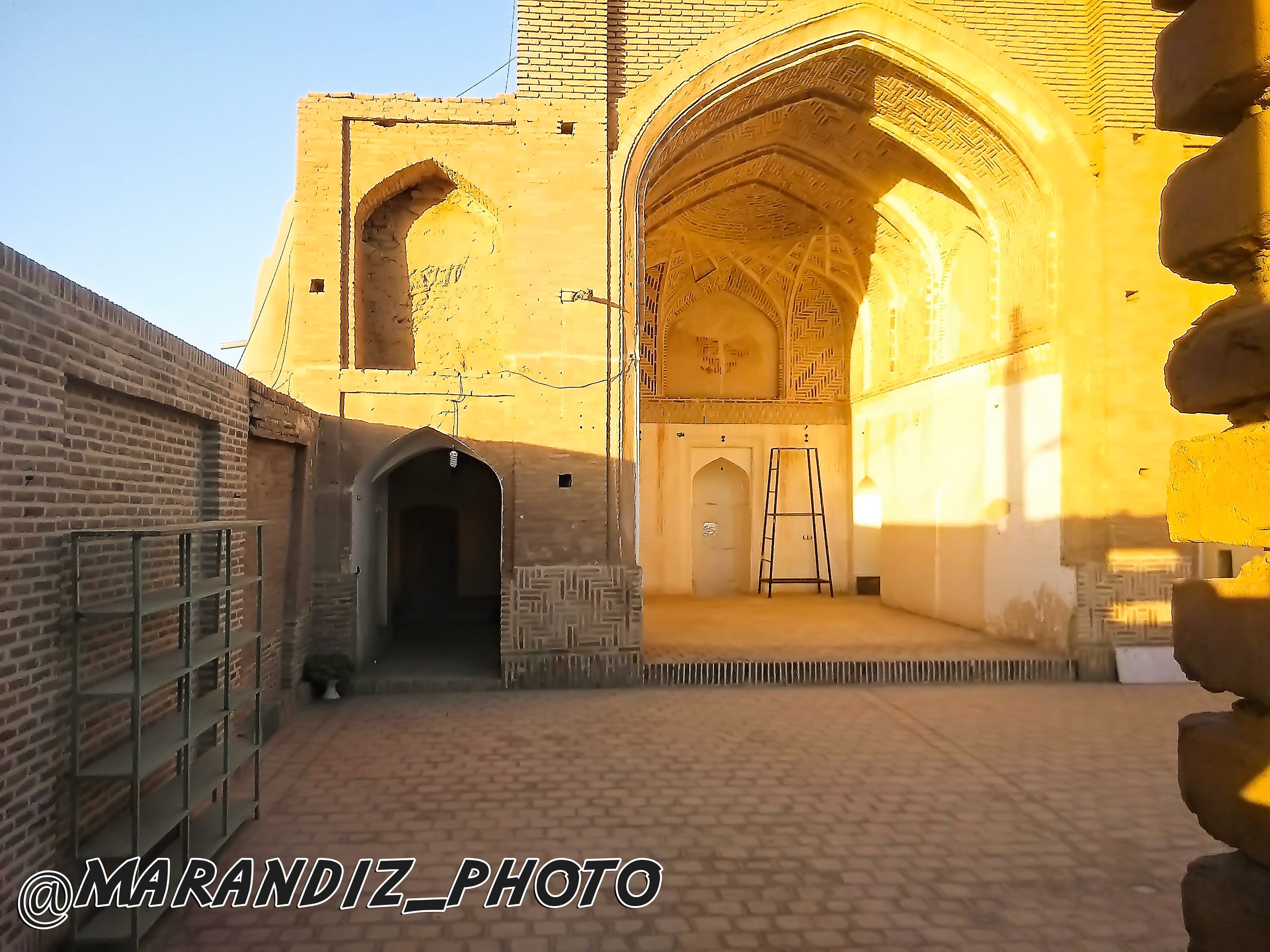
- The mosque in 2016

- Location of the mosque in Iran

Religion
- Affiliation: Shia Islam
- Ecclesiastical or organizational status: Friday mosque
- Status: Active

Location
- Location: Marandiz, Bajestan County, Razavi Khorasan Province
- Country: Iran
- Interactive map of Jāmeh Mosque of Marandiz
- Coordinates: 34°47′22″N 58°21′11″E

Architecture
- Type: Mosque architecture
- Style: Ilkhanid

Specifications
- Interior area: 600 m^{2} (6,500 sq ft)
- Dome: One (maybe more)
- Materials: Bricks; plaster; tiles

Iran National Heritage List
- Official name: Jāmeh Mosque of Marandiz
- Type: Built
- Designated: 7 August 2004
- Reference no.: 11056
- Conservation organization: Cultural Heritage, Handicrafts and Tourism Organization of Iran

The Jāmeh Mosque of Marandiz (Persian: مسجد جامع مرندیز; Arabic: جامع مرنديز) is a Shi'ite Friday mosque (jāmeh) located in Marandiz, in the county of Bajestan, in the province of Razavi Khorasan, Iran.

Completed during the Ilkhanate era, the mosque was added to the Iran National Heritage List on 7 August 2004, administered by the Cultural Heritage, Handicrafts and Tourism Organization of Iran.

== See also ==
- Shia Islam in Iran
- List of mosques in Iran
