= Sar Daq Rural District =

Rural district in Razavi Khorasan province, Iran

Sar Daq Rural District Persian: دهستان سردق
- Rural District
- Location within Iran
- Coordinates: 34°47′N 58°02′E
- Country: Iran
- Province: Razavi Khorasan
- County: Bajestan
- District: Yunesi
- Established: 2007
- Capital: Sar Daq

Population (2016)
  - Total: 4,979
- Time zone: UTC+3:30 (IRST)

Sar Daq Rural District (Persian: دهستان سردق) is in Yunesi District of Bajestan County, Razavi Khorasan province, Iran. Its capital is the village of Sar Daq.

== History ==
In 2007, Bajestan District was separated from Gonabad County in the establishment of Bajestan County, and Sar Daq Rural District was created in the new Yunesi District.

== Demographics ==
=== Population ===
At the time of the 2011 National Census, the rural district's population was 3,959 inhabitants in 1,080 households. The 2016 census measured the population of the rural district as 4,979 in 1,560 households. The most populous of its 52 villages was Fakhrabad, with 2,764 people.

=== Other villages in the rural district ===
- Ebrahimabad
- Kureh Ajar-e Azargun
- Mansuri
