= Nuq, Bajestan =

Village in Razavi Khorasan province, Iran

Nuq Persian: نوق
- Village
- Location within Iran
- Coordinates: 34°17′33″N 58°09′30″E
- Country: Iran
- Province: Razavi Khorasan
- County: Bajestan
- District: Central
- Rural District: Jazin

Population (2016)
  - Total: 772
- Time zone: UTC+3:30 (IRST)

Nuq (Persian: نوق) (Note: Also romanized as Nūq; also known as Deh-e Nūq, Nūgh, and Nūk) is a village in Jazin Rural District of the Central District in Bajestan County, Razavi Khorasan province, Iran.

== Demographics ==
=== Population ===
At the time of the 2006 National Census, the village's population was 828 in 237 households, when it was in the former Bajestan District of Gonabad County. The following census in 2011 counted 895 people in 271 households, by which time the district had been separated from the county in the establishment of Bajestan County. The rural district was transferred to the new Central District. The 2016 census measured the population of the village as 772 people in 243 households.
