= Bigu =

Bigu may refer to:

- Bigu (grain avoidance)
- Bigu Rural Municipality, Nepal
- Bigu, Iran
