= Ahang =

Ahang (Persian: آهَنگ) may refer to:

- Ahang Expressway, near Tehran, Iran
- Ahang, Iran, a village near Tehran, Iran
- Johannis "Ahang" Winar, Indonesian basketball coach and former player
