= Nuck =

Nuck may refer to:

== People ==
- Anton Nuck (1650–1692), Dutch physician
- Robert Nuck (born 1983), German sprint canoeist
- nickname of Enoch Brown (American football) (1892–1962), American college football player and Rhodes Scholar
- nickname of Enoch L. Johnson (1883–1968), American politician and racketeer during Prohibition
- nickname of Chris Nilan (born 1958), American former National Hockey League player and former radio host

== Fictional characters ==
- Nucky Thompson, also nicknamed Nuck, in the television series Boardwalk Empire

== See also ==
- Nucks, a nickname of the Vancouver Canucks National Hockey League team
- Nuuk, the capital of Greenland
- Nuk (disambiguation)
- Nuq (disambiguation)
- Nuc (disambiguation)
