= Newk =

Newk is the nickname of:

- Don Newcombe (1926–2019), American baseball player
- Sonny Rollins (1930–2026), American jazz saxophonist

== See also ==
- Newk's Eatery, American cafe chain
- Newark Newks, former baseball team
- Nuke (disambiguation)
