= Bajestan Rural District =

Rural district in Razavi Khorasan province, Iran

Bajestan Rural District Persian: دهستان بجستان
- Rural District
- Location within Iran
- Coordinates: 34°32′N 58°09′E
- Country: Iran
- Province: Razavi Khorasan
- County: Bajestan
- District: Central
- Established: 1987

Population (2016)
  - Total: 2,867
- Time zone: UTC+3:30 (IRST)

Bajestan Rural District (Persian: دهستان بجستان) is in the Central District of Bajestan County, Razavi Khorasan province, Iran.

== Demographics ==
=== Population ===
At the time of the 2006 National Census, the rural district's population (as a part of the former Bajestan District in Gonabad County) was 3,382 in 943 households. There were 3,162 inhabitants in 996 households at the following census of 2011, by which time the district had been separated from the county in the establishment of Bajestan County, and the rural district was transferred to the new Central District. The 2016 census measured the population of the rural district as 2,867 in 963 households. The most populous of its 210 villages was Mazar, with 934 people.

=== Other villages in the rural district ===
- Ab Barik-e Bala
- Ahmadabad
- Chah Chul
- Chekkeh Ab
- Darchaq
- Darzab
- Hoseynabad
- Kalateh-ye Moghri
- Kalateh-ye Susnari-ye Bala
- Kameh
- Khar Firuzi
- Motrabad
- Nian
- Now Bahar
- Qasemabad
- Senjetak
- Solhabad
