= Nukem =

Nukem may refer to:

- Duke Nukem, character in Captain Planet and the Planeteers
- Duke Nukem (character), fictional character and protagonist of the Duke Nukem series
- Nukem Energy, German nuclear fuel company
- Nukem Technologies, German nuclear waste company
- Teddy Joseph Von Nukem (1987–2023), American white nationalist and far-right extremist

== See also ==
- Duke Nukem, American video game series
- Newcomb ball, game also called "nuke 'em"
- Nuke (disambiguation)
