= Yunesi =

City in Razavi Khorasan province, Iran

Yunesi Persian: يونسي
- City
- Location within Iran
- Coordinates: 34°48′20″N 58°26′14″E
- Country: Iran
- Province: Razavi Khorasan
- County: Bajestan
- District: Yunesi
- Established as a city: 1999

Population (2016)
  - Total: 3,426
- Time zone: UTC+3:30 (IRST)
- Climate: BWh

Yunesi (Persian: يونسي) (Note: Also romanized as Yūnosī and Yūnsi) is a city in, and the capital of, Yunesi District in Bajestan County, Razavi Khorasan province, Iran. It also serves as the administrative center for Yunesi Rural District. The village of Yunesi was converted to a city in 1999.

== Demographics ==
=== Population ===
At the time of the 2006 National Census, the city's population was 3,349 in 947 households, when it was in the former Bajestan District of Gonabad County. The following census in 2011 counted 3,504 people in 1,108 households, by which time the district had been separated from the county in the establishment of Bajestan County. Yunesi was transferred to the new Yunesi District. The 2016 census measured the population of the city as 3,426 people in 1,113 households.
