= Zardak, Kurdistan =

Zardak زردك
- Village
- Location within Iran
- Coordinates: 35°42′18″N 46°54′02″E
- Country: Iran
- Province: Kurdistan
- County: Divandarreh
- Bakhsh: Saral
- Rural District: Saral

Population (2006)
  - Total: 55
- Time zone: UTC+3:30 (IRST)
  - Summer (DST): UTC+4:30 (IRDT)

Zardak (Persian: زردك; also known as Zartak) is a village in Saral Rural District, Saral District, Divandarreh County, Kurdistan Province, Iran. At the 2006 census, its population was 55, in 9 families. The village is populated by Kurds.
