= Nuk, Sarbisheh =

Nuk نوك
- Village
- Location within Iran
- Coordinates: 32°40′37″N 59°28′29″E
- Country: Iran
- Province: South Khorasan
- County: Sarbisheh
- Bakhsh: Mud
- Rural District: Mud

Population (2006)
  - Total: 59
- Time zone: UTC+3:30 (IRST)
  - Summer (DST): UTC+4:30 (IRDT)

Nuk (Persian: نوك, also Romanized as Nūk and Nook) is a village in Mud Rural District, Mud District, Sarbisheh County, South Khorasan Province, Iran. At the 2006 census, its population was 59, in 22 families.
