= Nuke (disambiguation) =

A nuke is a nuclear weapon, a powerful bomb.

Nuke may also refer to:

== Computing ==
- Nuke (computer), a denial-of-service attack
- Nuke (software), a visual effects application
- Nuke (video games), a spell or skill that can deal great damage
- Nuke (warez), flagging problems with pirated software
- Total data loss

== Fictional uses ==
- Nuke (Counter-Strike), a 1999 multiplayer map
- Nuke (Marvel Comics), a 1986 supervillain
- Nuke (Squadron Supreme), a 1970s Marvel superhero
- "Nuke" LaLoosh, in the 1988 film Bull Durham
- Nuke, a narcotic in the 1990 film RoboCop 2
- Luke Snyder and Noah Mayer, a 2007 supercouple in television series As the World Turns

== See also ==
- Luke Littler, English darts player (nickname: The Nuke)
- Newk, a nickname
- Nuc, a small honeybee colony
- Nuuk, Greenland
- Nukem (disambiguation)
- Microwave oven, or cooking therein
- A US Navy sailor operating nuclear power plants; see Nuclear Power School
