= Bajestan =

City in Razavi Khorasan province, Iran

Bajestan Persian: بجستان
- City
- Location within Iran
- Coordinates: 34°31′04″N 58°11′04″E
- Country: Iran
- Province: Razavi Khorasan
- County: Bajestan
- District: Central

Population (2016)
  - Total: 11,741
- Time zone: UTC+3:30 (IRST)
- Climate: BWk

Public gathering in Bajestan, Iran, in 2012.

Bajestan (Persian: بجستان) (Note: Also romanized as Bajestān and Bejestān; also known as Bījestān and Bījistān) is a city in the Central District of Bajestan County, Razavi Khorasan province, Iran, serving as capital of both the county and the district.

== Demographics ==
=== Population ===
At the time of the 2006 National Census, the city's population was 11,136 in 3,090 households, when it was capital of the former Bajestan District in Gonabad County. The following census in 2011 counted 11,133 people in 3,394 households, by which time the district had been separated from the county in the establishment of Bajestan County. Bajestan was transferred to the new Central District as the county's capital. The 2016 census measured the population of the city as 11,741 people in 3,768 households.

== Overview ==
The most important products of Bajestan are saffron and pomegranate.

The city has a dry climate with significant difference between day and night temperatures. It is a fast-growing city, thus becoming one of the major centres in the south of Razavi Khorasan.

There are some historical places in Bajestan such as fakhrabad caravanserai ، ghasem abad caravanserai، zeinabad caravanserai، bajestan grand mosque ، yonsi Bridge ، marandiz mosque ، mazar mosque and castle and mazar monastery in various post Islamic era.

Bajestan salt desert is a natural scenery attracting tourism groups from adjacent cities ، but because this desert is a dried Salt Lake ، camping is not possible in winter and late autumn.

== Notable people ==
Iranian Cleric Mahmoud Madani Bajistani is from here.

== See also ==
- List of cities, towns and villages in Razavi Khorasan Province
