= Jazin Rural District =

Rural district in Razavi Khorasan province, Iran

Jazin Rural District Persian: دهستان جزين
- Rural District
- Location within Iran
- Coordinates: 34°21′N 58°03′E
- Country: Iran
- Province: Razavi Khorasan
- County: Bajestan
- District: Central
- Established: 1987
- Capital: Zeynabad

Population (2016)
  - Total: 5,225
- Time zone: UTC+3:30 (IRST)

Jazin Rural District (Persian: دهستان جزين) is in the Central District of Bajestan County, Razavi Khorasan province, Iran. Its capital is the village of Zeynabad.

== Demographics ==
=== Population ===
At the time of the 2006 National Census, the rural district's population (as a part of the former Bajestan District in Gonabad County) was 5,294 in 1,533 households. There were 6,031 inhabitants in 1,861 households at the following census of 2011, by which time the district had been separated from the county in the establishment of Bajestan County. The rural district was transferred to the new Central District. The 2016 census measured the population of the rural district as 5,225 in 1,711 households. The most populous of its 191 villages was Jazin, with 2,068 people.

=== Other villages in the rural district ===
- Abu ol Khazen
- Afkan
- Ahang
- Biku
- Boqchir
- Ezzat-e Pain
- Kasabad-e Pain
- Khush Manzal
- Nuq
- Rezaiyeh
- Ru Sang
- Sheshtuk
- Sarideh
