= Biku (Bihar) =

- Village
- Location in Bihar, India Biku (India)
- Coordinates: 24.9123236°N 85.4020957°E
- Country: India
- State: Bihar
- District: Nawada

Government
  - Type: Panchayati Raj (India)
  - Body: Gram panchayat

Languages
  - Official: Bihari
  - Other spoken: Hindi
- Time zone: UTC+5:30 (IST)
- ISO 3166 code: IN-BR

Biku is a village in Nardiganj Block in Nawada district in the state of Bihar, India. Its PIN code is 805109. The local language is Magahi. As of the 2011 census, the total population is 2825.

Well known place in this village are Thakur Aastha, Devi Asthan, Hanuman Than.

In Biku, two festival are broadly organized by villagers. Sarswati puja, Ganesh Puja. Sarswati Puja mainly organized by Oldest Organisation Sarswati Naty Kala Parishad, Biku.
