= Nuk, Birjand =

Nuk نوك
- Village
- Location within Iran
- Coordinates: 33°02′15″N 59°27′37″E
- Country: Iran
- Province: South Khorasan
- County: Birjand
- Bakhsh: Central
- Rural District: Kahshang

Population (2016)
  - Total: 49
- Time zone: UTC+3:30 (IRST)
  - Summer (DST): UTC+4:30 (IRDT)

Nuk (Persian: نوک, also Romanized as Nūk) is a village in Kahshang Rural District, in the Central District of Birjand County, South Khorasan Province, Iran. In the 2016 census, its population was 49, in 17 families.
