= NUC =

NUC or Nuc may refer to:

== People ==
- Tomáš Nuc (born 1989), Czech footballer

== Organizations ==
=== Education ===
- National Union Catalog, printed catalog of books catalogued by the Library of Congress and other American and Canadian libraries
- North University of China, in Taiyuan, Shanxi
- Newcastle University College, now part of the University of Newcastle (Australia)
- National University College, in Puerto Rico
- National Underclassmen Combine, an American football program
- National Universities Commission, in Nigeria

=== Other organizations ===
- National Union Committee, a political organization in Bahrain
- NATO–Ukraine Council, joint collaborative and advisory body

== Military ==
- Navy Unit Commendation, a U.S. award
- Naval Undersea Center, now Naval Information Warfare Center Pacific
- Naval Auxiliary Landing Field San Clemente Island, California, U.S., FAA code NUC

== Other uses ==
- Nuc, a small honey bee colony
- National Union Catalog, of the U.S. Library of Congress
- Neutral unit of construction, private currency used by the airline industry
- Next Unit of Computing, an Intel small PC
- Not Upwardly Compatible software
- Nukini language, ISO 639-3 code nuc

== See also ==
- Nuke (disambiguation)
