= Bikuh =

Bikuh بيكوه
- Village
- Location within Iran
- Coordinates: 29°16′52″N 51°54′54″E
- Country: Iran
- Province: Fars
- County: Kazerun
- Bakhsh: Jereh and Baladeh
- Rural District: Jereh

Population (2006)
  - Total: 534
- Time zone: UTC+3:30 (IRST)
  - Summer (DST): UTC+4:30 (IRDT)

Bikuh (Persian: بيكوه, also Romanized as Bīkūh; also known as Bīgū and Biku) is a village in Jereh Rural District, Jereh and Baladeh District, Kazerun County, Fars province, Iran. At the 2006 census, its population was 534, in 109 families.
