= Nuq, Roshtkhar =

Village in Razavi Khorasan province, Iran

Nuq Persian: نوق
- Village
- Location within Iran
- Coordinates: 35°04′58″N 59°36′04″E
- Country: Iran
- Province: Razavi Khorasan
- County: Roshtkhar
- District: Central
- Rural District: Roshtkhar

Population (2016)
  - Total: 1,758
- Time zone: UTC+3:30 (IRST)

Nuq (Persian: نوق) (Note: Also romanized as Nūq; also known as Nūgh, Nūk (نوک), and Nūk Neyz (نوك نيز)) is a village in Roshtkhar Rural District of the Central District in Roshtkhar County, Razavi Khorasan province, Iran.

== Demographics ==
=== Population ===
At the time of the 2006 National Census, the village's population was 1,737 in 376 households. The following census in 2011 counted 1,739 people in 457 households. The 2016 census measured the population of the village as 1,758 people in 477 households.
