= Yunesi District =

District in Razavi Khorasan province, Iran

Yunesi District Persian: بخش يونسي
- District
- Location within Iran
- Coordinates: 34°47′N 58°14′E
- Country: Iran
- Province: Razavi Khorasan
- County: Bajestan
- Established: 2007
- Capital: Yunesi

Population (2016)
  - Total: 11,374
- Time zone: UTC+3:30 (IRST)

Yunesi District (Persian: بخش يونسي) is in Bajestan County, Razavi Khorasan province, Iran. Its capital is the city of Yunesi.

== History ==
In 2007, Bajestan District was separated from Gonabad County in the establishment of Bajestan County, which was divided into two districts of two rural districts each, with the city of Bajestan as its capital.

== Demographics ==
=== Population ===
At the time of the 2011 National Census, the district's population was 10,338 people in 3,001 households. The 2016 census measured the population of the district as 11,374 inhabitants in 3,569 households.

=== Administrative divisions ===
Yunesi District Population
Administrative Divisions	2011	2016
Sar Daq RD	3,959	4,979
Yunesi RD	2,875	2,969
Yunesi (city)	3,504	3,426
Total	10,338	11,374
RD = Rural District
