= Yunesi Rural District =

Rural district in Razavi Khorasan province, Iran

Yunesi Rural District Persian: دهستان يونسي
- Rural District
- Location within Iran
- Coordinates: 34°46′N 58°24′E
- Country: Iran
- Province: Razavi Khorasan
- County: Bajestan
- District: Yunesi
- Established: 1987
- Capital: Yunesi

Population (2016)
  - Total: 2,969
- Time zone: UTC+3:30 (IRST)

Yunesi Rural District (Persian: دهستان يونسي) is in Yunesi District of Bajestan County, Razavi Khorasan province, Iran. It is administered from the city of Yunesi.

== Demographics ==
=== Population ===
At the time of the 2006 National Census, the rural district's population (as a part of the former Bajestan District in Gonabad County) was 6,334 in 1,584 households. There were 2,875 inhabitants in 813 households at the following census of 2011, by which time the district had been separated from the county in the establishment of Bajestan County. The rural district was transferred to the new Yunesi District. The 2016 census measured the population of the rural district as 2,969 in 896 households. The most populous of its 41 villages was Marandiz, with 2,902 people.
