= Central District (Bajestan County) =

District in Razavi Khorasan province, Iran

Central District (Bajestan County) Persian: بخش مرکزی شهرستان بجستان
- District
- Location within Iran
- Coordinates: 34°27′N 58°09′E
- Country: Iran
- Province: Razavi Khorasan
- County: Bajestan
- Established: 2007
- Capital: Bajestan

Population (2016)
  - Total: 19,833
- Time zone: UTC+3:30 (IRST)

The Central District of Bajestan County (Persian: بخش مرکزی شهرستان بجستان) is in Razavi Khorasan province, Iran. Its capital is the city of Bajestan.

== History ==
In 2007, Bajestan District was separated from Gonabad County in the establishment of Bajestan County, which was divided into two districts of two rural districts each, with the city of Bajestan as its capital.

== Demographics ==
=== Population ===
At the time of the 2011 census, the district's population was 20,326 people in 6,251 households. The 2016 census measured the population of the district as 19,833 inhabitants in 6,442 households.

=== Administrative divisions ===
Central District (Bajestan County) Population
Administrative Divisions	2011	2016
Bajestan RD	3,162	2,867
Jazin RD	6,031	5,225
Bajestan (city)	11,133	11,741
Total	20,326	19,833
RD = Rural District
