= Bajestan County =

County in Razavi Khorasan province, Iran

Bajestan County Persian: شهرستان بجستان
- County
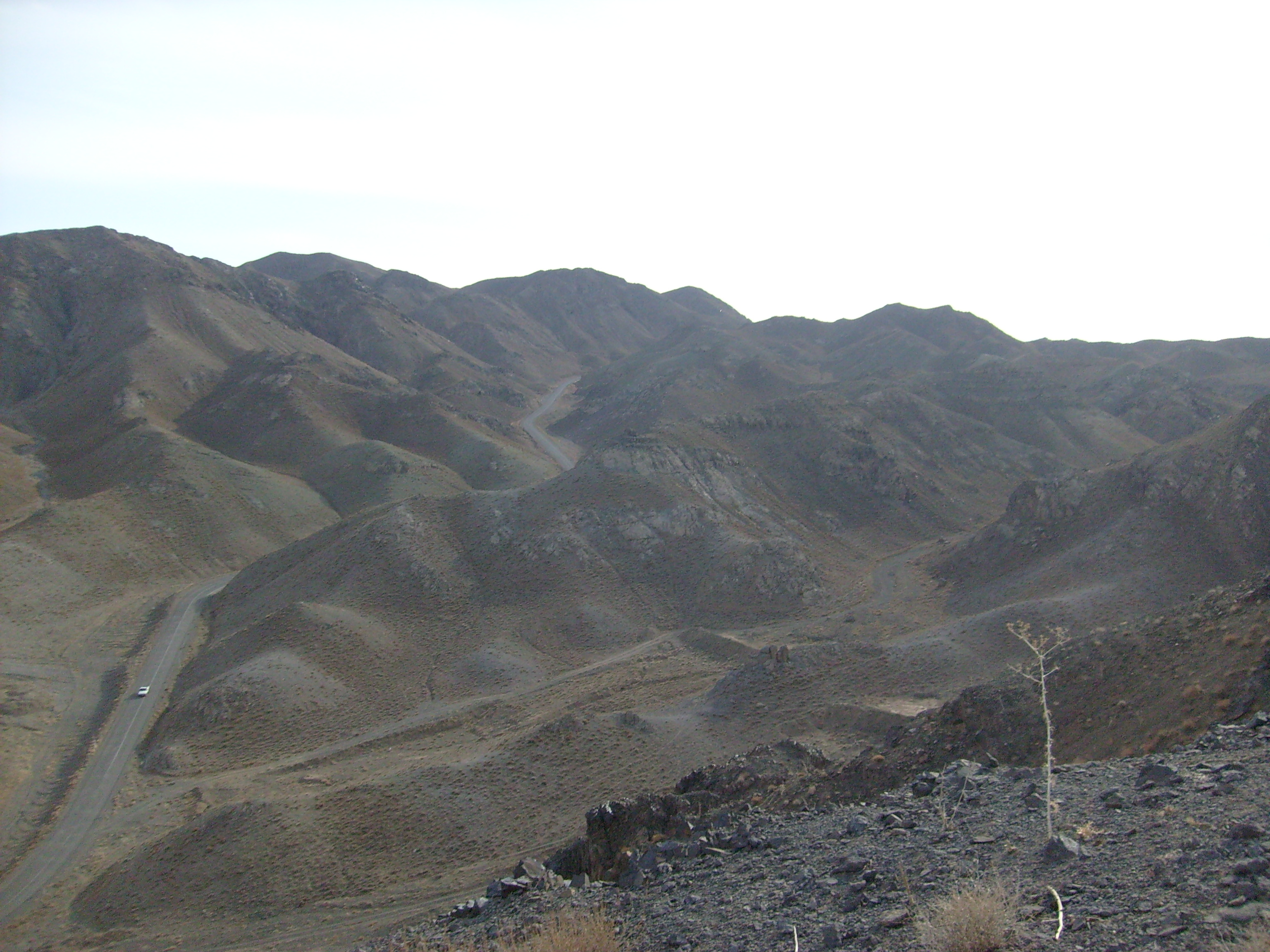
- Landscape near the village of Jazin

- Location of Bajestan County in Razavi Khorasan province (bottom left, yellow)

- Location of Razavi Khorasan province in Iran
- Coordinates: 34°35′N 58°12′E
- Country: Iran
- Province: Razavi Khorasan
- Established: 2007
- Capital: Bajestan
- Districts: Central, Yunesi

Area
  - Total: 3,792 km^{2} (1,464 sq mi)

Population (2016)
  - Total: 31,207
  - Density: 8.230/km^{2} (21.31/sq mi)
- Time zone: UTC+3:30 (IRST)

Bajestan County (Persian: شهرستان بجستان) is in Razavi Khorasan province, Iran. Its capital is the city of Bajestan.

== History ==
In 2007, Bajestan District was separated from Gonabad County in the establishment of Bajestan County, which was divided into two districts of two rural districts each, with the city of Bajestan as its capital.

== Demographics ==
=== Population ===
At the time of the 2011 National Census, the county's population was 30,664 people in 9,244 households. The 2016 census measured the population of the county as 31,207 in 10,011 households.

=== Administrative divisions ===
Bajestan County's population history and administrative structure over two consecutive censuses are shown in the following table.

Bajestan County Population
Administrative Divisions	2011	2016
Central District	20,326	19,833
Bajestan RD	3,162	2,867
Jazin RD	6,031	5,225
Bajestan (city)	11,133	11,741
Yunesi District	10,338	11,374
Sar Daq RD	3,959	4,979
Yunesi RD	2,875	2,969
Yunesi (city)	3,504	3,426
Total	30,664	31,207
RD = Rural District

== See also ==
Media related to Bajestan County at Wikimedia Commons
