= Bajestan District =

Former district in Razavi Khorasan province, Iran

Bajestan District Persian: بخش بجستان
- Former District
- Location within Iran
- Coordinates: 34°35′N 58°12′E
- Country: Iran
- Province: Razavi Khorasan
- County: Gonabad
- Capital: Bajestan

Population (2006)
  - Total: 29,495
- Time zone: UTC+3:30 (IRST)

Bajestan District (Persian: بخش بجستان) is a former administrative division of Gonabad County, Razavi Khorasan province, Iran. Its capital was the city of Bajestan.

== History ==
In 2007, the district was separated from the county in the establishment of Bajestan County.

== Demographics ==
=== Population ===
At the time of the 2006 National Census, the district's population was 29,495 in 8,097 households.

=== Administrative divisions ===
Bajestan District Population
| Administrative Divisions | 2006 |
|---|---|
| Bajestan RD | 3,382 |
| Jazin RD | 5,294 |
| Yunesi RD | 6,334 |
| Bajestan (city) | 11,136 |
| Yunesi (city) | 3,349 |
| Total | 29,495 |
RD = Rural District
