= Dehgah =

Dehgah or Deh Gah or Deh-e Gah (Persian: دهگاه), also rendered as Dehga, may refer to:

- Deh Gah, Chaharmahal and Bakhtiari
- Deh Gah, Farashband, Fars Province
- Dehgah, Firuzabad, Fars Province
- Dehgah, Kazerun, Fars Province
- Deh Gah, Rostam, Fars Province
- Dehgah, Sepidan, Fars Province
- Dehgah, Astaneh-ye Ashrafiyeh, Gilan Province
- Dehgah, Dehshal, Astaneh-ye Ashrafiyeh County, Gilan Province
- Dehgah, Siahkal, Gilan Province
- Deh Gah, Andika, Khuzestan Province
- Dehgah, Dezful, Khuzestan Province
- Deh Gah, Masjed Soleyman, Khuzestan Province
- Dehgah-e Gaheshlun, Dezful County, Khuzestan Province
- Dehgah-e Tapi, Dezful County, Khuzestan Province
- Dehgah 2, Izeh County, Khuzestan Province
- Dehgah-e Lalmir, Izeh County, Khuzestan Province
- Deh Gah, Kohgiluyeh and Boyer-Ahmad
- Dehgah, Aligudarz, Lorestan Province
- Dehgah, Borujerd, Lorestan Province
- Dehgah, Khorramabad, Lorestan Province
- Dehgah, North Khorasan
- Dehgah Rural District, in Gilan Province
