= Janiabad =

Janiabad (Persian: جاني اباد) may refer to:

- Janiabad, Farashband, Fars Province
- Janiabad, Firuzabad, Fars Province
- Janiabad, Rostam, Fars Province
- Janiabad, Kerman
