= Khur Ab =

Khur Ab خوراب
- Village
- Location within Iran
- Coordinates: 28°35′44″N 52°18′58″E
- Country: Iran
- Province: Fars
- County: Farashband
- Bakhsh: Dehram
- Rural District: Dehram

Population (2006)
  - Total: 116
- Time zone: UTC+3:30 (IRST)
  - Summer (DST): UTC+4:30 (IRDT)

Khur Ab (Persian: خوراب, also Romanized as Khūr Āb; also known as Ḩūrāb, Kaura, Khorab, Khūro, Khūrrāb, and Khūru) is a village in Dehram Rural District, Dehram District, Farashband County, Fars province, Iran. At the 2006 census, its population was 116, in 26 families.
