= Qanat Bagh, Fars =

Qanat Bagh قناتباغ
- Village
- Location within Iran
- Coordinates: 29°04′03″N 51°52′37″E
- Country: Iran
- Province: Fars
- County: Farashband
- Bakhsh: Central
- Rural District: Aviz

Population (2006)
  - Total: 303
- Time zone: UTC+3:30 (IRST)
  - Summer (DST): UTC+4:30 (IRDT)

Qanat Bagh (Persian: قناتباغ, also Romanized as Qanāt Bāgh and Qanāt-i-Bāgh) is an ancient village in Aviz Rural District, in the Central District of Farashband County, Fars province, Iran. At the 2006 census, its population was 303, in 69 families.
