= Khormayak =

Khormayak خرمايك
- Village
- Location within Iran
- Coordinates: 28°44′44″N 52°05′58″E
- Country: Iran
- Province: Fars
- County: Farashband
- Bakhsh: Central
- Rural District: Aviz

Population (2006)
  - Total: 604
- Time zone: UTC+3:30 (IRST)
  - Summer (DST): UTC+4:30 (IRDT)

Khormayak (Persian: خرمايك, also Romanized as Khormāyak; also known as Khūmrīak) is a village in Aviz Rural District, in the Central District of Farashband County, Fars province, Iran. At the 2006 census, its population was 604, in 127 families.
