= Gonbad, Fars =

Gonbad گنبد
- Village
- Location within Iran
- Coordinates: 28°58′09″N 52°02′12″E
- Country: Iran
- Province: Fars
- County: Farashband
- Bakhsh: Central
- Rural District: Aviz

Population (2006)
  - Total: 112
- Time zone: UTC+3:30 (IRST)
  - Summer (DST): UTC+4:30 (IRDT)

Gonbad (Persian: گنبد; also known as Gombaz and Gunbad) is a village in Aviz Rural District, in the Central District of Farashband County, Fars province, Iran. At the 2006 census, its population was 112, in 24 families.
