= Bardaskan =

City in Razavi Khorasan province, Iran

Bardaskan Persian: بردسکن
- City
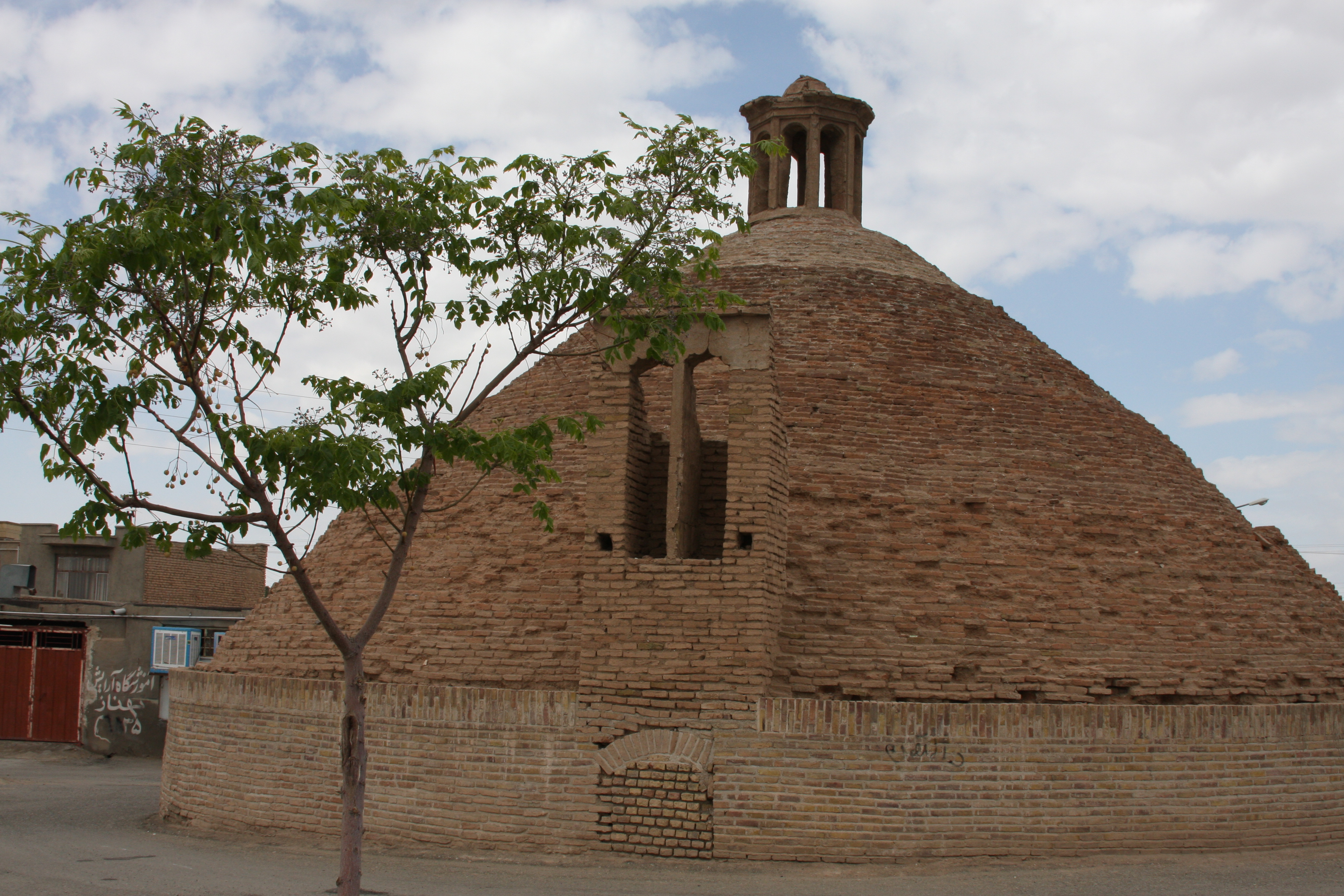
- Symbol of Bardaskan

- Location within Iran
- Coordinates: 35°15′45″N 57°58′13″E
- Country: Iran
- Province: Razavi Khorasan
- County: Bardaskan
- District: Central

Population (2016)
  - Total: 28,233
- Time zone: UTC+3:30 (IRST)
- Website: www.facebook.com/bardaskan

Bardaskan (Persian: بردسکن) (Note: Also romanized as Bardāskan and Bardeskan; also known as Badar Askān, Badr Eshkand, Bardāskand, and Bardeshkand) is a city in the Central District of Bardaskan County, Razavi Khorasan province, Iran, serving as capital of both the county and the district.

== Demographics ==
=== Population ===
At the time of the 2006 National Census, the city's population was 22,211 in 5,960 households. The following census in 2011 counted 26,107 people in 7,294 households. The 2016 census measured the population of the city as 28,233 people in 8,570 households.

== Overview ==
Bardeskan city is west of Mashhad, at the margin of the north part of the Namak Desert (salt desert). Its area is 8535 km^{2}. Altitude of Bardaskan is 985 meter. The weather in the north part of Bardaskan is cold and in the south and central parts changes from semi dry to hot and dry. Annual raining average is 150 mm. Bardaskan's temperature in the hottest summer day is nearly 45 °C And in the coldest winter night is −5 °C. There in not any permanent river in the Bardaskan but there are several seasonal rivers. Main jobs in Bardaskan are farming and animal husbandry. Staple crops in Bardaskan are wheat, barley, cotton, cumin seed, and pistachio, Saffron, pomegranate, fig and grape products. Neighboring cities by Bardaskan are sabzevar and neishabuor (in the North) Kashmar (in the east) Tabas (in the south) and Semnan (in the west).

== Historical sites, ancient artifacts and tourism ==
=== Sir Cave ===
Sir Cave is a cave in Sir village of the Central District of Bardaskan County in Razavi Khorasan Province. The cave was inhabited in the past and was used as a shelter. Sir Cave is located on a rocky mountain with a height of about 80 meters and about 1608 meters above sea level. It is difficult to reach.

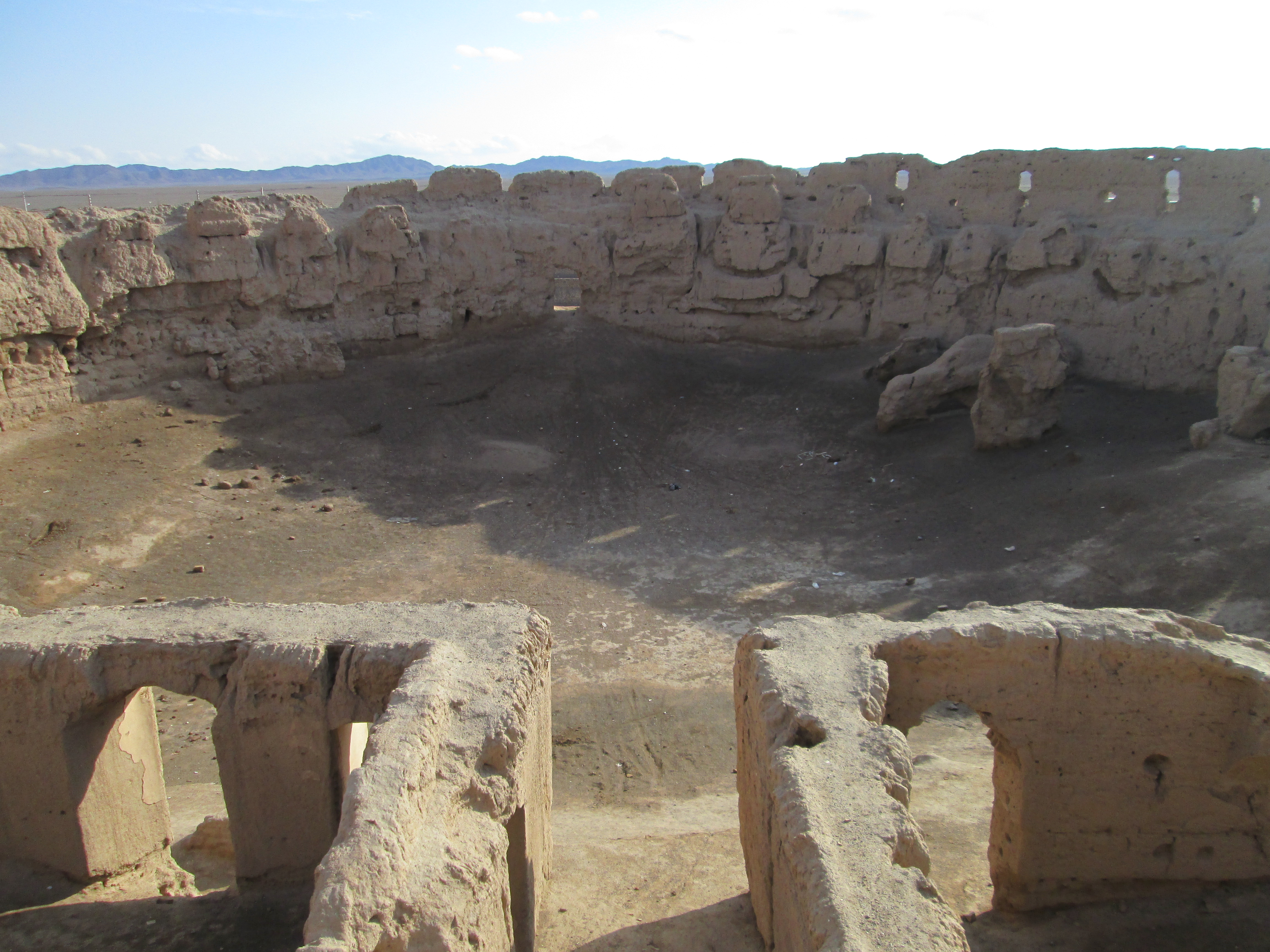
Rahmanniyeh castle

=== Rahmanniyeh Castle ===
Rahmanniyeh Castle is a historical castle located in Bardaskan County in Razavi Khorasan Province, The longevity of this fortress dates back to the 8th to 12th centuries AH.

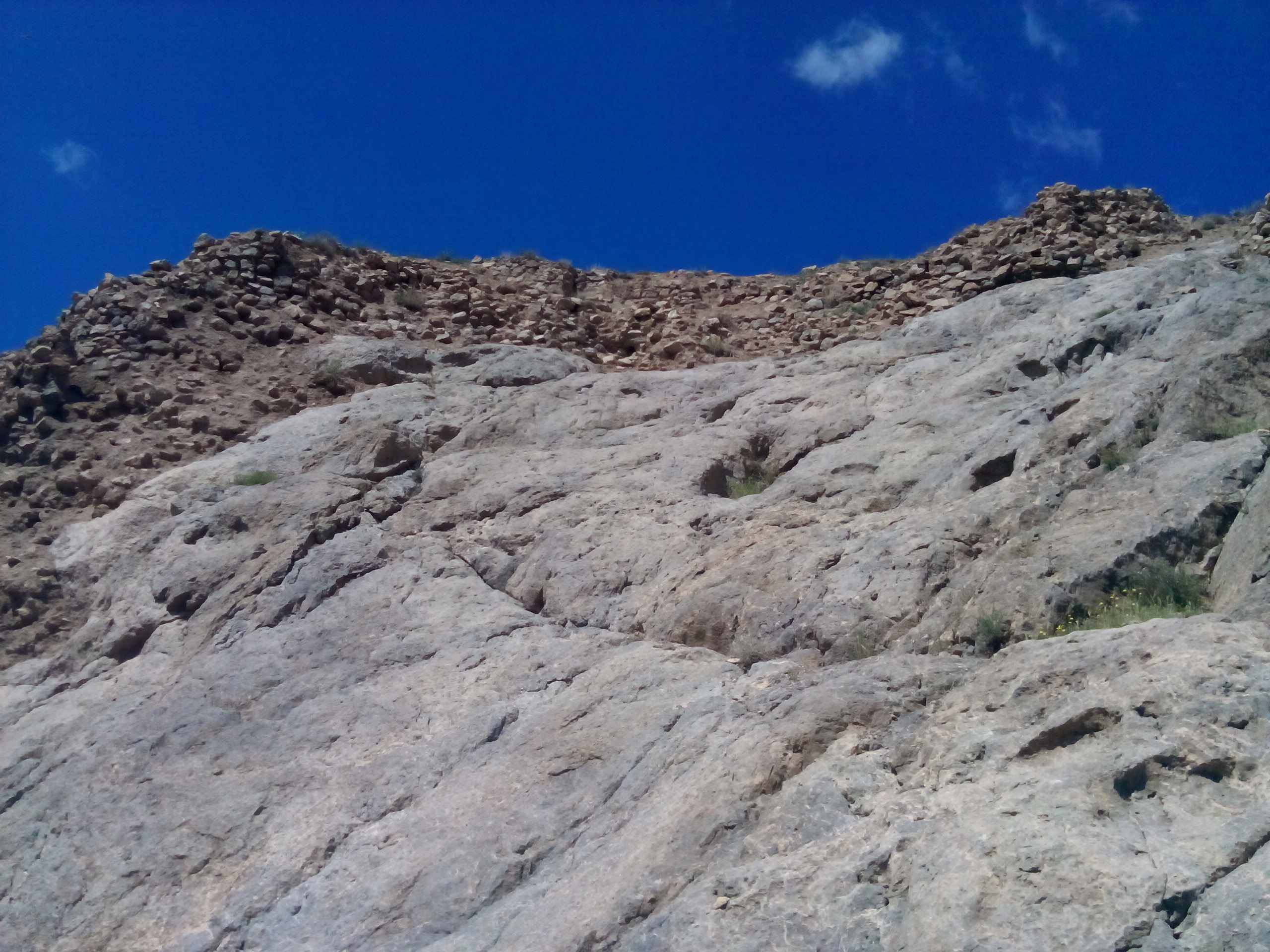
Qal'eh Dokhtar, Khooshab

=== Qal'eh Dokhtar, Khooshab ===
Qaleh Dokhtar is a historical castle located in Bardaskan County in Razavi Khorasan Province, The longevity of this fortress dates back to the 6th to 8th centuries AH.

=== Qal'eh Dokhtar, Doruneh ===
Qal'eh Dokhtar is a historical castle located in Bardaskan County in Razavi Khorasan Province, The longevity of this fortress dates back to the 6th to 9th centuries AH.

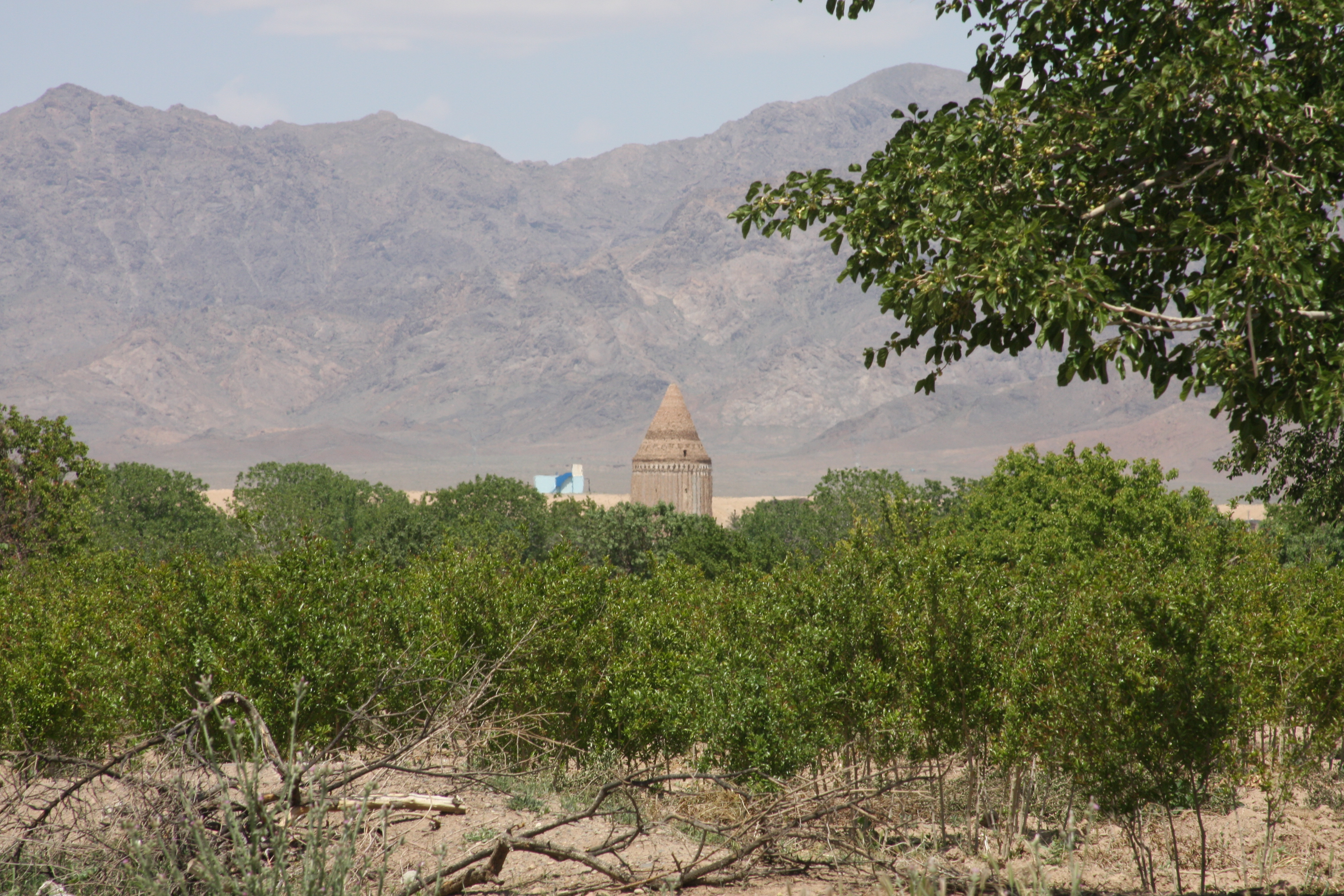
Aliabad Tower

=== Aliabad Tower ===
This tower is located in Aliabad-e Keshmar, 42 km from Kashmar city. This tower is built on the castle and its minaret is similar to the tower and its facade is made of decorative brick inlay. This dome is 18 meters. Tall with an octagonal interior. This tower is in the historical records.

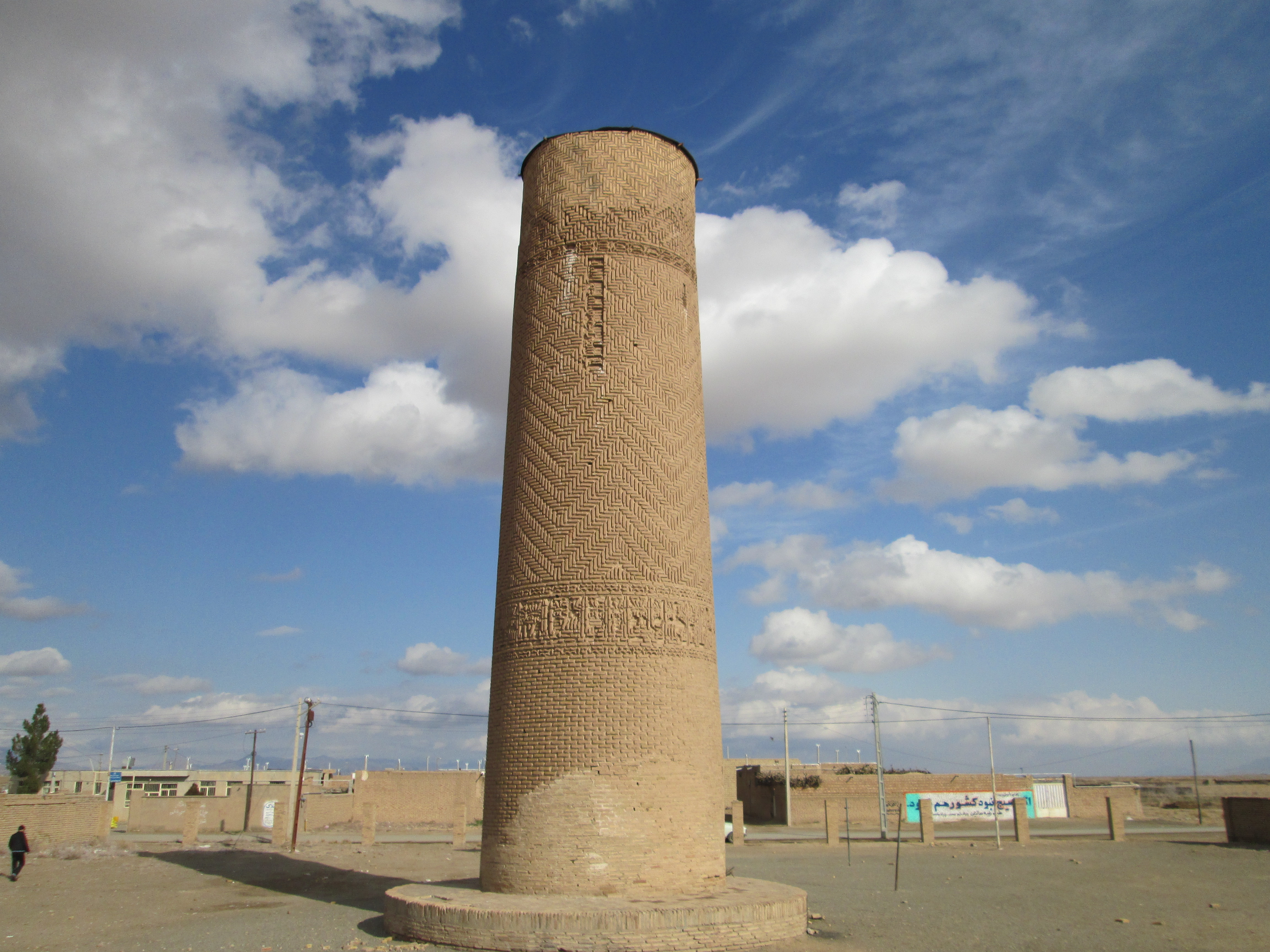
Firuzabad Tower

=== Firuzabad Tower ===
This minaret is made of brick and there are inscriptions on it called "Kufic" which dates back to the late 7th century AH. Although the minaret is made of simple brick - the bricks are laid in a zigzag pattern to enhance its beauty. Inside the minaret, the remains of a staircase can be seen and holes are inscribed on the minaret. Currently, this minaret is 18 meters high.

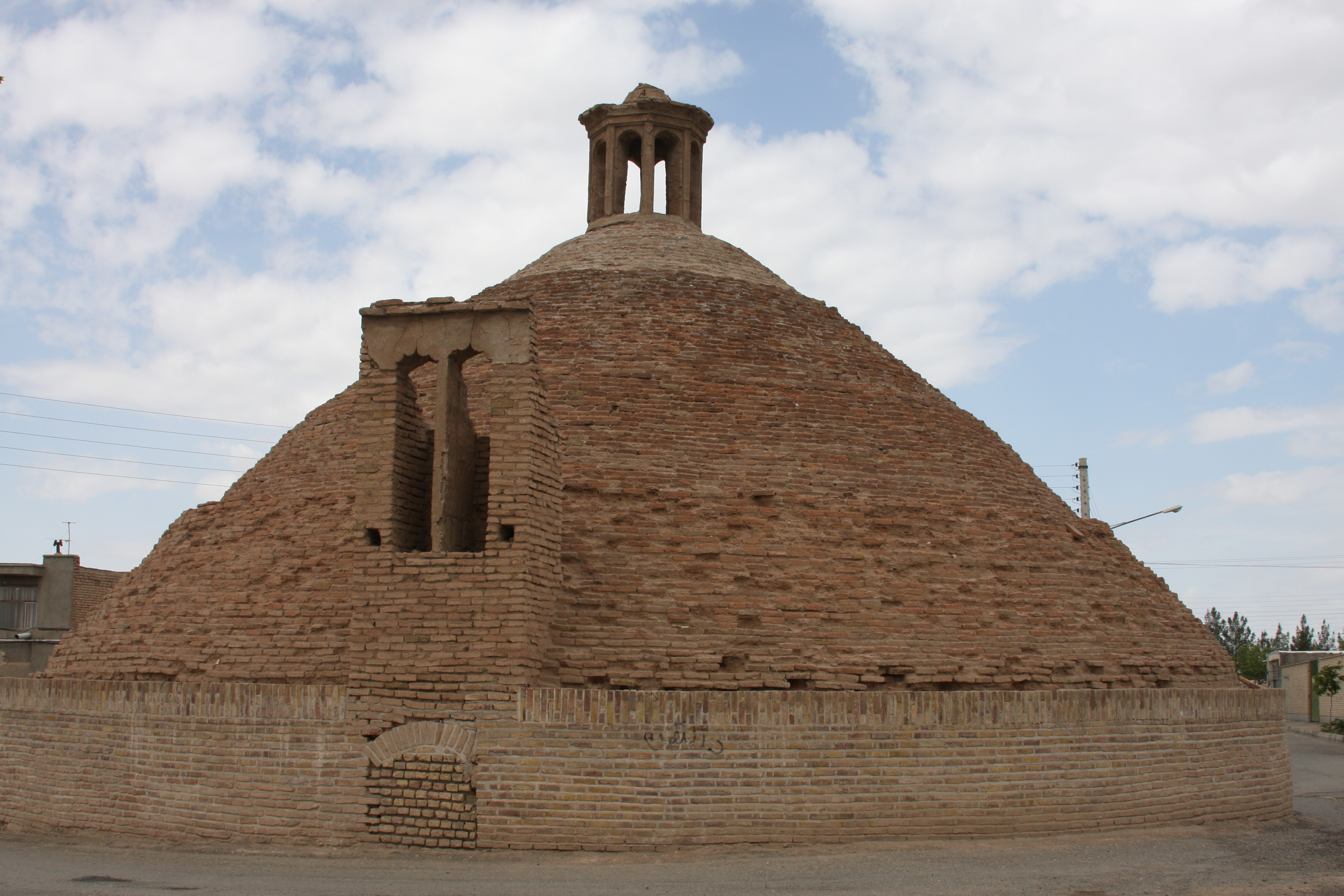
Seyyed Bagher Ab anbar

=== Seyyed Bagher Ab anbar ===
The Seyed Bagher Ab anbar is a historical Ab anbar of Qajar dynasty that is located in city center of Bardaskan, in Ghaem Avenue. This Ab anbar was added to the list of National Monuments of Iran As the 11034st monument.

=== Firuzabad area ===
The Firuzabad area is a historical area related to the pre-Islamic period and is located in Bardaskan County, Central District, Firuzabad village.

=== Darone Cave ===
Darone Cave is a cave in Bardaskan County, Iran. It is located in Cave Doruneh, Bardaskan.

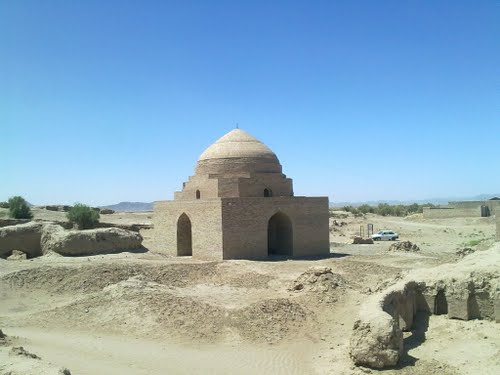
Tomb of Abdolabad

=== Ribat of Kabudan ===
Ribat of Kabudan is a historical Ribat related to the Qajar dynasty and is located in Kabudan, Razavi Khorasan Province.

=== Tomb of Abdolabad ===
The Tomb of Abdolabad is a historical tomb and chahartaqi of Ilkhanate era in Abdolabad village at Bardaskan County.The tomb was added to the list of National Monuments of Iran as the 10,908th monument.

== Gallery ==
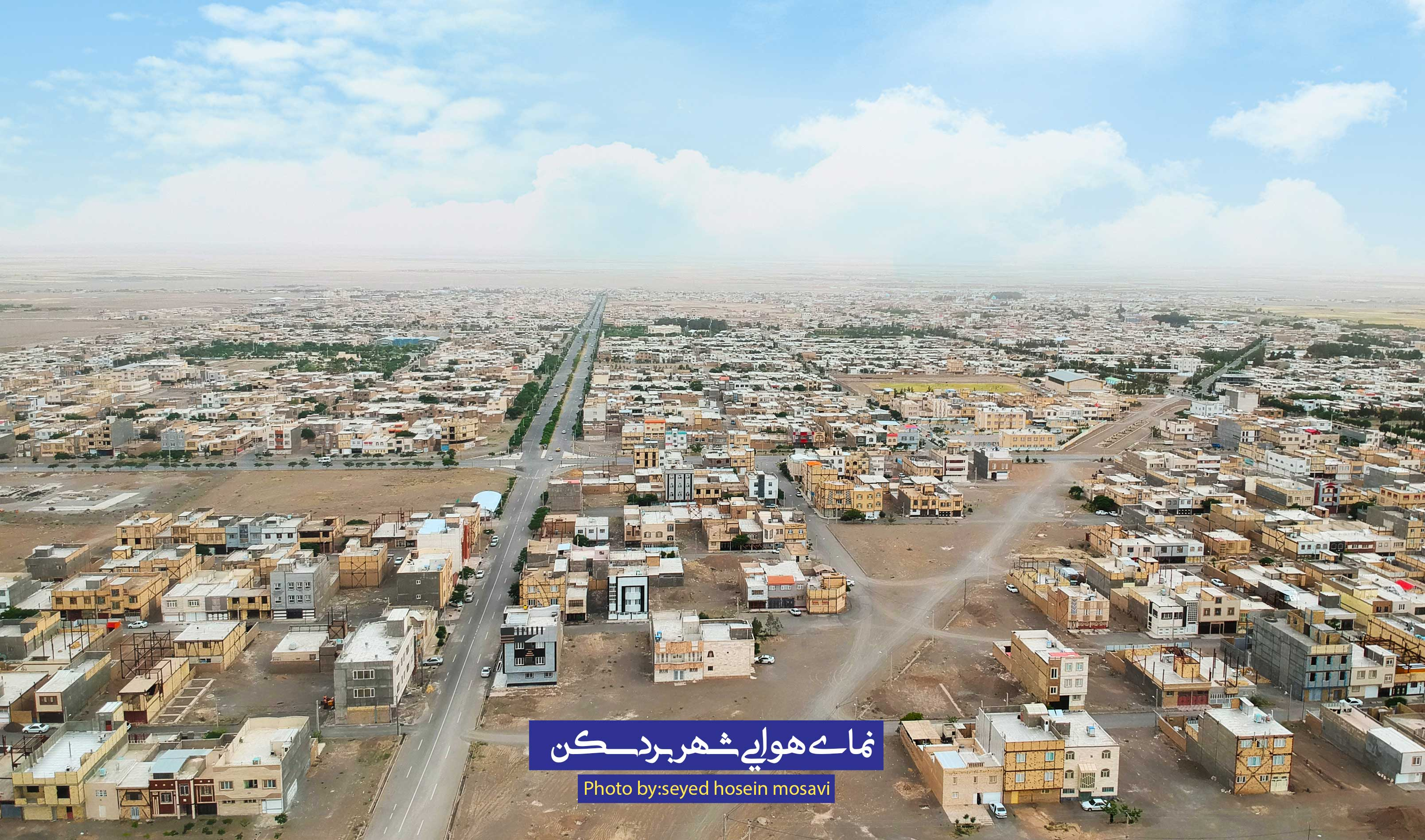
Aerial view of the city

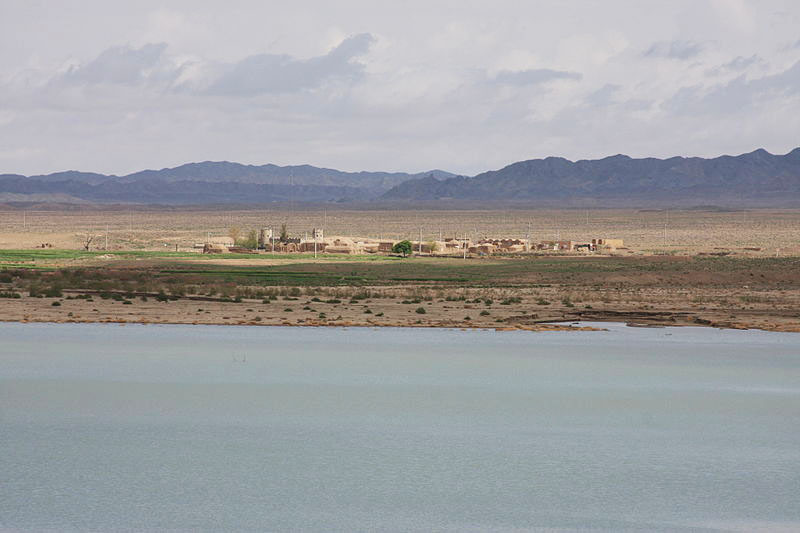
Dahan Ghaleh Dam

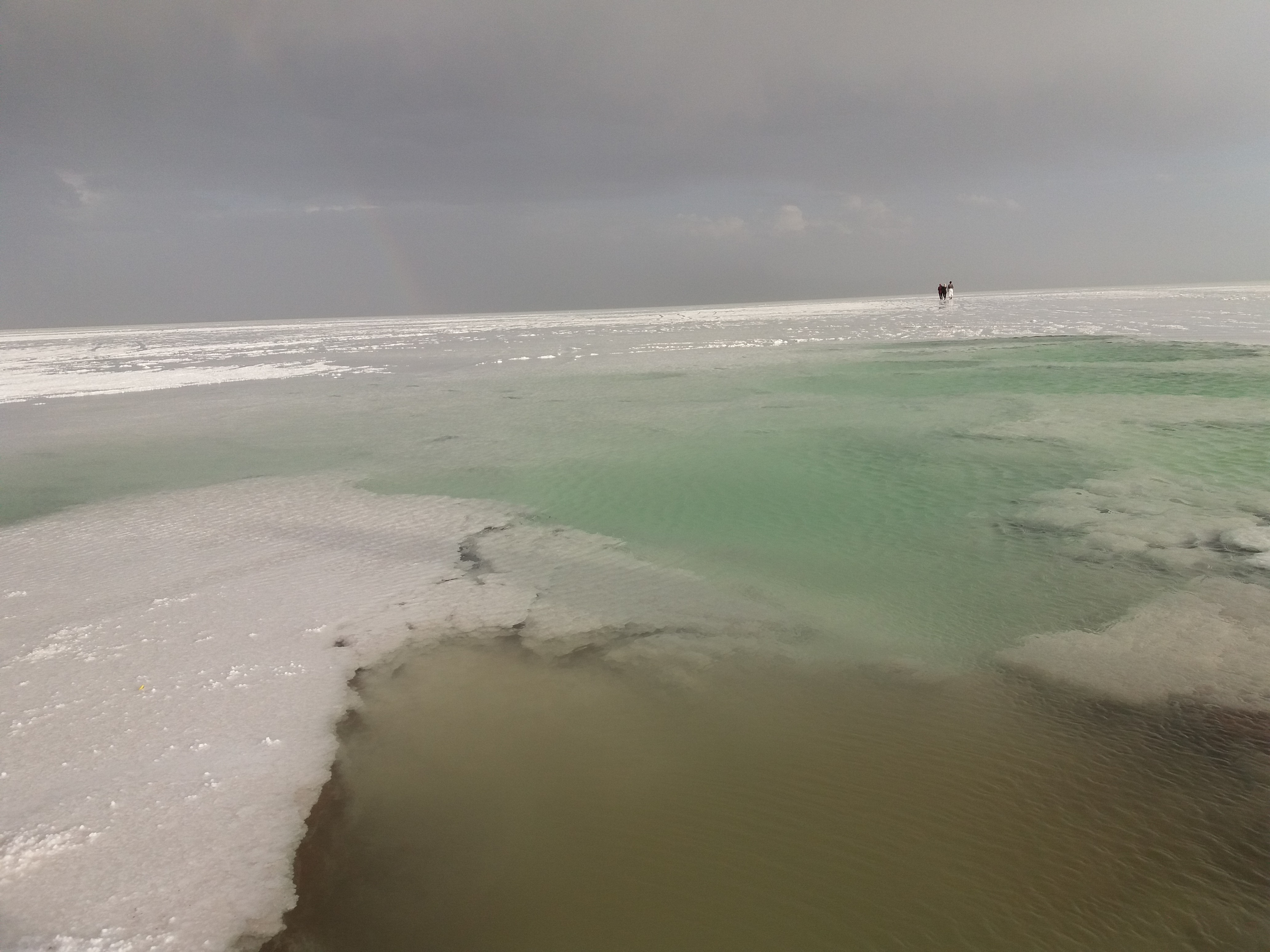
Bardaskan Playa

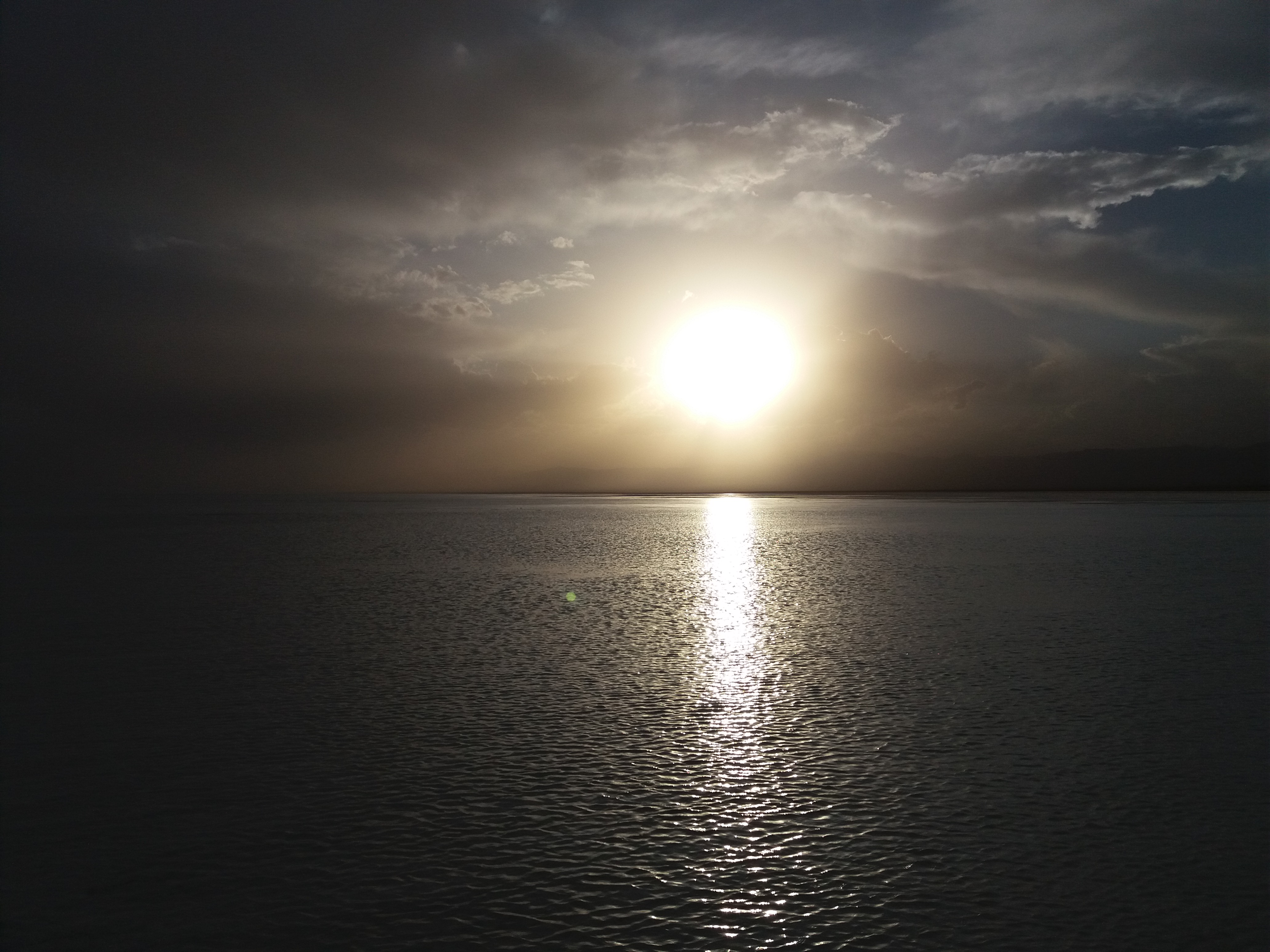
Bardaskan Playa

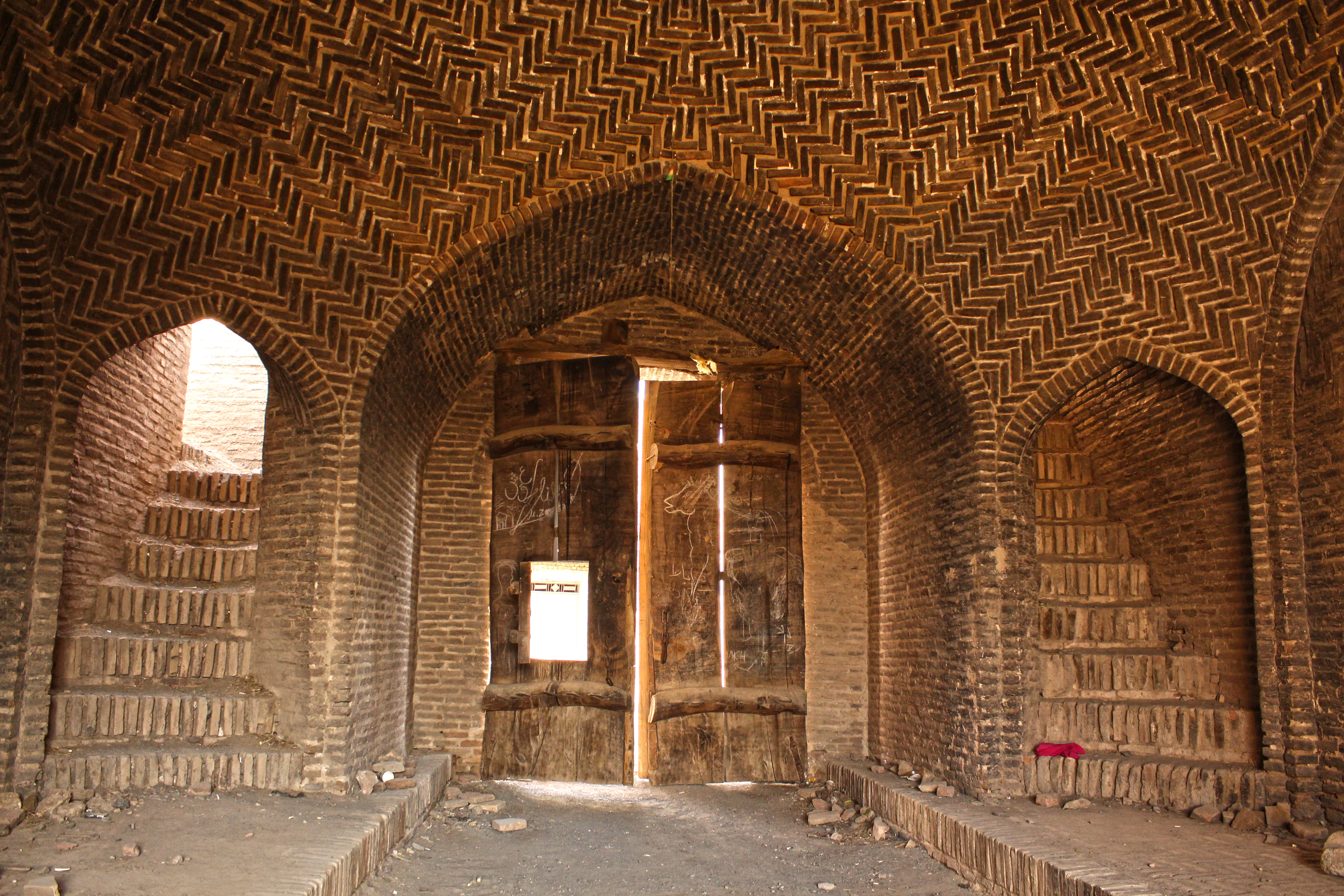
Ribat-i Kabudan

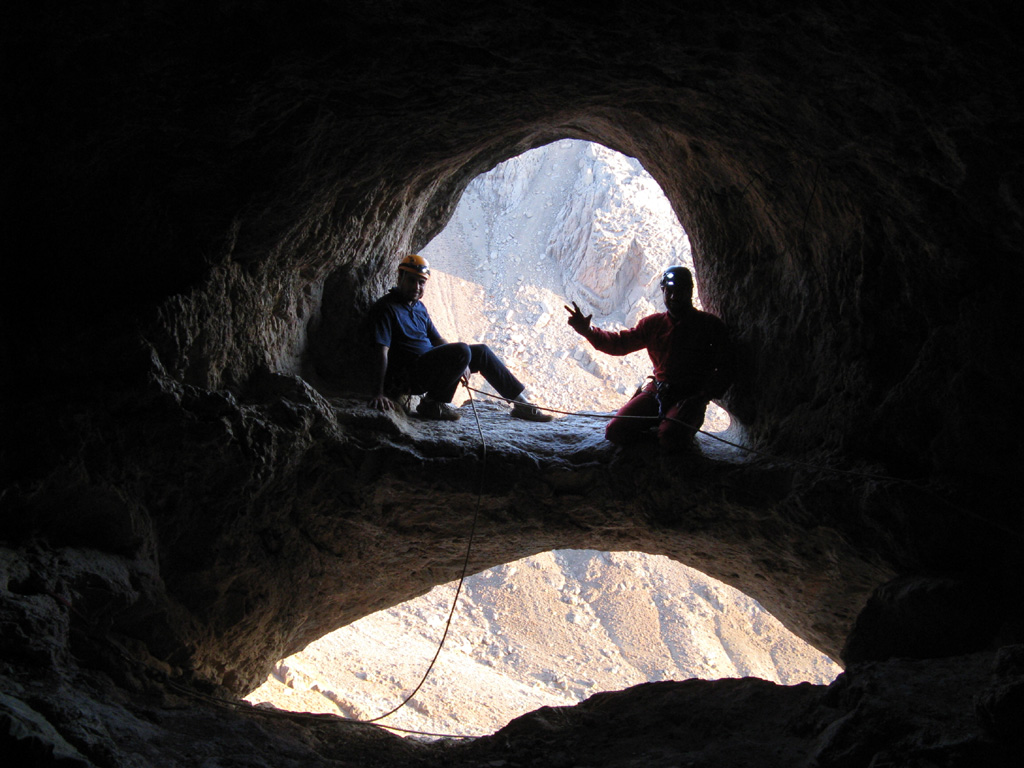
Sir Cave

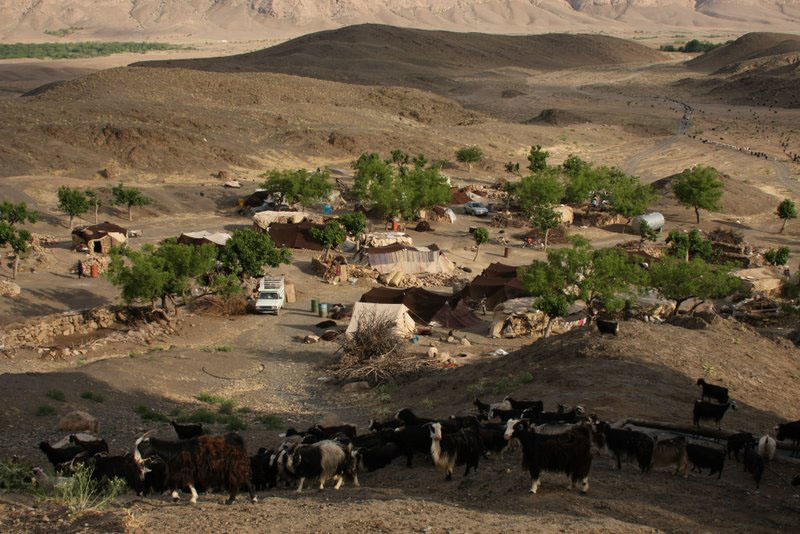
Nomads of Bardaskan

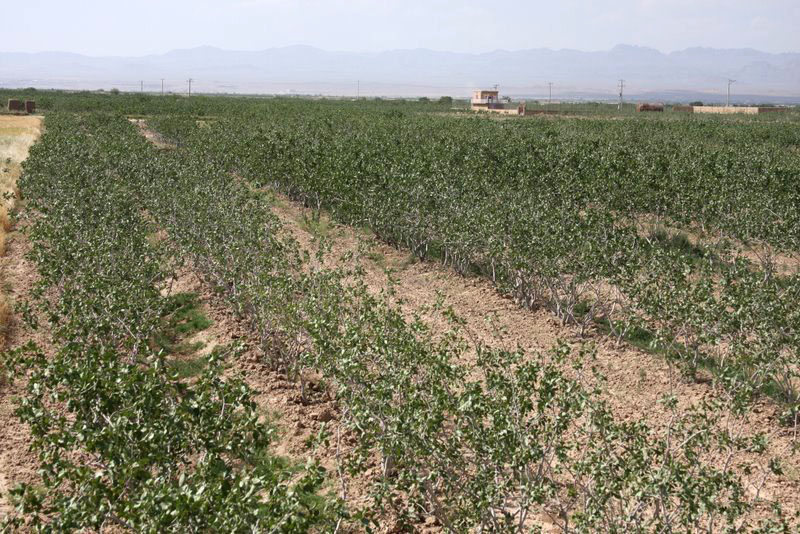
Farms

Media related to Bardaskan at Wikimedia Commons
