= Balutabad =

Balutabad بلوطاباد
- Village
- Location within Iran
- Coordinates: 28°55′02″N 51°59′16″E
- Country: Iran
- Province: Fars
- County: Farashband
- Bakhsh: Central
- Rural District: Aviz

Population (2006)
  - Total: 270
- Time zone: UTC+3:30 (IRST)
  - Summer (DST): UTC+4:30 (IRDT)

Balutabad (Persian: بلوطاباد, also Romanized as Balūţābād) is a village in Aviz Rural District, in the Central District of Farashband County, Fars province, Iran. At the 2006 census, its population was 270, in 57 families.
