= Pahna Pahn =

Pahna Pahn پهناپهن
- Village
- Location within Iran
- Coordinates: 28°58′16″N 51°57′31″E
- Country: Iran
- Province: Fars
- County: Farashband
- Bakhsh: Central
- Rural District: Aviz

Population (2006)
  - Total: 372
- Time zone: UTC+3:30 (IRST)
  - Summer (DST): UTC+4:30 (IRDT)

Pahna Pahn (Persian: پهناپهن, also Romanized as Pahnā Pahn; also known as Paha Pahn) is a village in Aviz Rural District, in the Central District of Farashband County, Fars province, Iran. At the 2006 census, its population was 372, in 86 families.
