= Konar Malek =

Konar Malek كنارمالك
- Village
- Location within Iran
- Coordinates: 28°49′27″N 52°07′30″E
- Country: Iran
- Province: Fars
- County: Farashband
- Bakhsh: Central
- Rural District: Aviz

Population (2006)
  - Total: 871
- Time zone: UTC+3:30 (IRST)
  - Summer (DST): UTC+4:30 (IRDT)

Konar Malek (Persian: كنارمالك, also Romanized as Konār Mālek) is a village in Aviz Rural District, in the Central District of Farashband County, Fars province, Iran. At the 2006 census, its population was 871, in 180 families.
