= Qardashabad =

Qardashabad قرداش اباد
- Village
- Location within Iran
- Coordinates: 29°05′21″N 52°03′57″E
- Country: Iran
- Province: Fars
- County: Farashband
- Bakhsh: Central
- Rural District: Nujin

Population (2006)
  - Total: 115
- Time zone: UTC+3:30 (IRST)
  - Summer (DST): UTC+4:30 (IRDT)

Qardashabad (Persian: قرداش اباد, also Romanized as Qardashābād) is a village in Nujin Rural District, in the Central District of Farashband County, Fars province, Iran. At the 2006 census, its population was 115, in 24 families.
