= Gowri, Fars =

Gowri گوري
- Village
- Location within Iran
- Coordinates: 28°10′51″N 52°19′47″E
- Country: Iran
- Province: Fars
- County: Farashband
- Bakhsh: Dehram
- Rural District: Dezh Gah

Population (2006)
  - Total: 635
- Time zone: UTC+3:30 (IRST)
  - Summer (DST): UTC+4:30 (IRDT)

Gowri (Persian: گوري, also Romanized as Gowrī and Gūrī; also known as Kūrī) is a village in Dezh Gah Rural District, Dehram District, Farashband County, Fars province, Iran. At the 2006 census, its population was 635, in 129 families.
