= Savar-e Gheyb =

Savar-e Gheyb سوارغيب
- Village
- Location within Iran
- Coordinates: 28°11′32″N 52°20′07″E
- Country: Iran
- Province: Fars
- County: Farashband
- Bakhsh: Dehram
- Rural District: Dezh Gah

Population (2006)
  - Total: 158
- Time zone: UTC+3:30 (IRST)
  - Summer (DST): UTC+4:30 (IRDT)

Savar-e Gheyb (Persian: سوارغيب, also Romanized as Savār-e Gheyb and Savārgheyb) is a village in Dezh Gah Rural District, Dehram District, Farashband County, Fars province, Iran. At the 2006 census, its population was 158, in 31 families.
