= Khur, Farashband =

Khur خور
- Village
- Location within Iran
- Coordinates: 28°50′21″N 52°19′12″E
- Country: Iran
- Province: Fars
- County: Farashband
- Bakhsh: Central
- Rural District: Nujin

Population (2006)
  - Total: 186
- Time zone: UTC+3:30 (IRST)
  - Summer (DST): UTC+4:30 (IRDT)

Khur (Persian: خور, also Romanized as Khūr) is a village in Nujin Rural District, in the Central District of Farashband County, Fars province, Iran. At the 2006 census, its population was 186, in 45 families.
