= Dezh Gah =

Dozh Gah دژگاه
- Village
- Location within Iran
- Coordinates: 28°09′47″N 52°15′14″E
- Country: Iran
- Province: Fars
- County: Farashband
- Bakhsh: Dehram
- Rural District: Dezh Gah

Population (2006)
  - Total: 268
- Time zone: UTC+3:30 (IRST)
  - Summer (DST): UTC+4:30 (IRDT)

Dezh Gah (Persian: دژگاه, also romanized as Dezh Gāh; also known as Dozgāh) is a village in Dezh Gah Rural District, Dehram District, Farashband County, Fars province, Iran. At the 2006 census, its population was 268, in 70 families.
