= Barmah, Iran =

Barmah برمه
- Village
- Country: Iran
- Province: Fars
- County: Farashband
- Bakhsh: Central
- Rural District: Aviz

Population (2006)
  - Total: 33
- Time zone: UTC+3:30 (IRST)
  - Summer (DST): UTC+4:30 (IRDT)

Barmah (Persian: برمه) is a village in Aviz Rural District, in the Central District of Farashband County, Fars province, Iran. At the 2006 census, its population was 33, in 5 families.
