= Tol-e Geli =

Tol-e Geli تل گلي
- Village
- Location within Iran
- Coordinates: 28°57′11″N 51°57′53″E
- Country: Iran
- Province: Fars
- County: Farashband
- Bakhsh: Central
- Rural District: Aviz

Population (2006)
  - Total: 168
- Time zone: UTC+3:30 (IRST)
  - Summer (DST): UTC+4:30 (IRDT)

Tol-e Geli (Persian: تل گلي, also Romanized as Tol-e Gelī) is a village in Aviz Rural District, in the Central District of Farashband County, Fars province, Iran. At the 2006 census, its population was 168, in 28 families.
