= Khani Yek =

Khani Yek خاني يك
- Village
- Location within Iran
- Coordinates: 29°04′01″N 52°02′02″E
- Country: Iran
- Province: Fars
- County: Farashband
- Bakhsh: Central
- Rural District: Nujin

Population (2006)
  - Total: 764
- Time zone: UTC+3:30 (IRST)
  - Summer (DST): UTC+4:30 (IRDT)

Khani Yek (Persian: خاني يك, also Romanized as Khānī Yek and Khānīyak; also known as Khāmīk, Khamyak, Khāneh Yak, and Khānīk) is a village in Nujin Rural District, in the Central District of Farashband County, Fars province, Iran. At the 2006 census, its population was 764, in 161 families.
