= Khvosh Ab, Farashband =

Khvosh Ab خوشاب
- Village
- Location within Iran
- Coordinates: 29°00′15″N 52°05′59″E
- Country: Iran
- Province: Fars
- County: Farashband
- Bakhsh: Central
- Rural District: Nujin

Population (2006)
  - Total: 473
- Time zone: UTC+3:30 (IRST)
  - Summer (DST): UTC+4:30 (IRDT)

Khvosh Ab (Persian: خوشاب, also Romanized as Khvosh Āb, Khowshāb, and Khūshāb) is a village in Nujin Rural District, in the Central District of Farashband County, Fars province, Iran. At the 2006 census, its population was 473, in 122 families.
