= Bar Cheshmeh =

Bar Cheshmeh برچشمه
- Village
- Country: Iran
- Province: Fars
- County: Farashband
- Bakhsh: Central
- Rural District: Aviz

Population (2006)
  - Total: 150
- Time zone: UTC+3:30 (IRST)
  - Summer (DST): UTC+4:30 (IRDT)

Bar Cheshmeh (Persian: برچشمه) is a village in Aviz Rural District, in the Central District of Farashband County, Fars province, Iran. At the 2006 census, its population was 150, in 29 families.
