= Khalji, Iran =

Khalji خلجي
- Village
- Location within Iran
- Coordinates: 29°01′40″N 51°54′36″E
- Country: Iran
- Province: Fars
- County: Farashband
- Bakhsh: Central
- Rural District: Aviz

Population (2006)
  - Total: 101
- Time zone: UTC+3:30 (IRST)
  - Summer (DST): UTC+4:30 (IRDT)

Khalji (Persian: خلجي, also Romanized as Khaljī; also known as Mazra‘eh-ye Khaljī) is a village in Aviz Rural District, in the Central District of Farashband County, Fars province, Iran. At the 2006 census, its population was 101, in 26 families.
