= Chah Shuli =

Chah Shuli چاه شولي
- Village
- Location within Iran
- Coordinates: 28°53′34″N 51°59′17″E
- Country: Iran
- Province: Fars
- County: Farashband
- Bakhsh: Central
- Rural District: Aviz

Population (2006)
  - Total: 335
- Time zone: UTC+3:30 (IRST)
  - Summer (DST): UTC+4:30 (IRDT)

Chah Shuli (Persian: چاه شولي, also Romanized as Chāh Shūlī and Chāhshūlī) is a village in Aviz Rural District, in the Central District of Farashband County, Fars province, Iran. At the 2006 census, its population was 335, in 76 families.
