= Ab-e Gandu =

Ab-e Gandu ابگندو
- Village
- Location within Iran
- Coordinates: 29°08′23″N 51°59′22″E
- Country: Iran
- Province: Fars
- County: Farashband
- Bakhsh: Central
- Rural District: Nujin

Population (2006)
  - Total: 101
- Time zone: UTC+3:30 (IRST)
  - Summer (DST): UTC+4:30 (IRDT)

Ab-e Gandu (Persian: ابگندو, also Romanized as Āb-e Gandū; also known as Āb Gandeh, Āb-i-Gandeh, Āb Kandeh, Āb Kandū, and Āb Qandū) is a village in Nujin Rural District, in the Central District of Farashband County, Fars province, Iran. At the 2006 census, its population was 101, in 26 families.
