= Abnow =

Abnow or Ab-e Now or Abnu (Persian: ابنو) may refer to:

- Abnow, Fars
- Ab-e Now, Farashband, Fars Province
- Abnow, Razavi Khorasan
