= Jowhari, Farashband =

Jowhari جوهري
- Village
- Location within Iran
- Coordinates: 28°08′48″N 52°15′30″E
- Country: Iran
- Province: Fars
- County: Farashband
- Bakhsh: Dehram
- Rural District: Dezh Gah

Population (2106)
  - Total: 316
- Time zone: UTC+3:30 (IRST)
  - Summer (DST): UTC+4:30 (IRDT)

Jowhari (Persian: جوهري, also Romanized as Jowharī) is a village in Dezh Gah Rural District, Dehram District, Farashband County, Fars province, Iran. At the 2006 census, its population was 316, in 58 families.
