= Bachan, Iran =

Bachan باچان
- Village
- Location within Iran
- Coordinates: 28°55′55″N 52°14′41″E
- Country: Iran
- Province: Fars
- County: Farashband
- Bakhsh: Central
- Rural District: Nujin

Population (2006)
  - Total: 284
- Time zone: UTC+3:30 (IRST)
  - Summer (DST): UTC+4:30 (IRDT)

Bachan (Persian: باچان, also Romanized as Bāchān; also known as Bachoon and Bāchūn) is a village in Nujin Rural District, in the Central District of Farashband County, Fars province, Iran. At the 2006 census, its population was 284, in 60 families.
