= Dowlatabad, Farashband =

Village in Fars province, Iran

Dowlatabad Persian: دولتاباد
- Village
- Location within Iran
- Coordinates: 28°08′42″N 52°16′10″E
- Country: Iran
- Province: Fars
- County: Farashband
- District: Dehram
- Rural District: Dezh Gah

Population (2016)
  - Total: 951
- Time zone: UTC+3:30 (IRST)

Dowlatabad (Persian: دولتاباد) (Note: Also romanized as Daulatābād and Dowlatābād; also known as Dowlat Abad Dezhgah) is a village in, and the capital of, Dezh Gah Rural District of Dehram District, Farashband County, Fars province, Iran.

== Demographics ==
=== Population ===
At the time of the 2006 National Census, the village's population was 792 in 164 households. The following census in 2011 counted 774 people in 186 households. The 2016 census measured the population of the village as 951 people in 252 households. It was the most populous village in its rural district.
