= Deh Gah, Farashband =

Deh Gah دهگاه
- Village
- Location within Iran
- Coordinates: 28°29′19″N 52°15′30″E
- Country: Iran
- Province: Fars
- County: Farashband
- Bakhsh: Dehram
- Rural District: Dehram

Population (2006)
  - Total: 187
- Time zone: UTC+3:30 (IRST)
  - Summer (DST): UTC+4:30 (IRDT)

Deh Gah (Persian: دهگاه, also Romanized as Deh Gāh; also known as Dehgā) is a village in Dehram Rural District, Dehram District, Farashband County, Fars province, Iran. At the 2006 census, its population was 187, in 41 families.
