= Alamdan-e Olya =

Alamdan-e Olya علمدان عليا
- Village
- Location within Iran
- Coordinates: 28°09′00″N 52°14′44″E
- Country: Iran
- Province: Fars
- County: Farashband
- Bakhsh: Dehram
- Rural District: Dezh Gah

Population (2006)
  - Total: 209
- Time zone: UTC+3:30 (IRST)
  - Summer (DST): UTC+4:30 (IRDT)

Alamdan-e Olya (Persian: علمدان عليا, also Romanized as 'Alamdān-e 'Olyā; also known as 'Alamdān-e Bālā) is a village in Dezh Gah Rural District, Dehram District, Farashband County, Fars province, Iran. At the 2006 census, its population was 209, in 49 families.
