= Aq Mahdi =

Coordinates: 37°18′26″N 49°19′57″E

Aq Mahdi اق مهدي
- Village
- Interactive map of Aq Mahdi
- Country: Iran
- Province: Razavi Khorasan
- County: Bardaskan
- Bakhsh: Central
- Rural District: Kuhpayeh

Population (2006)
  - Total: 124
- Time zone: UTC+3:30 (IRST)
  - Summer (DST): UTC+4:30 (IRDT)

Aq Mahdi (Persian: اق مهدي, also Romanized as Āq Mahdī) is a village in Kuhpayeh Rural District Rural District, in the Central District of Bardaskan County, Razavi Khorasan Province, Iran. At the 2006 census, its population was 124, in 31 families.

== See also ==
- List of cities, towns and villages in Razavi Khorasan Province
