= Kuraki, Iran =

Kuraki or Koorki or Kowraki (Persian: كوركي) in Iran may refer to:

- Kuraki, Farashband
- Kuraki, Khonj
- Kowraki, Shiraz
- Korki (disambiguation)
