= Mansurabad, Farashband =

Village in Fars province, Iran

Mansurabad Persian: منصوراباد
- Village
- Location within Iran
- Coordinates: 29°08′32″N 52°00′44″E
- Country: Iran
- Province: Fars
- County: Farashband
- District: Central
- Rural District: Nujin

Population (2016)
  - Total: 929
- Time zone: UTC+3:30 (IRST)

Mansurabad (Persian: منصوراباد) (Note: Also romanized as Manşūrābād) is a village in Nujin Rural District of the Central District of Farashband County, Fars province, Iran.

== Demographics ==
=== Population ===
At the time of the 2006 National Census, the village's population was 1,071 in 198 households. The following census in 2011 counted 961 people in 207 households. The 2016 census measured the population of the village as 929 people in 226 households. It was the most populous village in its rural district.
