= Ahmadabad, Farashband =

Village in Fars province, Iran

Ahmadabad Persian: احمداباد
- Village
- Location within Iran
- Coordinates: 28°26′47″N 52°22′09″E
- Country: Iran
- Province: Fars
- County: Farashband
- District: Dehram
- Rural District: Dehram

Population (2016)
  - Total: 674
- Time zone: UTC+3:30 (IRST)

Ahmadabad (Persian: احمداباد) (Note: Also romanized as Aḩmadābād; also known as Ahmad Abad Arba’eh) is a village in Dehram Rural District of Dehram District, Farashband County, Fars province, Iran.

== Demographics ==
=== Population ===
At the time of the 2006 National Census, the village's population was 814 in 176 households. The following census in 2011 counted 811 people in 200 households. The 2016 census measured the population of the village as 674 people in 180 households. It was the most populous village in its rural district.
