= Aviz, Fars =

Village in Fars province, Iran

Aviz Persian: اويز
- Village
- Location within Iran
- Coordinates: 28°54′59″N 52°03′25″E
- Country: Iran
- Province: Fars
- County: Farashband
- District: Central
- Rural District: Aviz

Population (2016)
  - Total: 1,389
- Time zone: UTC+3:30 (IRST)

Aviz (Persian: اويز) (Note: Also romanized as Āvīz) is a village in, and the capital of, Aviz Rural District of the Central District of Farashband County, Fars province, Iran.

== Demographics ==
=== Population ===
At the time of the 2006 National Census, the village's population was 1,454 in 307 households. The following census in 2011 counted 1,386 people in 376 households. The 2016 census measured the population of the village as 1,389 people in 403 households. It was the most populous village in its rural district.
