= Ahubam =

Ahubam اهوبم
- Village
- Location within Iran
- Coordinates: 35°22′34″N 58°02′10″E
- Country: Iran
- Province: Razavi Khorasan
- County: Bardaskan
- Bakhsh: Central
- Rural District: Kuhpayeh

Population (2006)
  - Total: 133
- Time zone: UTC+3:30 (IRST)
  - Summer (DST): UTC+4:30 (IRDT)

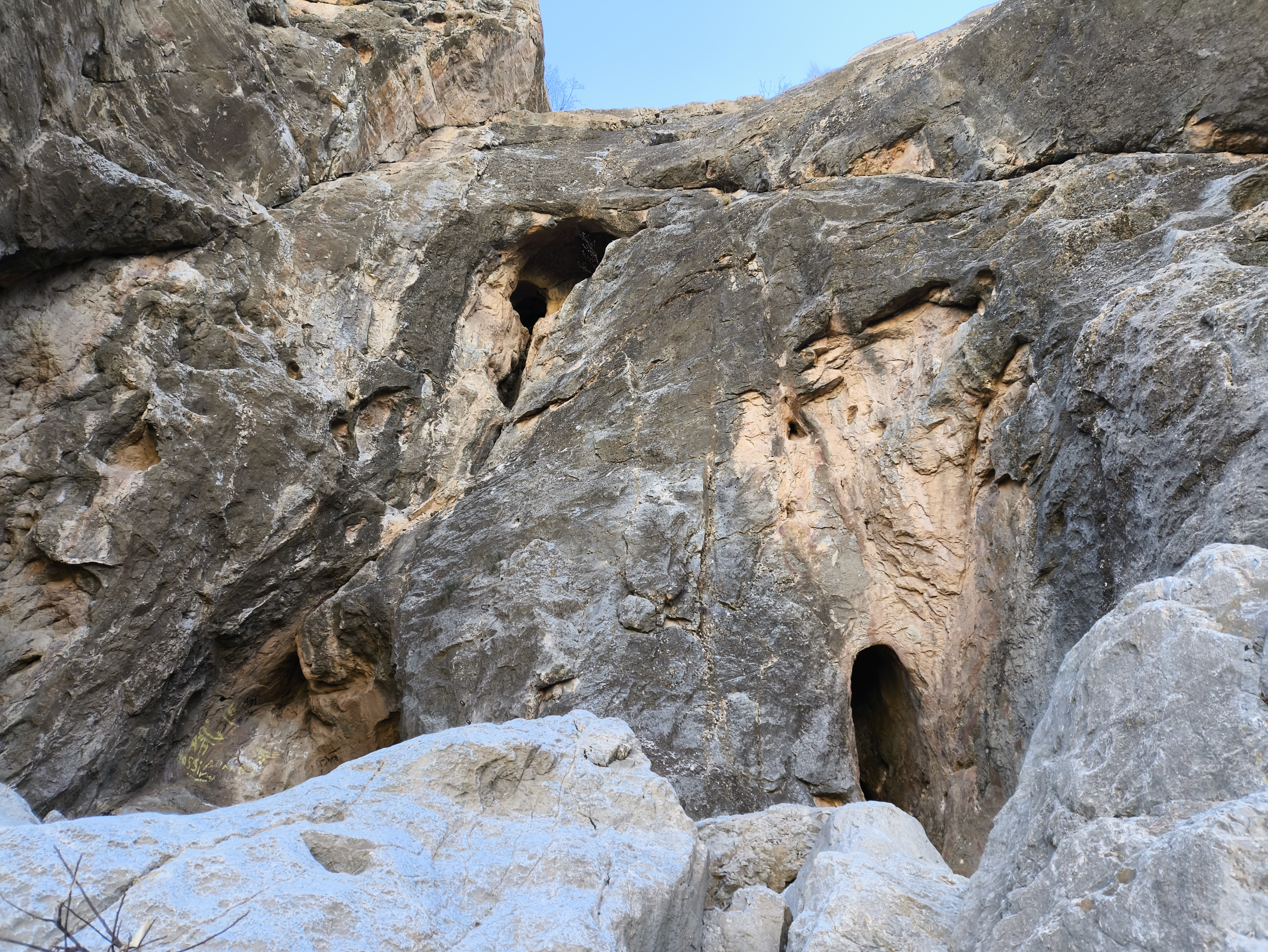
Ahubam Cave in 2024.

Ahubam (Persian: اهوبم, also Romanized as Āhūbam, Ahoobam, and Āhū Bam) is a village in Kuhpayeh Rural District Rural District, in the Central District of Bardaskan County, Razavi Khorasan Province, Iran. At the 2006 census, its population was 133, in 51 families.

== See also ==
- List of cities, towns and villages in Razavi Khorasan Province
