= Kuraki, Farashband =

Kuraki كوركي
- Village
- Location within Iran
- Coordinates: 29°01′47″N 51°58′23″E
- Country: Iran
- Province: Fars
- County: Farashband
- Bakhsh: Central
- Rural District: Aviz

Population (2006)
  - Total: 331
- Time zone: UTC+3:30 (IRST)
  - Summer (DST): UTC+4:30 (IRDT)

Kuraki (Persian: كوركي, also Romanized as Kūrakī) is a village in Aviz Rural District, in the Central District of Farashband County, Fars province, Iran. At the 2006 census, its population was 331, in 67 families.
