= Ab-e Now-e Khani Yek =

Ab-e Now-e Khani Yek ابنوخاني يك
- Village
- Location within Iran
- Coordinates: 29°04′44″N 52°02′06″E
- Country: Iran
- Province: Fars
- County: Farashband
- Bakhsh: Central
- Rural District: Nujin

Population (2006)
  - Total: 80
- Time zone: UTC+3:30 (IRST)
  - Summer (DST): UTC+4:30 (IRDT)

Ab-e Now-e Khani Yek (Persian: ابنوخاني يك, also Romanized as Āb-e Now Khānī Yek; also known as Āb-e Now) is a village in Nujin Rural District, in the Central District of Farashband County, Fars province, Iran. At the 2006 census, its population was 80, in 19 families.
