= Khooshab, Bardaskan =

Khvoshab خوشاب
- Village
- Location within Iran
- Coordinates: 35°25′50″N 58°10′32″E
- Country: Iran
- Province: Razavi Khorasan
- County: Bardaskan
- Bakhsh: Central
- Rural District: Kuhpayeh

Population (2006)
  - Total: 204
- Time zone: UTC+3:30 (IRST)
  - Summer (DST): UTC+4:30 (IRDT)

Khvoshab (Persian: خوشاب, also Romanized as Khvoshāb, Khoshāb, and Khowshāb) is a village in Kuhpayeh Rural District Rural District, in the Central District of Bardaskan County, Razavi Khorasan Province, Iran. At the 2006 census, its population was 204, in 65 families. by sadegh jalili
