= Alamdan-e Sofla =

Alamdan-e Sofla علمدان سفلي
- Village
- Location within Iran
- Coordinates: 28°08′47″N 52°15′38″E
- Country: Iran
- Province: Fars
- County: Farashband
- Bakhsh: Dehram
- Rural District: Dezh Gah

Population (2006)
  - Total: 168
- Time zone: UTC+3:30 (IRST)
  - Summer (DST): UTC+4:30 (IRDT)

Alamdan-e Sofla (Persian: علمدان سفلي, also Romanized as 'Alamdān-e Soflā; also known as 'Alamdān and Alamdār) is a village in Dezh Gah Rural District, Dehram District, Farashband County, Fars province, Iran. At the 2006 census, its population was 168, in 40 families.
