= Sar Borj, Bardaskan =

Sar Borj سربرج
- Village
- Location within Iran
- Coordinates: 35°23′36″N 57°56′39″E
- Country: Iran
- Province: Razavi Khorasan
- County: Bardaskan
- Bakhsh: Central
- Rural District: Kuhpayeh

Population (2006)
  - Total: 122
- Time zone: UTC+3:30 (IRST)
  - Summer (DST): UTC+4:30 (IRDT)

Sar Borj (Persian: سربرج) is a village in Kuhpayeh Rural District Rural District, in the Central District of Bardaskan County, Razavi Khorasan Province, Iran. At the 2006 census, its population was 122, in 44 families.
