= Nezamabad, Razavi Khorasan =

Nezamabad نظام اباد
- Village
- Location within Iran
- Coordinates: 35°21′29″N 57°58′17″E
- Country: Iran
- Province: Razavi Khorasan
- County: Bardaskan
- Bakhsh: Central
- Rural District: Kuhpayeh

Population (2006)
  - Total: 222
- Time zone: UTC+3:30 (IRST)
  - Summer (DST): UTC+4:30 (IRDT)

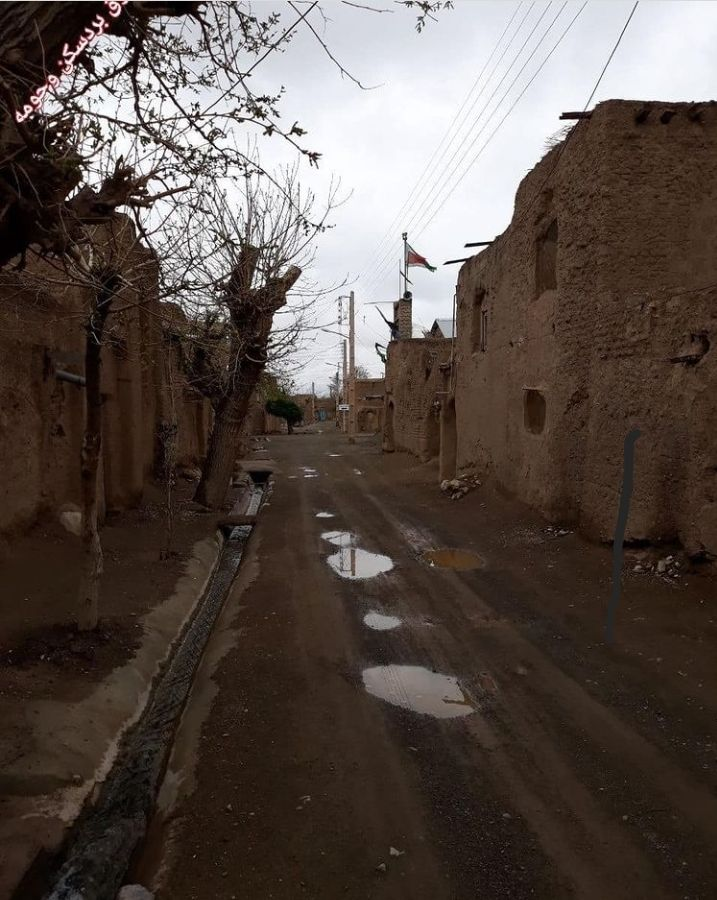
Nezamabad

Nezamabad (Persian: نظام اباد, also Romanized as Nez̧āmābād) is a village in Kuhpayeh Rural District Rural District, in the Central District of Bardaskan County, Razavi Khorasan Province, Iran. At the 2006 census, its population was 222, in 67 families.
