= Janiabad, Farashband =

Janiabad جاني اباد
- Village
- Location within Iran
- Coordinates: 28°59′51″N 52°06′33″E
- Country: Iran
- Province: Fars
- County: Farashband
- Bakhsh: Central
- Rural District: Nujin

Population (2006)
  - Total: 182
- Time zone: UTC+3:30 (IRST)
  - Summer (DST): UTC+4:30 (IRDT)

Janiabad (Persian: جاني اباد, also Romanized as Jānīābād) is a village in Nujin Rural District, in the Central District of Farashband County, Fars province, Iran. At the 2006 census, its population was 182, in 39 families.
