= Alamdan =

Alamdan (Persian: علمدان) may refer to:

- Alamdan-e Olya, Fars Province
- Alamdan-e Sofla, Fars Province
- Alamdan, Mazandaran
