= Zir Vaqt =

Zar Vaqt زَروقت
- Village
- Location within Iran
- Coordinates: 35°29′14″N 58°07′26″E
- Country: Iran
- Province: Razavi Khorasan
- County: Bardaskan
- Bakhsh: Central
- Rural District: Kuhpayeh

Population (2006)
  - Total: 159
- Time zone: UTC+3:30 (IRST)
  - Summer (DST): UTC+4:30 (IRDT)

Zar Vaqt (Persian: زَروقت, also Romanized as Zar Vaqt; also known as Zarvaqt) is a village in Kuhpayeh Rural District Rural District, in the Central District of Bardaskan County, Razavi Khorasan Province, Iran. At the 2006 census, its population was 159, in 53 families.
