= Khowr, Razavi Khorasan =

Village in Razavi Khorasan province, Iran

Khowr Persian: خور
- Village
- Location within Iran
- Coordinates: 35°27′46″N 58°03′25″E
- Country: Iran
- Province: Razavi Khorasan
- County: Bardaskan
- District: Central
- Rural District: Kuhpayeh

Population (2016)
  - Total: 489
- Time zone: UTC+3:30 (IRST)

Khowr (Persian: خور) (Note: Also romanized as Khūr and Khur; also known as Kharū) is a village in Kuhpayeh Rural District of the Central District in Bardaskan County, Razavi Khorasan province, Iran.

== Demographics ==
=== Population ===
At the time of the 2006 National Census, the village's population was 679 in 207 households. The following census in 2011 counted 493 people in 194 households. The 2016 census measured the population of the village as 489 people in 184 households.
