= Aliabad, Bardaskan =

Village in Razavi Khorasan province, Iran

Aliabad Persian: علي اباد
- Village
- Location within Iran
- Coordinates: 35°17′09″N 58°05′39″E
- Country: Iran
- Province: Razavi Khorasan
- County: Bardaskan
- District: Central
- Rural District: Kenarshahr

Population (2016)
  - Total: 152
- Time zone: UTC+3:30 (IRST)

Aliabad (Persian: علي اباد) (Note: Also romanized as ‘Alīābād; also known as ‘Alīābād-e Kashmar and Alīābād Kishmar) is a village in Kenarshahr Rural District of the Central District in Bardaskan County, Razavi Khorasan province, Iran.

== Demographics ==
=== Population ===
At the time of the 2006 National Census, the village's population was 140 in 45 households. The following census in 2011 counted 135 people in 45 households. The 2016 census measured the population of the village as 152 people in 52 households.
