= Ribat of Kabudan =

Iranian national heritage site

- رباط کبودان
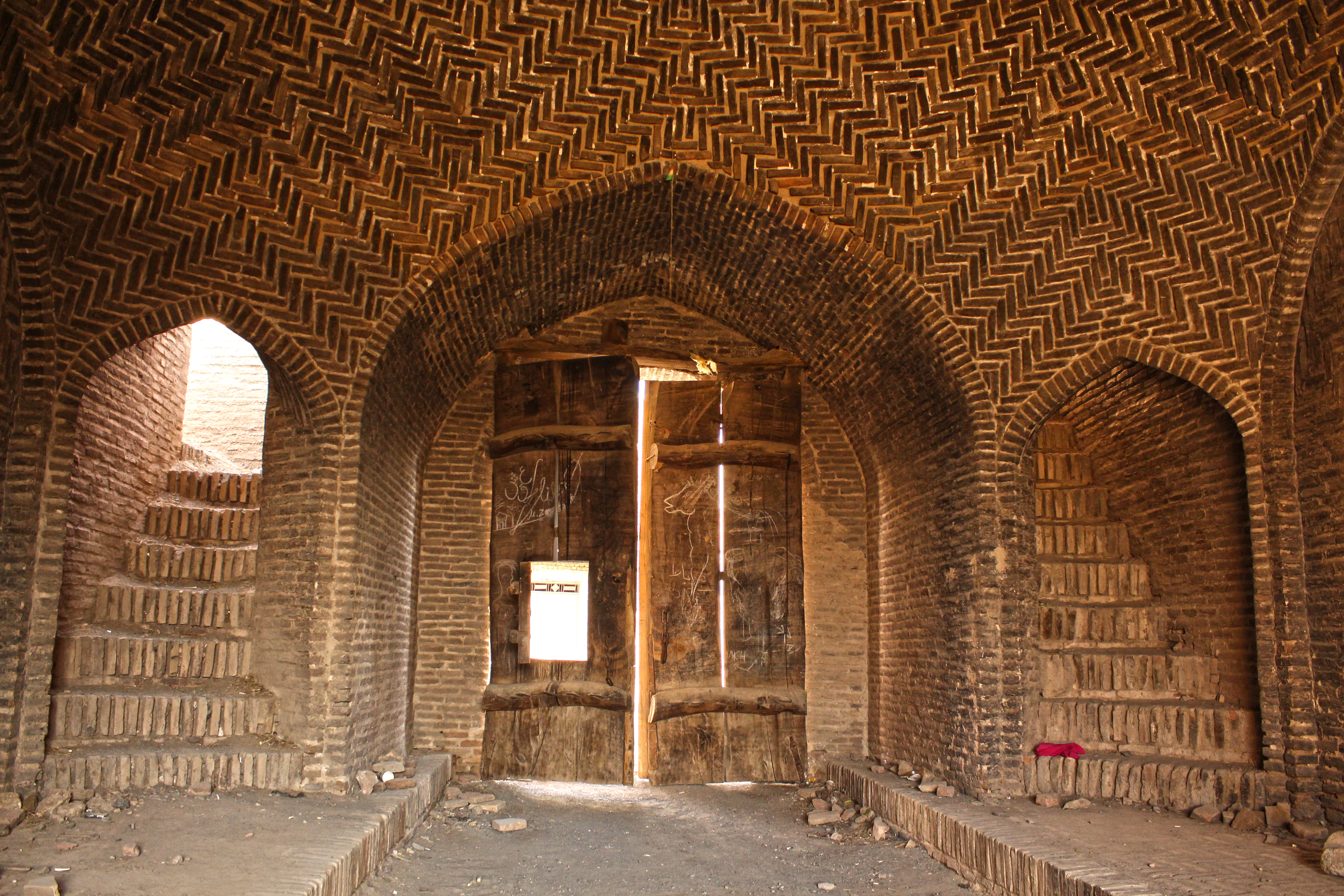
- Interactive map of the Ribat of Kabudan area

General information
- Type: Ribat
- Architectural style: Qajar architecture
- Location: Kabudan, Razavi Khorasan Province, Iran
- Construction started: Qajar dynasty

Ribat of Kabudan (Persian: رباط کبودان) is a historical Ribat related to the Qajar dynasty and is located in Kabudan, Razavi Khorasan Province.
