= Haji =

Haji may refer to:

- Amou Haji (1928 – 2022) Iranian hermit man
- Haji Wright (born 1998) American professional soccer player
