= Kalateh-ye Now, Bardaskan =

Village in Razavi Khorasan province, Iran

Kalateh-ye Now Persian: كلاته نو
- Village
- Location within Iran
- Coordinates: 35°11′44″N 57°57′35″E
- Country: Iran
- Province: Razavi Khorasan
- County: Bardaskan
- District: Central
- Rural District: Kenarshahr

Population (2016)
  - Total: 959
- Time zone: UTC+3:30 (IRST)

Kalateh-ye Now (Persian: كلاته نو) (Note: Also romanized as Kalāteh-ye Now) is a village in Kenarshahr Rural District of the Central District in Bardaskan County, Razavi Khorasan province, Iran.

== Demographics ==
=== Population ===
At the time of the 2006 National Census, the village's population was 821 in 236 households. The following census in 2011 counted 908 people in 284 households. The 2016 census measured the population of the village as 959 people in 308 households.
