= Sang-e Pir =

Village in Razavi Khorasan province, Iran

Sang-e Pir Persian: سنگ پير
- Village
- Location within Iran
- Coordinates: 35°30′51″N 58°09′03″E
- Country: Iran
- Province: Razavi Khorasan
- County: Bardaskan
- District: Central
- Rural District: Kuhpayeh

Population (2016)
  - Total: 225
- Time zone: UTC+3:30 (IRST)

Sang-e Pir (Persian: سنگ پير) (Note: Also romanized as Sang-e Pīr) is a village in Kuhpayeh Rural District of the Central District in Bardaskan County, Razavi Khorasan province, Iran.

== Demographics ==
=== Population ===
At the time of the 2006 National Census, the village's population was 247 in 67 households. The following census in 2011 counted 214 people in 69 households. The 2016 census measured the population of the village as 225 people in 68 households.
