= Bijvard =

Village in Razavi Khorasan province, Iran

Bijvard Persian: بيجورد
- Village
- Location within Iran
- Coordinates: 35°27′22″N 58°01′53″E
- Country: Iran
- Province: Razavi Khorasan
- County: Bardaskan
- District: Central
- Rural District: Kuhpayeh

Population (2016)
  - Total: 446
- Time zone: UTC+3:30 (IRST)

Bijvard (Persian: بيجورد) (Note: Also romanized as Bījvard; also known as Bījvar, Bijwar, Bīzhvard, and Borjak) is a village in Kuhpayeh Rural District of the Central District in Bardaskan County, Razavi Khorasan province, Iran.

== Demographics ==
=== Population ===
At the time of the 2006 National Census, the village's population was 455 in 144 households. The following census in 2011 counted 380 people in 142 households. The 2016 census measured the population of the village as 446 people in 174 households.
