= Kuraki =

Kuraki may refer to:

- Kuraki, Iran (disambiguation), places in Iran
- Mai Kuraki (b. 1982), Japanese singer
