= Shafiabad, Bardaskan =

Village in Razavi Khorasan province, Iran

Shafiabad Persian: شفيع اباد
- Village
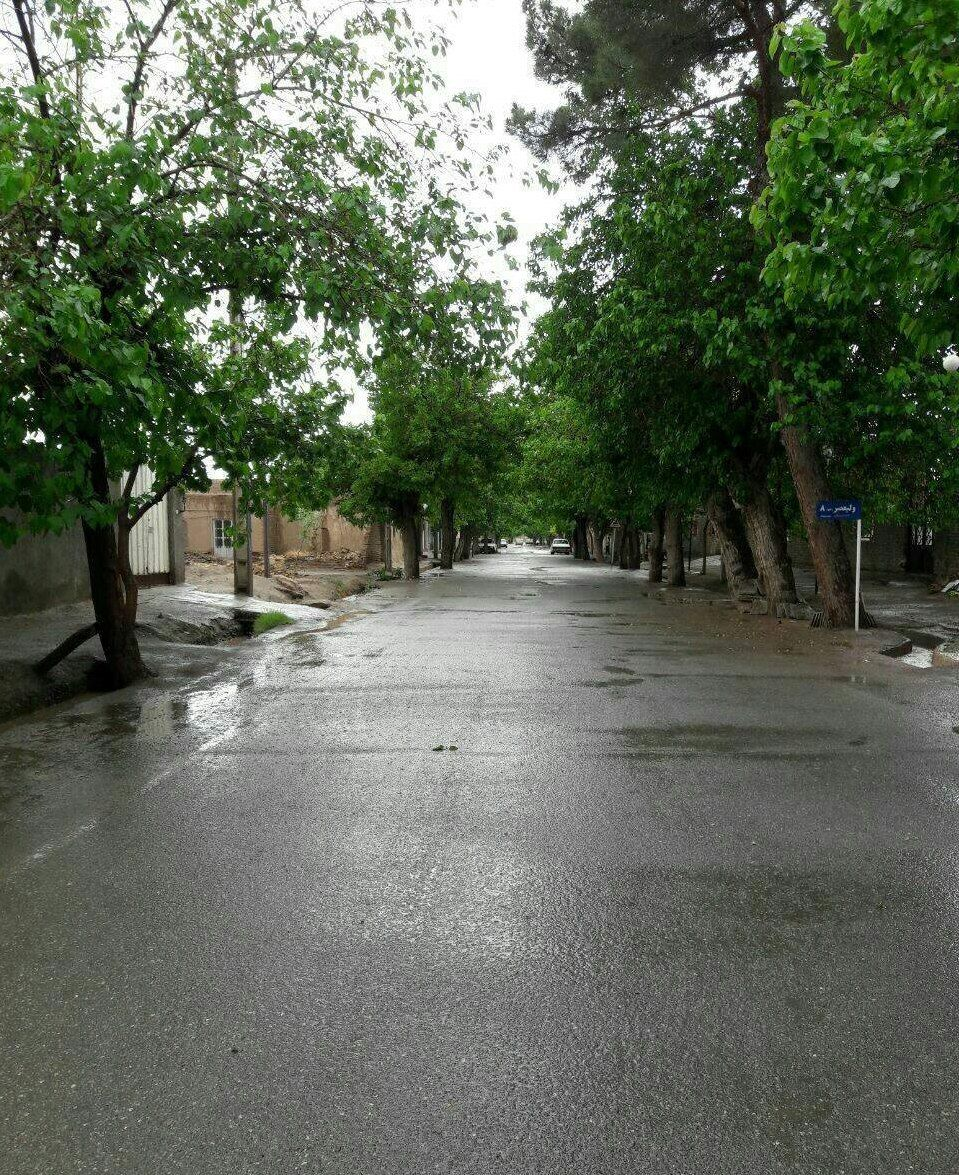
- The village of Shafiabad

- Location within Iran
- Coordinates: 35°14′52″N 58°03′02″E
- Country: Iran
- Province: Razavi Khorasan
- County: Bardaskan
- District: Central
- Rural District: Kenarshahr

Population (2016)
  - Total: 2,148
- Time zone: UTC+3:30 (IRST)

Shafiabad (Persian: شفيع اباد) (Note: Also romanized as Shafī‘ābād) is a village in, and the capital of, Kenarshahr Rural District in the Central District of Bardaskan County, Razavi Khorasan province, Iran. The previous capital of the rural district was the village of Shahrabad, now a city.

== Demographics ==
=== Population ===
At the time of the 2006 National Census, the village's population was 2,035 in 597 households. The following census in 2011 counted 2,185 people in 682 households. The 2016 census measured the population of the village as 2,148 people in 735 households. It was the most populous village in its rural district.
