= Jowhari =

Jowhari may refer to:

- Majid Jowhari (born 1960), a Canadian politician
- Jowhari, Farashband, a village in Iran
