= Kasf =

Village in Razavi Khorasan province, Iran

Kasf Persian: كاسف
- Village
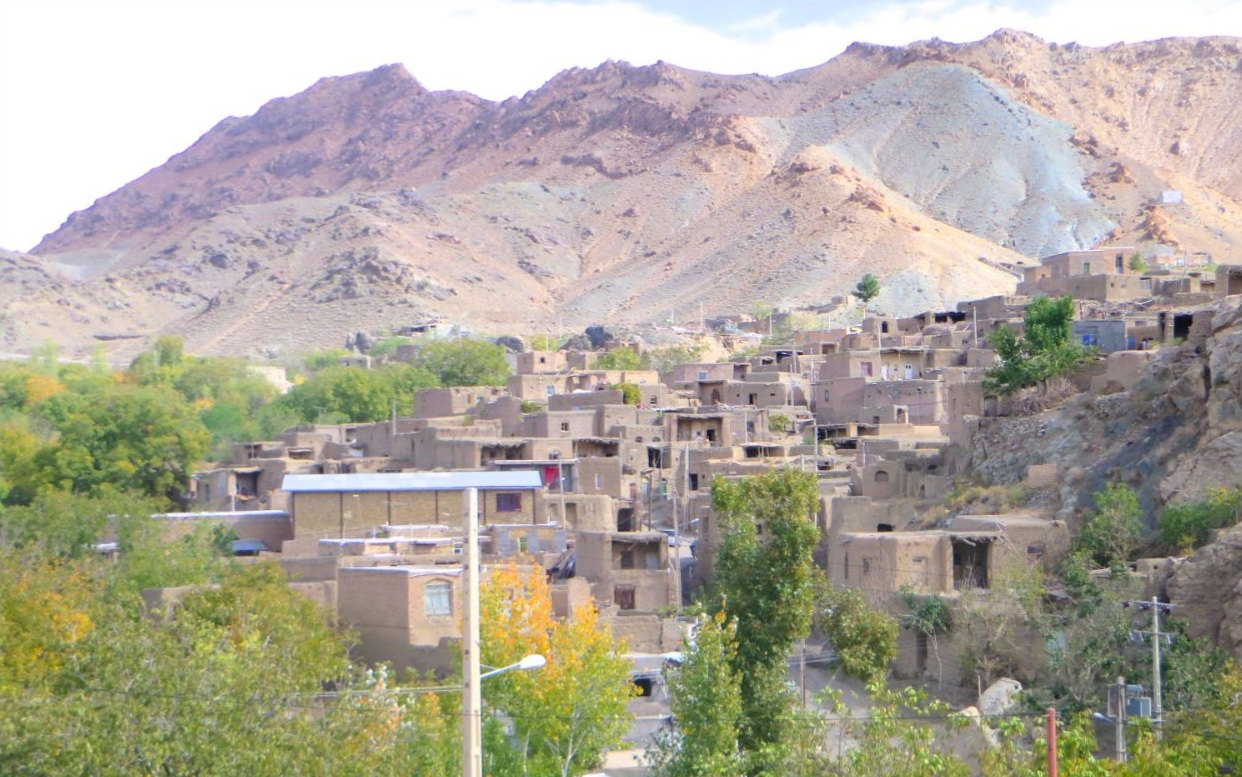
- The village of Kasf

- Location within Iran
- Coordinates: 35°25′17″N 57°53′37″E
- Country: Iran
- Province: Razavi Khorasan
- County: Bardaskan
- District: Central
- Rural District: Kuhpayeh

Population (2016)
  - Total: 536
- Time zone: UTC+3:30 (IRST)

Kasf (Persian: كاسف) (Note: Also romanized as Kāsf) is a village in Kuhpayeh Rural District of the Central District in Bardaskan County, Razavi Khorasan province, Iran.

== Demographics ==
=== Population ===
At the time of the 2006 National Census, the village's population was 962 in 231 households. The following census in 2011 counted 650 people in 209 households. The 2016 census measured the population of the village as 536 people in 190 households.
