= Khaneqah, Bardaskan =

Village in Razavi Khorasan province, Iran

Khaneqah Persian: خانقاه
- Village
- Location within Iran
- Coordinates: 35°24′27″N 58°05′01″E
- Country: Iran
- Province: Razavi Khorasan
- County: Bardaskan
- District: Central
- Rural District: Kuhpayeh

Population (2016)
  - Total: 206
- Time zone: UTC+3:30 (IRST)

Khaneqah (Persian: خانقاه) (Note: Also romanized as Khāneqāh and Khānqāh; also known as Khāneqā and Khāneqeh) is a village in Kuhpayeh Rural District of the Central District in Bardaskan County, Razavi Khorasan province, Iran.

== Demographics ==
=== Population ===
At the time of the 2006 National Census, the village's population was 259 in 78 households. The following census in 2011 counted 250 people in 85 households. The 2016 census measured the population of the village as 206 people in 78 households.
