= Hodk =

Village in Razavi Khorasan province, Iran

Hodk Persian: هدک
- Village
- Location within Iran
- Coordinates: 35°22′44″N 57°56′37″E
- Country: Iran
- Province: Razavi Khorasan
- County: Bardaskan
- District: Central
- Rural District: Kuhpayeh

Population (2016)
  - Total: 425
- Time zone: UTC+3:30 (IRST)

Hodk (Persian: هدک) is a village in Kuhpayeh Rural District of the Central District in Bardaskan County, Razavi Khorasan province, Iran.

== Demographics ==
=== Population ===
At the time of the 2006 National Census, the village's population was 499 in 174 households. The following census in 2011 counted 495 people in 182 households. The 2016 census measured the population of the village as 425 people in 173 households.
