= Bachan (disambiguation) =

"Bachan" is a former spelling of Bacan, the largest of the Bacan Islands in Indonesia.

Bachan may also refer to:

- Bachan (surname), an alternate spelling of "Bachchan", an Indian surname
- Bachan, a village in Iran
- Bachan (rhetorician) or Pachan, an Italo-Briton mentioned in the life of Saint Cadoc and sometimes thought to have been the inspiration for Saint Fagan
