= Amou =

Amou may refer to:

- Amou, Benin
- Amou, Landes, France
- Amou Prefecture, Togo
- Amou Haji, also known as the World's Dirtiest Man (1928-2022)

== See also ==
- Australian Maritime Officers Union
