= Seyfabad, Bardaskan =

Village in Razavi Khorasan province, Iran

Seyfabad Persian: سيف اباد
- Village
- Location within Iran
- Coordinates: 35°11′09″N 57°59′11″E
- Country: Iran
- Province: Razavi Khorasan
- County: Bardaskan
- District: Central
- Rural District: Kenarshahr

Population (2016)
  - Total: 985
- Time zone: UTC+3:30 (IRST)

Seyfabad (Persian: سيف اباد) (Note: Also romanized as Seyfābād) is a village in Kenarshahr Rural District of the Central District in Bardaskan County, Razavi Khorasan province, Iran.

== Demographics ==
=== Population ===
At the time of the 2006 National Census, the village's population was 884 in 230 households. The following census in 2011 counted 971 people in 301 households. The 2016 census measured the population of the village as 985 people in 314 households.
