= Aliabad-e Keshmar =

Village in Razavi Khorasan province, Iran

Aliabad-e Keshmar Persian: علی‌آباد کشمر
- Village
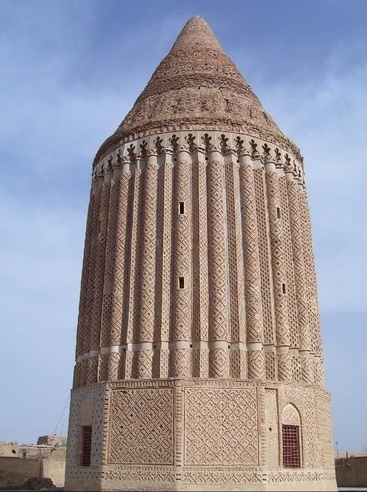
- Ali Abad Keshmar Tower

- Location within Iran
- Coordinates: 35°17′28″N 58°06′00″E
- Country: Iran
- Province: Razavi Khorasan
- County: Bardaskan
- District: Central
- Rural District: Kenarshahr
- Elevation: 1,029 m (3,376 ft)

Population (2016)
  - Total: 607
- Time zone: UTC+3:30 (IRST)

Aliabad-e Keshmar (Persian: علی‌آباد کشمر) (Note: Also romanized as ‘Alīābād-e Keshmar) is a village in Kenarshahr Rural District of the Central District in Bardaskan County, Razavi Khorasan province, Iran.

== Demographics ==
=== Population ===
At the time of the 2006 National Census, the village's population, listed as Keshmar, was 633 in 191 households. The following census in 2011 counted 609 people in 203 households. The 2016 census measured the population of the village as 607 people in 210 households.
