= Kenarshahr Rural District =

Rural district in Razavi Khorasan province, Iran

Kenarshahr Rural District Persian: دهستان كنارشهر
- Rural District
- Location within Iran
- Coordinates: 35°18′N 58°05′E
- Country: Iran
- Province: Razavi Khorasan
- County: Bardaskan
- District: Central
- Established: 1987
- Capital: Shafiabad

Population (2016)
  - Total: 5,504
- Time zone: UTC+3:30 (IRST)

Kenarshahr Rural District (Persian: دهستان كنارشهر) is in the Central District of Bardaskan County, Razavi Khorasan province, Iran. Its capital is the village of Shafiabad. The previous capital of the rural district was the village of Shahrabad, now a city.

== Demographics ==
=== Population ===
At the time of the 2006 National Census, the rural district's population was 5,065 in 1,477 households. There were 5,513 inhabitants in 1,717 households at the following census of 2011. The 2016 census measured the population of the rural district as 5,504 in 1,832 households. The most populous of its 20 villages was Shafiabad, with 2,148 people.

=== Other villages in the rural district ===
- Abnow
- Aliabad
- Aliabad-e Keshmar
- Kalateh-ye Now
- Seyfabad
- Sherkat-e Madaras
