= Sir, Razavi Khorasan =

Village in Razavi Khorasan province, Iran

Sir Persian: سير
- Village
- Location within Iran
- Coordinates: 35°23′29″N 58°04′22″E
- Country: Iran
- Province: Razavi Khorasan
- County: Bardaskan
- District: Central
- Rural District: Kuhpayeh

Population (2016)
  - Total: 540
- Time zone: UTC+3:30 (IRST)

Sir (Persian: سير) (Note: Also romanized as Sīr) is a village in Kuhpayeh Rural District of the Central District in Bardaskan County, Razavi Khorasan province, Iran.

== Demographics ==
=== Population ===
At the time of the 2006 National Census, the village's population was 441 in 201 households. The following census in 2011 counted 275 people in 144 households. The 2016 census measured the population of the village as 540 people in 259 households.
