= Abnow, Bardaskan =

Village in Razavi Khorasan province, Iran

Abnow Persian: ابنو
- Village
- Location within Iran
- Coordinates: 35°17′20″N 58°05′53″E
- Country: Iran
- Province: Razavi Khorasan
- County: Bardaskan
- District: Central
- Rural District: Kenarshahr

Population (2016)
  - Total: 536
- Time zone: UTC+3:30 (IRST)

Abnow (Persian: ابنو) (Note: Also romanized as Ābnow) is a village in Kenarshahr Rural District of the Central District in Bardaskan County, Razavi Khorasan province, Iran.

== Demographics ==
=== Population ===
At the time of the 2006 National Census, the village's population was 498 in 159 households. The following census in 2011 counted 486 people in 148 households. The 2016 census measured the population of the village as 536 people in 173 households.
