= Farashband =

City in Fars province, Iran

Farashband Persian: فراشبند
- City
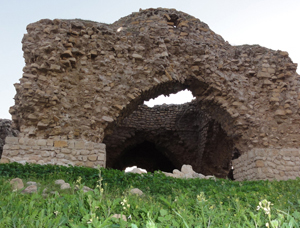
- The old fire temple

- Location within Iran
- Coordinates: 28°51′42″N 52°05′37″E
- Country: Iran
- Province: Fars
- County: Farashband
- District: Central
- Elevation: 775 m (2,543 ft)

Population (2016)
  - Total: 20,320
- Time zone: UTC+3:30 (IRST)

Farashband (Persian: فراشبند) (Note: Also romanized as Farrāshband; also known as Farāsh and Farrāsh) is a city in the Central District of Farashband County, Fars province, Iran, serving as capital of both the county and the district. The city is at an altitude of 775 metres (2,543 ft).

== Demographics ==
=== Population ===
At the time of the 2006 national census, the city's population was 17,142 in 3,762 households. The following census in 2011 counted 18,492 people in 4,700 households. The 2016 census measured the population of the city as 20,320 people in 5,717 households.

== Overview ==
Farashband is one of the Fars province cities which is located 166 km south-west of Shiraz. It neighbours from the north with Kazeroon, from the west with Bushehr (dashti county), from the south with Khonj and Mohr and the east with Qir and Firuzabad. Its height above sea level is 750 metres (2,460 ft) and its area is approximately about 59,455 hectares (146,920 acres). The climate is hot and dry, with annual average temperature of 25 °C.

Citrus orchards, especially palm and Ghasb zahedi call into existence some tourism prospects for this region. In addition, the region's nomads have created a beautiful space and the emergence of the hand-woven like Gabbeh, Glim and Jajim. Language is mostly Tajik persian, Also the Qashqai language is spoken here, too. Several tribes live in Farashband such as Tork and Pars.

Nearly 25,000 nomadics inhabit for 7–8 months in pastures every year. Qashqais include some tribes such as Amale, Shesh bluki, Farsimadan, and Ardkapan. Furthermore the rest of the population are of the Tajik tribe(most of the city). The city has natural gas resources and its economy is based on agriculture, gardening (palm), and carpet weaving.

Farashband has a history of 1600 years. Monuments left indicate this fact in this city. Despite the great antiquity, due to lack of resources and historical documents, it is considered younger than other cities. People have always believed that the city was created during the reign of Bahram Gur (Sasanian Empire). Monuments with the chahartaq architecture show this fact.

There are several archaeological sites such as:

- Chahar Tagh gangi (four-arched) related to Sassani period
- Farrashband's bath
- Chahar Tagh naghare khaneh
- ChaharTagh Rahni5-ChaharTagh Gonbad
- wind mill
- goldsmiths Ghallat related to Afsharian period

Most tourism prospects and religious area is consist of Konarmalek four-arched, tol gangi four arched, Zayerhosseini four-arched, Khormayak, Gonbad, Ghanatbagh, Rahni four-arched, Barmefarhad spring, Abpa spring, mountain park, emamzade holy shrine (Agham shahid) shahzade tayyeb holy shrine (zeinalabedin), Shahaziz holy shrine (to Baghi), Seyyed Ahmad holy shrine, Seyyed Mohammad holy shrine, Alibakhsi, Pirgheib, Mohamnad (khaniak), Agha Mohammad (khorab), Amir Shahsavar (dezhgah) and Abbolghasem (Dehram) holy shrines.
