= Nujin =

City in Fars province, Iran

Nujin Persian: نوجین
- City
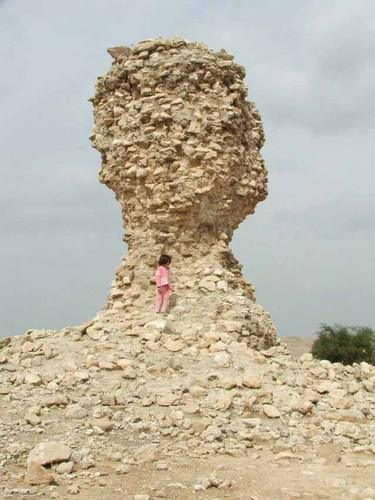

- Location within Iran
- Coordinates: 29°07′21″N 52°00′48″E
- Country: Iran
- Province: Fars
- County: Farashband
- District: Central

Population (2016)
  - Total: 3,769
- Time zone: UTC+3:30 (IRST)

Nujin (Persian: نوجین) (Note: Also romanized as Nowjin) is a city in the Central District of Farashband County, Fars province, Iran, serving as the administrative center for Nujin Rural District.

== Demographics ==
=== Population ===
At the time of the 2006 National Census, Nujin's population was 3,356 in 772 households, when it was a village in Nujin Rural District. The following census in 2011 counted 3,416 people in 925 households, by which time the village had been elevated to the status of a city. The 2016 census measured the population of the city as 3,769 people in 1,127 households.

== Gallery ==
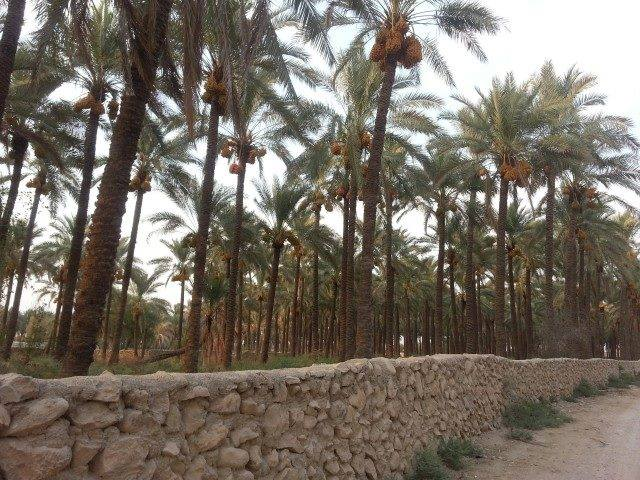

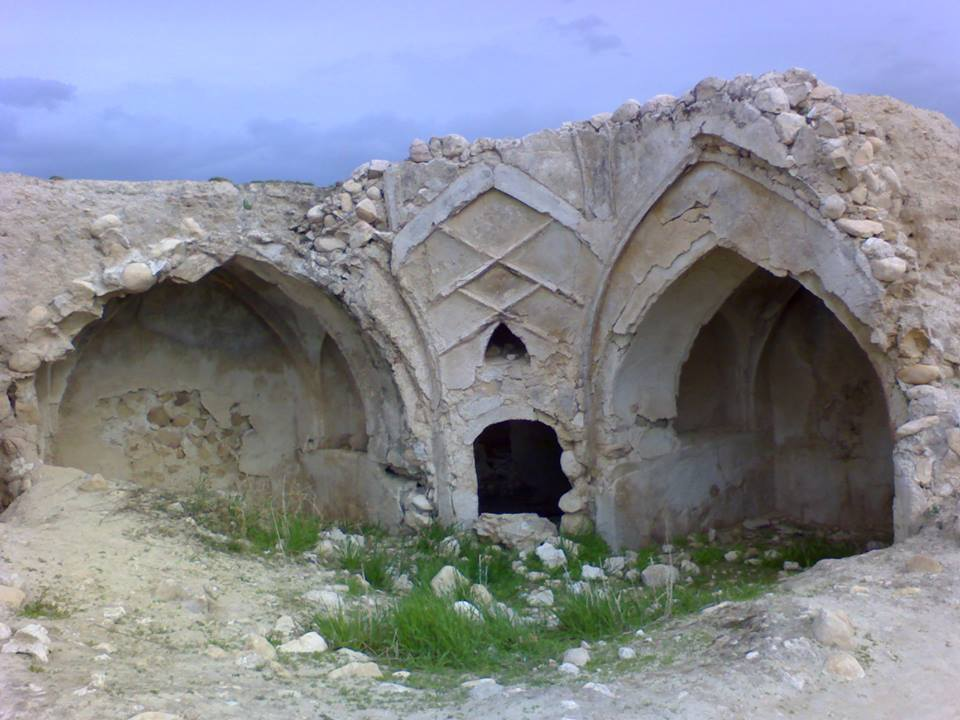

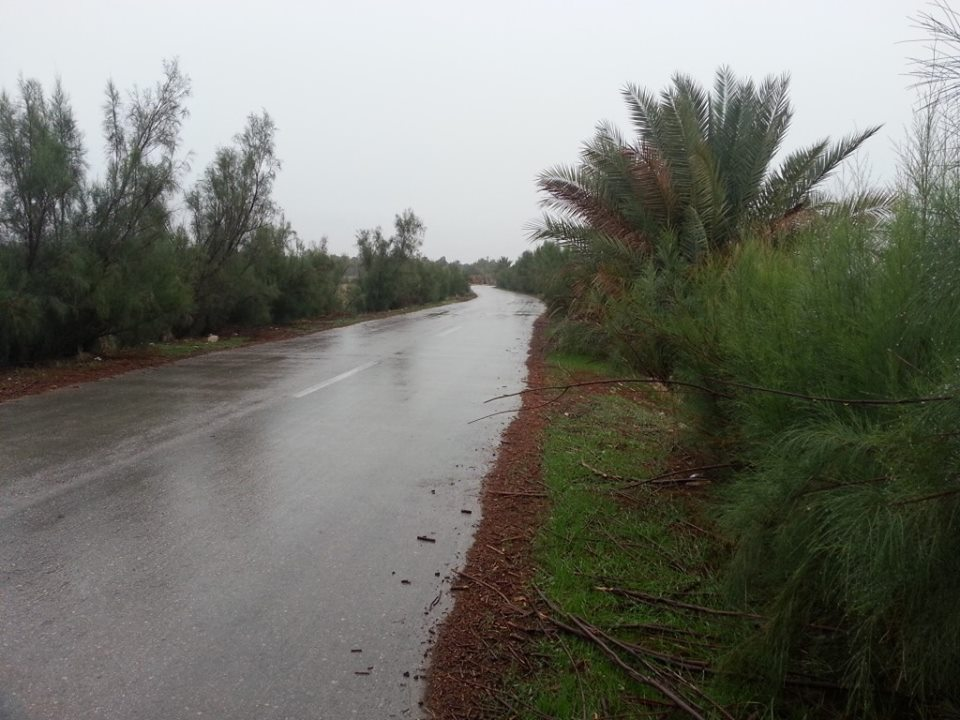
