= Bachchan =

The Bachchan is an Indian surname which may refer to:

- Bachchan family, an Indian showbiz family, founded by Harivansh Rai Bachchan
  - Abhishek Bachchan, Indian actor, son of Amitabh Bachchan
  - Aishwarya Rai Bachchan, Indian actress and 1994 Miss World, married to Abhishek
  - Amitabh Bachchan, Indian film actor
  - Harivansh Rai "Bachchan", Hindi poet and author; father of Amitabh
  - Jaya Bachchan, Indian actress, wife of Amitabh and mother of Abhishek
  - Teji Bachchan, social activist, wife of Harivansh, mother of Amitabh
- Bala Bachchan, Indian politician, member of the Indian National Congress

== See also ==
- Bachan (disambiguation)
- Bachchan (2013 film), a 2013 Indian Kannada-language film
- Bachchan (2014 film), a 2014 Indian Bengali-language film
- Bachchhan Paandey, a 2022 Indian Hindi-language film by Farhad Samji
- Bol Bachchan, a 2012 Indian comedy film by Rohit Shetty
