= Dehram =

City in Fars province, Iran

Dehram Persian: دهرم
- City
- Location within Iran
- Coordinates: 28°29′27″N 52°18′12″E
- Country: Iran
- Province: Fars
- County: Farashband
- District: Dehram

Population (2016)
  - Total: 3,468
- Time zone: UTC+3:30 (IRST)

Dehram (Persian: دهرم) is a city in, and the capital of, Dehram District of Farashband County, Fars province, Iran. It also serves as the administrative center for Dehram Rural District.

== Demographics ==
=== Population ===
At the time of the 2006 National Census, Dehram's population was 2,946 in 684 households, when it was a village in Dehram Rural District. The following census in 2011 counted 2,999 people in 760 households, by which time the village had been elevated to the status of a city. The 2016 census measured the population of the city as 3,468 people in 1,045 households.
