= Kowraki, Shiraz =

Kowraki كوركی
- Village
- Location within Iran
- Coordinates: 29°37′41″N 52°58′30″E
- Country: Iran
- Province: Fars
- County: Shiraz
- Bakhsh: Zarqan
- Rural District: Rahmatabad

Population (2006)
  - Total: 571
- Time zone: UTC+3:30 (IRST)
  - Summer (DST): UTC+4:30 (IRDT)

Kowraki (Persian: كوركی, also Romanized as Kowrakī and Koorki) is a village in Rahmatabad Rural District, Zarqan District, Shiraz County, Fars province, Iran. At the 2006 census, its population was 571, in 152 families.
