= Amou Haji =

Iranian eccentric (1928–2022)

- Haji smoking, pre-2014
- Born: 20 August 1928; Fars province, Persia
- Died: 23 October 2022 (aged 94); Dezh Gah Rural District, Fars province, Iran
- Known for: Uncleanliness

Amou Haji (20 August 1928 – 23 October 2022), also known as the "World's Dirtiest Man", was an Iranian hermit man who was known for not bathing for more than 60 years.

== Biography ==
Amou was not his real name but an affectionate nickname, generally given to elderly people, roughly translating as "old timer". He lived in the village of Dezh Gah in Fars province. He did not bathe for over 60 years, from c. 1957–62 until shortly before his death in 2022, because he feared that soap and water might cause disease. He claimed that he became a hermit due to "emotional setbacks" after experiencing heartbreak.

Amou Haji was celibate, ate carrion that he found (especially rotting porcupines), drank water from puddles and rusty oil cans, smoked animal dung using an old pipe, wore a war helmet to fend off cold, and lived in a hole that he had dug himself, or occasionally in a cinder block house constructed for him by local people. To manage his hair, he burned off the excesses with a flame. His skin was covered with soot because he "bathed" in smoke to cleanse himself.

He was photographed smoking multiple cigarettes simultaneously and refused water, food, and other basic necessities offered to him. He said that these attempts to care for him made him sad. Once, some young men forcefully attempted to give him a shower, but he managed to escape.

Author Claudia Hammond described Haji as having a "face and beard caked in mustard-brown earth", claiming that he "blends in" to the "barren landscape of southern Iran" and that, when he sits still, he "resembles a rock".

His story was covered in a 2013 documentary titled The Strange Life of Amou Haji.

== Death ==
Despite his unhygienic lifestyle, he lived to the age of 94. He died a few months after bathing for the first time in over 60 years, having been persuaded by the inhabitants of the village to do so.

== See also ==
- Dirty Dick – a London merchant who refused to wash after his fiancée died on their wedding day.
