= Korki =

Korki or Kurki or Kuraki (Persian: كركي) may refer to the following places in Iran:

- Korki, North Khorasan
- Korki, Sistan and Baluchestan, a place in Sistan and Baluchestan Province
