= Kabudan, Razavi Khorasan =

Village in Razavi Khorasan province, Iran

Kabudan Persian: كبودان
- Village
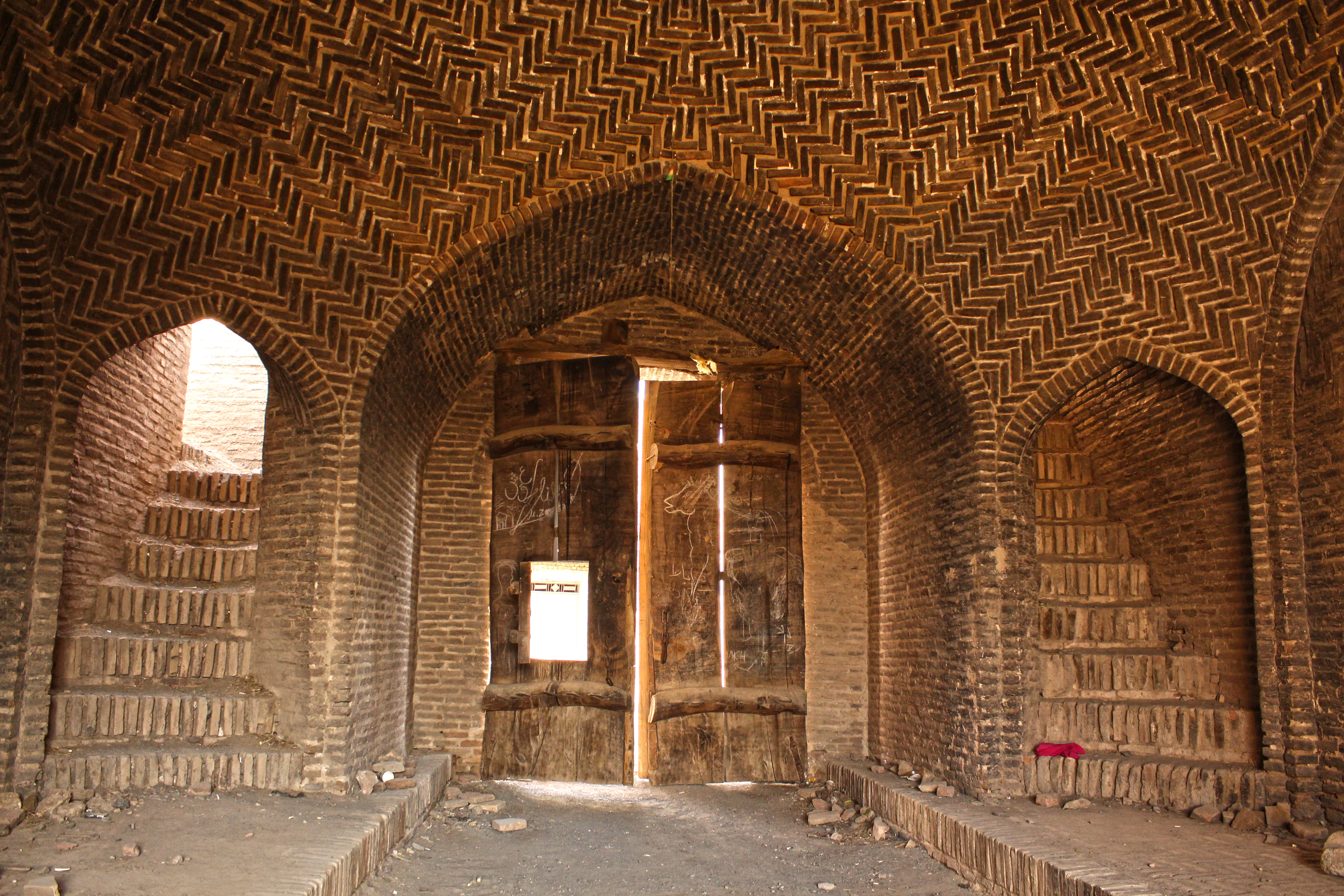
- Ribat-e Kabudan

- Location within Iran
- Coordinates: 35°22′36″N 57°58′38″E
- Country: Iran
- Province: Razavi Khorasan
- County: Bardaskan
- District: Central
- Rural District: Kuhpayeh

Population (2016)
  - Total: 749
- Time zone: UTC+3:30 (IRST)

Kabudan (Persian: كبودان) (Note: Also romanized as Kabūdān) is a village in, and the capital of, Kuhpayeh Rural District in the Central District of Bardaskan County, Razavi Khorasan province, Iran.

== Demographics ==
=== Population ===
At the time of the 2006 National Census, the village's population was 841 in 292 households. The following census in 2011 counted 861 people in 293 households. The 2016 census measured the population of the village as 749 people in 269 households, the most populous in its rural district.
