= Janiabad, Rostam =

Janiabad جاني اباد
- Village
- Location within Iran
- Coordinates: 30°20′28″N 51°21′12″E
- Country: Iran
- Province: Fars
- County: Rostam
- Bakhsh: Central
- Rural District: Rostam-e Do

Population (2006)
  - Total: 353
- Time zone: UTC+3:30 (IRST)
  - Summer (DST): UTC+4:30 (IRDT)

Janiabad (Persian: جاني اباد, also Romanized as Jānīābād) is a village in Rostam-e Do Rural District, in the Central District of Rostam County, Fars province, Iran. At the 2006 census, its population was 353, in 83 families.
