= Deh Gah-e Jalaleh =

Deh Gah-e Jalaleh دهگاه جلاله
- Village
- Location within Iran
- Coordinates: 31°14′42″N 50°55′44″E
- Country: Iran
- Province: Kohgiluyeh and Boyer-Ahmad
- County: Dana
- Bakhsh: Pataveh
- Rural District: Sadat Mahmudi

Population (2006)
  - Total: 421
- Time zone: UTC+3:30 (IRST)
  - Summer (DST): UTC+4:30 (IRDT)

Deh Gah-e Jalaleh (Persian: دهگاه جلاله, also Romanized as Deh Gāh-e Jalāleh; also known as Deh Gāh) is a village in Sadat Mahmudi Rural District, Pataveh District, Dana County, Kohgiluyeh and Boyer-Ahmad Province, Iran. At the 2006 census, its population was 421, in 65 families.
