= Dehgah-e Gaheshlun =

Dehgah-e Gaheshlun دهگه گاهشلون
- Village
- Country: Iran
- Province: Khuzestan
- County: Dezful
- Bakhsh: Sardasht
- Rural District: Seyyedvaliyeddin

Population (2006)
  - Total: 30
- Time zone: UTC+3:30 (IRST)
  - Summer (DST): UTC+4:30 (IRDT)

Dehgah-e Gaheshlun (Persian: دهگه گاهشلون, also Romanized as Dehgah-e Gāheshlūn) is a village in Seyyedvaliyeddin Rural District, Sardasht District, Dezful County, Khuzestan Province, Iran. At the 2006 census, its population was 30, in 4 families.
