= Dehgah-e Kandehi =

Village in Fars, Iran

Dehgah-e Kandehi دهگاه كنده اي
- Village
- Location within Iran
- Coordinates: 29°44′23″N 51°47′18″E
- Country: Iran
- Province: Fars
- County: Kazerun
- Bakhsh: Kuhmareh
- Rural District: Kuhmareh

Population (2006)
  - Total: 25
- Time zone: UTC+3:30 (IRST)
  - Summer (DST): UTC+4:30 (IRDT)

Dehgah-e Kandehi (Persian: دهگاه كنده اي, also Romanized as Dehgāh-e Kandeh’ī; also known as Dehgāh) is a village in Kuhmareh Rural District, Kuhmareh District, Kazerun County, Fars province, Iran. At the 2006 census, its population was 25, in 4 families.
