= Dehgah-e Lalmir =

Coordinates: 31.9867°N 49.6029°E

Dehgah-e Lalmir دهگه لالمير
- Village
- Interactive map of Dehgah-e Lalmir
- Country: Iran
- Province: Khuzestan
- County: Izeh
- Bakhsh: Central
- Rural District: Margha

Population (2006)
  - Total: 93
- Time zone: UTC+3:30 (IRST)
  - Summer (DST): UTC+4:30 (IRDT)

Dehgah-e Lalmir (Persian: دهگه لالمير, also Romanized as Dehgah-e Lālmīr) is a village in Margha Rural District, in the Central District of Izeh County, Khuzestan Province, Iran. At the 2006 census, its population was 93, in 17 families.
