= Gud-e Lasiah =

Gud-e Lasiah گودلاسياه
- Village
- Location within Iran
- Coordinates: 30°28′07″N 56°35′22″E
- Country: Iran
- Province: Kerman
- County: Kerman
- Bakhsh: Chatrud
- Rural District: Kavirat

Population (2006)
  - Total: 16
- Time zone: UTC+3:30 (IRST)
  - Summer (DST): UTC+4:30 (IRDT)

Gud-e Lasiah (Persian: گودلاسياه, also Romanized as Gūd-e Lāsīāh; also known as Jānīābād) is a village in Kavirat Rural District, Chatrud District, Kerman County, Kerman Province, Iran. At the 2006 census, its population was 16, in 4 families.
