= Deh Gah, Andika =

Deh Gah دهگاه
- Village
- Location within Iran
- Coordinates: 32°12′58″N 49°26′28″E
- Country: Iran
- Province: Khuzestan
- County: Andika
- Bakhsh: Central
- Rural District: Qaleh-ye Khvajeh

Population (2006)
  - Total: 39
- Time zone: UTC+3:30 (IRST)
  - Summer (DST): UTC+4:30 (IRDT)

Deh Gah (Persian: دهگاه, also Romanized as Deh Gāh and Dehgāh) is a village in Qaleh-ye Khvajeh Rural District, in the Central District of Andika County, Khuzestan Province, Iran. At the 2006 census, its population was 39, in 6 families.
