= Deh Gah, Rostam =

Deh Gah ده گاه
- Village
- Location within Iran
- Coordinates: 30°30′23″N 51°19′21″E
- Country: Iran
- Province: Fars
- County: Rostam
- Bakhsh: Sorna
- Rural District: Poshtkuh-e Rostam

Population (2006)
  - Total: 37
- Time zone: UTC+3:30 (IRST)
  - Summer (DST): UTC+4:30 (IRDT)

Deh Gah (Persian: ده گاه, also Romanized as Deh Gāh) is a village in Poshtkuh-e Rostam Rural District, Sorna District, Rostam County, Fars province, Iran. At the 2006 census, its population was 37, in 8 families.
