= Deh Gah, Chaharmahal and Bakhtiari =

Deh Gah ده گاه
- Village
- Location within Iran
- Coordinates: 31°14′42″N 50°55′44″E
- Country: Iran
- Province: Chaharmahal and Bakhtiari
- County: Lordegan
- Bakhsh: Central
- Rural District: Sardasht

Population (2006)
  - Total: 147
- Time zone: UTC+3:30 (IRST)
  - Summer (DST): UTC+4:30 (IRDT)

Deh Gah (Persian: ده گاه, also Romanized as Deh Gāh) is a village in Sardasht Rural District, in the Central District of Lordegan County, Chaharmahal and Bakhtiari Province, Iran. At the 2006 census, its population was 147, in 26 families. The village is populated by Lurs.
