= Dehram Rural District =

Rural district in Fars province, Iran

Dehram Rural District Persian: دهستان دهرم
- Rural District
- Location within Iran
- Coordinates: 28°31′45″N 52°16′12″E
- Country: Iran
- Province: Fars
- County: Farashband
- District: Dehram
- Capital: Dehram

Population (2016)
  - Total: 1,478
- Time zone: UTC+3:30 (IRST)

Dehram Rural District (Persian: دهستان دهرم) is in Dehram District of Farashband County, Fars province, Iran. It is administered from the city of Dehram.

== Demographics ==
=== Population ===
At the time of the 2006 National Census, the rural district's population was 4,630 in 1,078 households. There were 1,463 inhabitants in 375 households at the following census of 2011. The 2016 census measured the population of the rural district as 1,478 in 395 households. The most populous of its 36 villages was Ahmadabad, with 674 people.
