= Kuhpayeh Rural District (Bardaskan County) =

Rural district in Razavi Khorasan province, Iran

Kuhpayeh Rural District Persian: دهستان كوهپايه
- Rural District
- Location within Iran
- Coordinates: 35°27′N 57°58′E
- Country: Iran
- Province: Razavi Khorasan
- County: Bardaskan
- District: Central
- Established: 1987
- Capital: Kabudan

Population (2016)
  - Total: 4,868
- Time zone: UTC+3:30 (IRST)

Kuhpayeh Rural District (Persian: دهستان كوهپايه) is in the Central District of Bardaskan County, Razavi Khorasan province, Iran. Its capital is the village of Kabudan.

== Demographics ==
=== Population ===
At the time of the 2006 National Census, the rural district's population was 5,829 in 1,876 households. There were 4,883 inhabitants in 1,757 households at the following census of 2011. The 2016 census measured the population of the rural district as 4,868 in 1,871 households. The most populous of its 129 villages was Kabudan, with 749 people.

=== Other villages in the rural district ===
- Bijvard
- Hodk
- Kasf
- Khaneqah
- Khowr
- Sang-e Pir
- Shamsabad
- Sir
