= Dezh Gah Rural District =

Rural district in Fars province, Iran

Dezh Gah Rural District Persian: دهستان دژگاه
- Rural District
- Nickname: i9lll
- Location within Iran
- Coordinates: 28°12′45″N 52°51′13″E
- Country: Iran
- Province: Fars
- County: Farashband
- District: Dehram
- Capital: Dowlatabad

Population (2016)
  - Total: 4,001
- Time zone: UTC+3:30 (IRST)

Dezh Gah Rural District (Persian: دهستان دژگاه) is in Dehram District of Farashband County, Fars province, Iran. Its capital is the village of Dowlatabad.

== Demographics ==
=== Population ===
At the time of the 2006 National Census, the rural district's population was 3,232 in 657 households. There were 3,246 inhabitants in 754 households at the following census of 2011. The 2016 census measured the population of the rural district as 4,001 in 1,101 households. The most populous of its 17 villages was Dowlatabad, with 951 people.
