= Nujin Rural District =

Rural district in Fars province, Iran

Nujin Rural District Persian: دهستان نوجين
- Rural District
- Location within Iran
- Coordinates: 28°56′40″N 52°09′12″E
- Country: Iran
- Province: Fars
- County: Farashband
- District: Central
- Capital: Nujin

Population (2016)
  - Total: 2,973
- Time zone: UTC+3:30 (IRST)

Nujin Rural District (Persian: دهستان نوجين) is in the Central District of Farashband County, Fars province, Iran. It is administered from the city of Nujin.

== Demographics ==
=== Population ===
At the time of the 2006 National Census, the rural district's population was 6,839 in 1,526 households. There were 3,291 inhabitants in 801 households at the following census of 2011. The 2016 census measured the population of the rural district as 2,973 in 826 households. The most populous of its 34 villages was Mansurabad, with 929 people.
