= Dehram District =

District in Fars province, Iran

Dehram District Persian: بخش دهرم
- District
- Location within Iran
- Coordinates: 28°23′18″N 52°16′13″E
- Country: Iran
- Province: Fars
- County: Farashband
- Capital: Dehram

Population (2016)
  - Total: 8,947
- Time zone: UTC+3:30 (IRST)

Dehram District (Persian: بخش دهرم) is in Farashband County, Fars province, Iran. Its capital is the city of Dehram.

== History ==
After the 2006 National Census, the village of Dehram was elevated to the status of a city.

== Demographics ==
=== Population ===
At the time of the 2006 census, the district's population was 7,862 in 1,735 households. The following census in 2011 counted 7,708 people in 1,889 households. The 2016 census measured the population of the district as 8,947 inhabitants in 2,541 households.

=== Administrative divisions ===
Dehram District Population
Administrative Divisions	2006	2011	2016
Dehram RD	4,630	1,463	1,478
Dezh Gah RD	3,232	3,246	4,001
Dehram (city)		2,999	3,468
Total	7,862	7,708	8,947
RD = Rural District
