= Aviz Rural District =

Rural district in Fars province, Iran

Aviz Rural District Persian: دهستان آويز
- Rural District
- Location within Iran
- Coordinates: 28°53′40″N 52°02′51″E
- Country: Iran
- Province: Fars
- County: Farashband
- District: Central
- Capital: Aviz

Population (2016)
  - Total: 8,514
- Time zone: UTC+3:30 (IRST)

Aviz Rural District (Persian: دهستان آويز) is in the Central District of Farashband County, Fars province, Iran. Its capital is the village of Aviz.

== Demographics ==
=== Population ===
At the time of the 2006 National Census, the rural district's population was 6,836 in 1,451 households. There were 7,366 inhabitants in 1,833 households at the following census of 2011. The 2016 census measured the population of the rural district as 8,514 in 2,136 households. The most populous of its 54 villages was Aviz, with 1,389 people.
