= Central District (Bardaskan County) =

District in Razavi Khorasan province, Iran

Central District (Bardaskan County) Persian: بخش مرکزی شهرستان بردسکن
- District
- Location within Iran
- Coordinates: 35°23′N 57°59′E
- Country: Iran
- Province: Razavi Khorasan
- County: Bardaskan
- Established: 1995
- Capital: Bardaskan

Population (2016)
  - Total: 38,605
- Time zone: UTC+3:30 (IRST)

The Central District of Bardaskan County (Persian: بخش مرکزی شهرستان بردسکن) is in Razavi Khorasan province, Iran. Its capital is the city of Bardaskan.

== Demographics ==
=== Population ===
At the time of the 2006 National Census, the district's population was 33,105 in 9,313 households. The following census in 2011 counted 36,503 people in 10,768 households. The 2016 census measured the population of the district as 38,605 inhabitants in 12,273 households.

=== Administrative divisions ===
Central District (Bardaskan County) Population
Administrative Divisions	2006	2011	2016
Kenarshahr RD	5,065	5,513	5,504
Kuhpayeh RD	5,829	4,883	4,868
Bardaskan (city)	22,211	26,107	28,233
Total	33,105	36,503	38,605
RD = Rural District
