= Central District (Farashband County) =

District in Fars province, Iran

Central District (Farashband County) Persian: بخش مرکزی شهرستان فراشبند
- District
- Location within Iran
- Coordinates: 28°54′17″N 52°06′04″E
- Country: Iran
- Province: Fars
- County: Farashband
- Capital: Farashband

Population (2016)
  - Total: 35,576
- Time zone: UTC+3:30 (IRST)

The Central District of Farashband County (Persian: بخش مرکزی شهرستان فراشبند) is in Fars province, Iran. Its capital is the city of Farashband.

== History ==
After the 2006 National Census, the village of Nujin was elevated to the status of a city.

== Demographics ==
=== Population ===
At the time of the 2006 census, the district's population was 30,817 in 6,739 households. The following census in 2011 counted 32,565 people in 8,259 households. The 2016 census measured the population of the district as 35,576 inhabitants in 9,806 households.

=== Administrative divisions ===
Central District (Farashband County) Population
Administrative Divisions	2006	2011	2016
Aviz RD	6,836	7,366	8,514
Nujin RD	6,839	3,291	2,973
Farashband (city)	17,142	18,492	20,320
Nujin (city)		3,416	3,769
Total	30,817	32,565	35,576
RD = Rural District
