= Farashband County =

County in Fars province, Iran

Farashband County Persian: شهرستان فراشبند
- County
- Location of Farashband County in Fars province (center left, yellow)

- Location of Fars province in Iran
- Coordinates: 28°39′N 52°09′E
- Country: Iran
- Province: Fars
- Capital: Farashband
- Districts: Central, Dehram

Population (2016)
  - Total: 45,459
- Time zone: UTC+3:30 (IRST)

Farashband County (Persian: شهرستان فراشبند) is in Fars province, Iran. Its capital is the city of Farashband.

== History ==
After the 2006 National Census, the villages of Dehram and Nujin were elevated to city status.

== Demographics ==
=== Population ===
At the time of the 2006 census, the county's population was 38,679 in 8,474 households. The following census in 2011 counted 42,760 people in 10,706 households. The 2016 census measured the population of the county as 45,459 in 12,604 households.

=== Administrative divisions ===
Farashband County's population history and administrative structure over three consecutive censuses are shown in the following table.

Farashband County Population
Administrative Divisions	2006	2011	2016
Central District	30,817	32,565	35,576
Aviz RD	6,836	7,366	8,514
Nujin RD	6,839	3,291	2,973
Farashband (city)	17,142	18,492	20,320
Nujin (city)		3,416	3,769
Dehram District	7,862	7,708	8,947
Dehram RD	4,630	1,463	1,478
Dezh Gah RD	3,232	3,246	4,001
Dehram (city)		2,999	3,468
Total	38,679	42,760	45,459
RD = Rural District

== See also ==
Media related to Farashband County at Wikimedia Commons
