= List of towers in Iran =

A tower is a tall structure, taller than it is wide, often by a significant factor. Towers are distinguished from masts by their lack of guy-wires and are therefore, along with tall buildings, self-supporting structures.

== List of Towers in Iran ==
Name	Location	Picture	Notes
A.S.P. Towers	Tehran		They were among the first residential high-rises in Iran and have housed some of the most well-known Iranian figures over the years, including Amir-Abbas Hoveida, a prime-minister of Mohammad Reza Pahlavi. The construction was carried out by A.S.P construction company. The construction is believed to have started in mid-1960s. The complex consists of three buildings which are named A, B and C. The building named A is the greatest and the most luxurious in the complex.
Akhangan Tower	Mashhad County		The Akhangan Tower is a historical Tower belongs to the Timurid Empire and is located in Mashhad County, Razavi Khorasan Province in Iran.
Aladdin Tower	Varamin		Aladdin tower Or Aladole tower Or Gunbad-i Ala al-Din is a monumental tower over tomb of its patron built in Ilkhanid era in centre of Varamin, Iran. The tomb is a cylindrical tower in the inside and a thirty-two right-angled triangular flanges or columns on the outside. Made of high-quality baked bricks assembled in a hazarbaf (decorative brickwork,
Aliabad Tower	Aliabad-e Keshmar		The Aliabad Tower is a grave historical tower of the 14th century in the Aliabad-e Keshmar village near the town of Bardaskan in the Iranian province of Razavi Khorasan Province. The tower height is given as 18 metres, the outer circumference of 42 metres and its internal environment is 21 meters. The cone-shaped facade is composed of Brick The design is reminiscent of the Dakhma of Zoroastrianism. The tower was added to the list of National Monuments of Iran.
Bank Markazi Tower	Tehran		The Tower of Bank Markazi is a high-rise building located in Davoodiyeh neighborhood of Tehran, between Shahid Haghani Expressway and Mirdamad Boulevard. Its facade is made of dark blue reflective glasses, making it a reverse panopticon. The building belongs to the Central Bank of Iran.
Firuzabad Tower	Firuzabad		The Firuzabad Tower is a grave historical tower of Great Seljuq Empire era that is located 17 km south of Bardaskan in Firuzabad village at Shahrabad District on old Torshiz. Archaeological evidence confirms the habitat of Islam until the seventh century AH, which is around the province and shining star of the eighth Imam of Appreciation through Ali ar-Ridha of this was the route. Cylindrical shape with an outward current height of the minarets and 18 meters with decorative elements and architectural style reflects the bricklayer is a mystery. The tower was added to the list of National Monuments of Iran As the 91st monument.
Goldis Tower	Tehran		Goldis Tower is a shopping center located in the commercial district of Sadeghiyeh (Aryashahr) in west of Tehran, Iran. It is a 13-floors building among which 3 first floors are commercial and the upper 10 floors serve as office use.
Gonbad-e Qabus	Gonbad-e Kavus		The inscription bands on the tower, written in rhymed prose, state that Qabus ordered the foundation of the tower built during his lifetime, in 1006/7. He was a prince of the Ziyarid dynasty, which was based in the historic Tabaristan region of northern Iran. In the 11th century this region was still undergoing conversion from Zoroastrianism to Islam. The foundation date on the monument is given in two calendar styles: Iranian solar and Islamic lunar.
Kashaneh Tower	Shahrud County		The Kashaneh Tower is a historical Tower belongs to the Seventh century AH and is located in Shahrud County, Semnan Province in Iran.
Lajim Tower	Savadkuh County		The Lajim Tower is a historical Tower belongs to the Ziyarid dynasty and is located in Savadkuh County, Mazandaran Province in Iran.
Milad Tower	Tehran		The construction of the tower was commenced in 1997. Upon completion of its construction in the mid 2000s, the Milad Tower was considered the fourth-tallest freestanding telecommunication tower in the world. While the tower opened in 2007, numerous conflicts on the history of the tower still prevail, partly because sections of the tower were open to visitors once the elevators started operating during construction and the tower was still far from finished. The design of the project was headed by Iranian architect Mohammad Reza Hafezi. The general contractor was the company of Boland Payeh, and the main client and investor was the company of Yadman Sazeh, a representative of the Municipality of Tehran.
Minar	Firuzabad, Fars		The structure is known as Minar (منار, literally "pillar") or Minaret (مناره) in New Persian, while the medieval Arabic-language Islamic sources referred to the structure as Terbal (طربال Ṭirbāl). Similar structures, i.e., staged tower with an outside ramp, have been recorded by ancient historians, including a tower mentioned by Ammianus Marcellinus at the Nahar Malka (near the Sasanian capital Ctesiphon; he compared it to the Lighthouse of Alexandria), several towers at Pirisabora (al-Anbar) mentioned by Zosimus, and the Borsippa tower near Babylon. These in turn may have been based on the ziggurats of the ancient Near East.
Pars El-Gölü Hotel	Tabriz		Pars El-Gölü Hotel is a five star hotel with 179 rooms located near the El-Gölü in Tabriz, East Azerbaijan, Iran. The hotel opened in 2002 as the Pars Hotels investment company.
Radkan Tower	Chenaran County		The Radkan Tower is a historical Tower belongs to the Ilkhanate and is located in Chenaran County, Razavi Khorasan Province in Iran.
Radkan Tower	Kordkuy County		The Radkan Tower is a historical Tower belongs to the Bavand dynasty and is located in Kordkuy County, Golestan Province in Iran.
Resket Tower	Sari		The Resket Tower is a monument in Sari, Iran. The tower was constructed in the 11th-century. A stucco is written on the entrance, in Arabic and Pahlavi, which states that the mausoleum was built for the two Bavandid princes Hormozdiyar and Habusiyar. The person behind the construction of the tower was most likely the father of the two princes, named Masdara.
Sa'at Tower	Tabriz		The municipality building was designed by architect Avedis Ohanjanian, and built in 1934 as the Tabriz municipal central office and its city hall. Before World War II it was used by the Azerbaijan Democrat Party as the Government Office, where cabinet meeting used to be held in its main hall. When Iranian troops regained control of Tabriz in 1947, the building was again used as the Tabriz municipal central offices, a function which has continued up to early 2000s when it is used as municipal museum.
Sepehr Tower	Tehran		Sepehr Tower is a 115 metre high building in Tehran, Iran. Sepehr Tower was Tehran's tallest building at the time of its completion at 33 floors. It is located in Somayyeh St. close to the junction of Taleghani Ave and Dr. Mofatteh Street at coordinates 35°42′22″N 51°25′38″E. The construction of the Tower was delayed for years due to the 1979 revolution. It now houses the head offices of Saderat Bank of Iran.
Shahran Tower	Tabriz		Shahran Tower is the tallest residential tower in Iranian Azerbaijan. It is located in Tabriz, Iran.
Shebeli Tower	Damavand		Shebeli Tower is a historical tower in Damavand, in Tehran Province of Iran. Standing approximately 10 metres (33 ft) tall, the structure is a roofed octagon tomb of Sheikh Shebeli, a Sufi mystic. A sardāb (basement) also exists under the structure. The structure is a remnant of the Samanid era, making it from the 12th century, at the latest, and is similar in design to extant structures in Bukhara. The structure recently underwent some preservations.
Tabriz Fire Fighting Tower	Tabriz		The Tabriz Firefighting Tower is a historical tower located in Tabriz, Iran. The tower, standing at 23 meters high, was built in 1917. It was used to investigate fire related incidents inside the city. The city was constantly observed from this tower for any signs of smoke and fire. Following any visual evidence, the firemen were informed and sent to the fire incident location. The firefighting station of Tabriz, which is the first firefighting station in Iran, was established in 1832.
Tehran International Tower	Tehran		Structural Towers consists of walls of reinforced concrete sub and ceilings as well as a slab of concrete design and are made with concrete wall core along the three wing angle 120 degrees from each other. Also the walls have subsidiary design and the main walls are perpendicular. Additional pieces of the original structure and design of this tower are based on safety standards. Garages as well as concrete structures and retaining walls are designed and implemented in this Tower. The Tower also has Intelligent control system including internal computer network, energy management, network control, CCTV cameras, fire systems, control systems and traffic control.
Toghrol Tower	Rey		Tuğrul Tower (also transliterated Toghrul, Tughrol, or Tughrul) is a 12th-century monument, located in the city of Rey, Iran. Tuğrul Tower is near Rashkan Castle. The 20-metre-tall (66 ft) brick tower is the tomb of Seljuk ruler Tuğrul Beg, who died in Rey in 1063. Originally, like other monuments of its time, it was capped by a conical dome (گنبد, gonbad), which would have added to its height. The dome collapsed during an earthquake.
Tomb of Haydar Amuli	Amol		The Tomb of Haydar Amuli or Mir Heydar Amoli Tomb Tower and Monument Seyyed Se Tan is the burial place of Haydar Amuli, the Iranian Mystic and Philosopher. The mausoleum is located in Amol, Iran. Tomb production date, the primary structure was built 6th century AD. The Building brick and octagonal tower and pyramidal dome with height of 12 meters. Two other erudite has been buried here, Izz al-Din Amuli founder mausoleum, himself was a mathematician.
World Trade Center Tabriz	Tabriz		The Tabriz World Trade Center is the tallest structure in Tabriz, Iranian Azerbaijan. The building is a 37-storey building with a height of 152 m.
Zoroastrians Dakhmeh	Kerman		The Zoroastrians Dakhmeh is a historic Dakhmeh from the Qajar era and is located in Kerman, Kerman province in Iran.
Zoroastrians Dakhmeh	Yazd		The Zoroastrians Dakhmeh is a historic Dakhmeh located in Yazd, Yazd province in Iran.
