= Burial tree =

Tree or simple structure used for supporting corpses

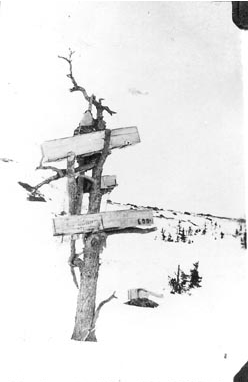
Inuit tree burial, Leaf River, Quebec, c. 1924–1936

A burial tree or burial scaffold is a tree or simple structure used for supporting corpses or coffins. They were once common among the Balinese, the Naga people, certain Aboriginal Australians, and the Sioux and other North American First Nations.

== North America First Nations ==
=== Burial tree ===
A number of Native Americans used a burial tree as either a final or intermediate resting place for a dead relative, either as the general rule (along with a scaffold) or as an alternative to a grave.

The corpse was wrapped up carefully in a robe or blankets and either placed in a fork of the tree or tied to a heavy branch. Both grown persons and small children were laid to rest in this way. A burial tree could carry more than one dead. Maximilian zu Wied saw burial trees with red painted trunk and branches among the Assiniboine Indians. It seems any tree was proper. Cottonwood is mentioned by travelers on the great plains, as well as pine and cedar. The dead could be placed from around six feet up in the tree to close to the top. Some of the belongings of the deceased were often placed near the corpse.

=== Scaffold ===
A burial scaffold was usually made of four upright poles or branches, forked at the top. This foundation carried a sort of bier, where the dead body was laid to rest out of reach of wolves. The preferred location was on a hill. Relatives would often place some of the belongings of the dead on the platform or around the scaffold.

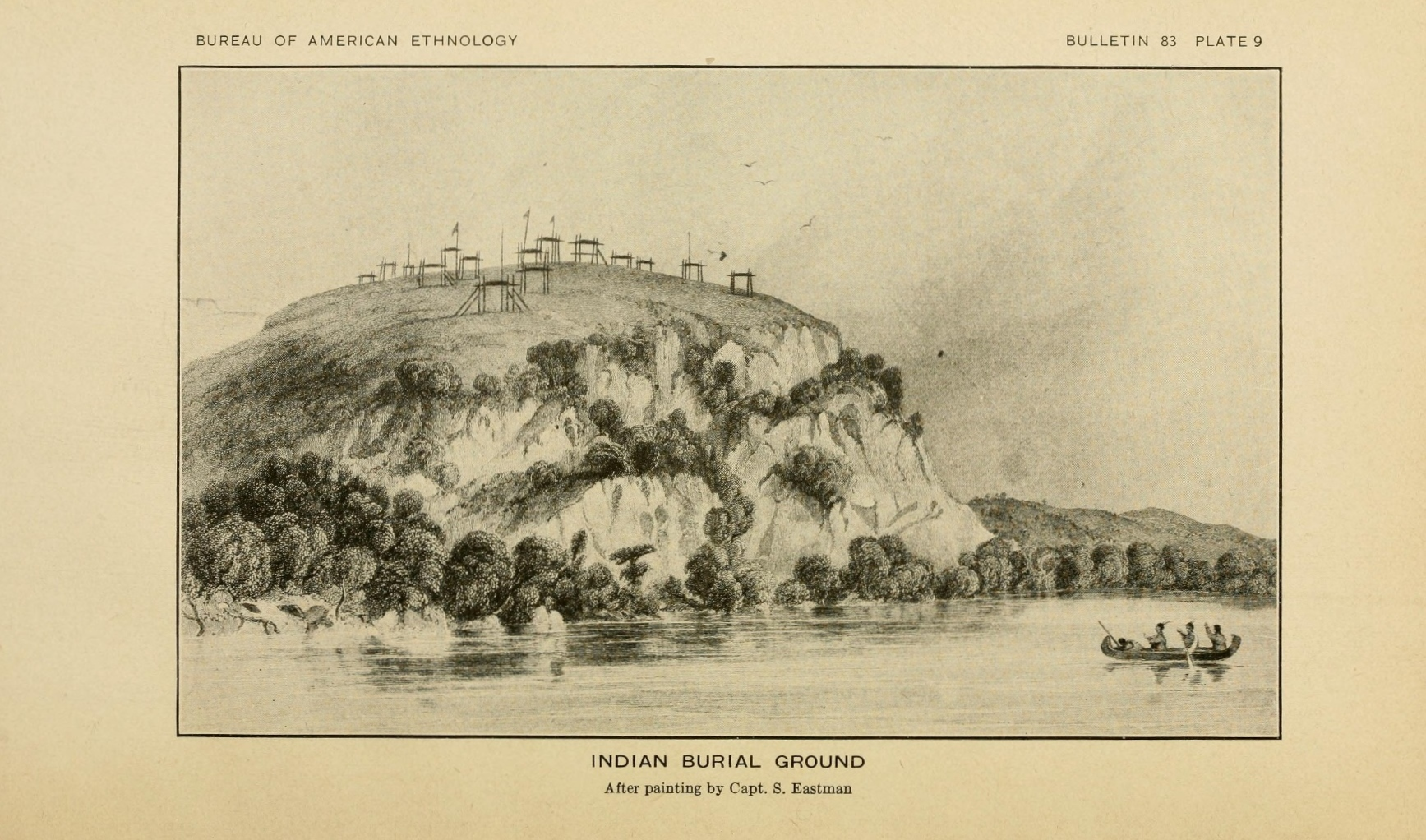
Etching of an Indian burial ground by S. Eastman

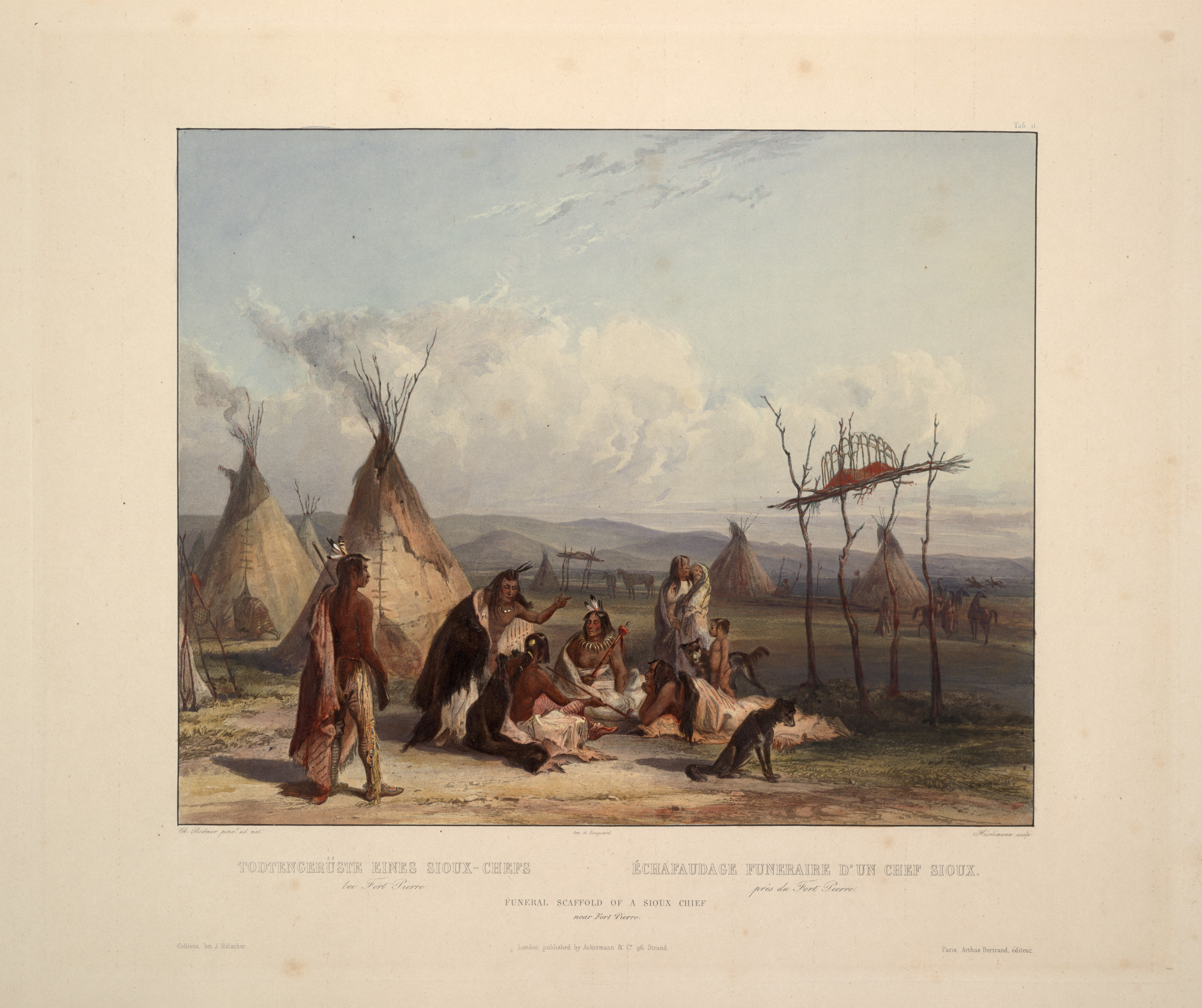
Funeral scaffold of a Sioux chief. Something like a travois basket is placed over the muffled up body. The Cheyennes used now and then the same method of protecting the corpse.

The poles reached "a man's height above ground" (six to eight feet). An extraordinarily high scaffold carried the corpse of a Sisseton Sioux an estimated 18 feet above the ground. One scaffold described had poles painted black and red in horizontal stripes. An 1849 Nebraska traveler saw a scaffold made of lodge poles rested against each other at the top and with two biers halfway down.

An Ojibwe man would get his arms and other personal effects with him on the scaffold along with food, eating utensils and tobacco. This practice may have been used only as a temporary solution when death occurred far from the common burial ground with graves and markers. Birch bark served as an option to a body wrapping of skin among the Ojibwe.

In the 18th century, the Choctaw placed the dead on a scaffold as a first step in a burial process. Months later, bone pickers stripped the flesh from the bones. The skeleton was then cleaned and piece by piece put in a sort of small coffin and lastly placed in the Indian city's special bone house.

The personal effects of an Indian woman were laid with her in an open pine box (likely made by a carpenter) situated on a scaffold put up near Fort Laramie in 1866. The heads and tails of her two ponies were fastened to respectively the eastern and the western poles.

Among the Crow, the dead was wrapped in a robe and placed on the bier with the feet to the east. Much later, the bones could be collected and placed in a rock gap.

The Mandan Indians positioned the dead body on the scaffold with the feet to the southeast, so the spirit was directed to the old Mandan country around Heart River, North Dakota. With the scaffold rotten and on the ground, the bones were wrapped in a hide and buried in the refuse at the Mandan village or in a riverbank. The skull would be placed among other clan skulls arranged in circles on the ground near the scaffolds. Newborns, who died unnamed, were not considered members of the society and hence placed in trees (or buried) away from the common burial ground outside the village.

=== Reasons for burials in trees and on scaffolds ===
During winter, the Ponca Indians would often substitute a grave with a scaffold because the ground was frozen. A Lakota summed up the reasons why a high scaffold outdid a grave, "(1) Animals or persons might walk over the graves; (2) the dead might lie in mud and water after rain or snow; (3) wolves might dig up the bodies and devour them." With the dead placed on a scaffold or in a tree, the relatives could easily talk to the deceased.

== Gallery ==
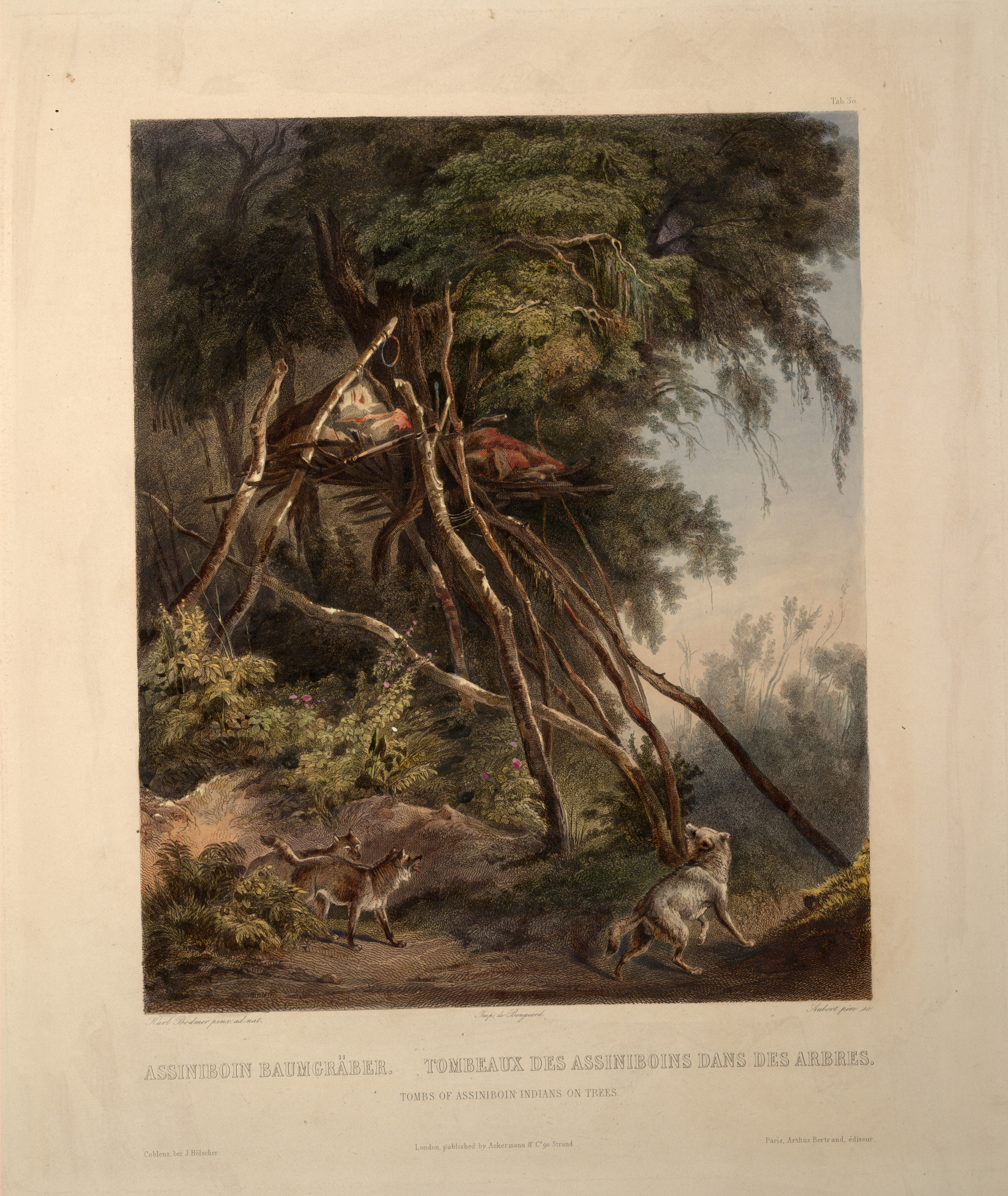
Tombs of Assiniboin Indians on trees 0063v. Maximilian zu Wied saw the bodies of Assiniboine Indians placed like this during his travel up Missouri River in 1833. Picture by Karl Bodmer.

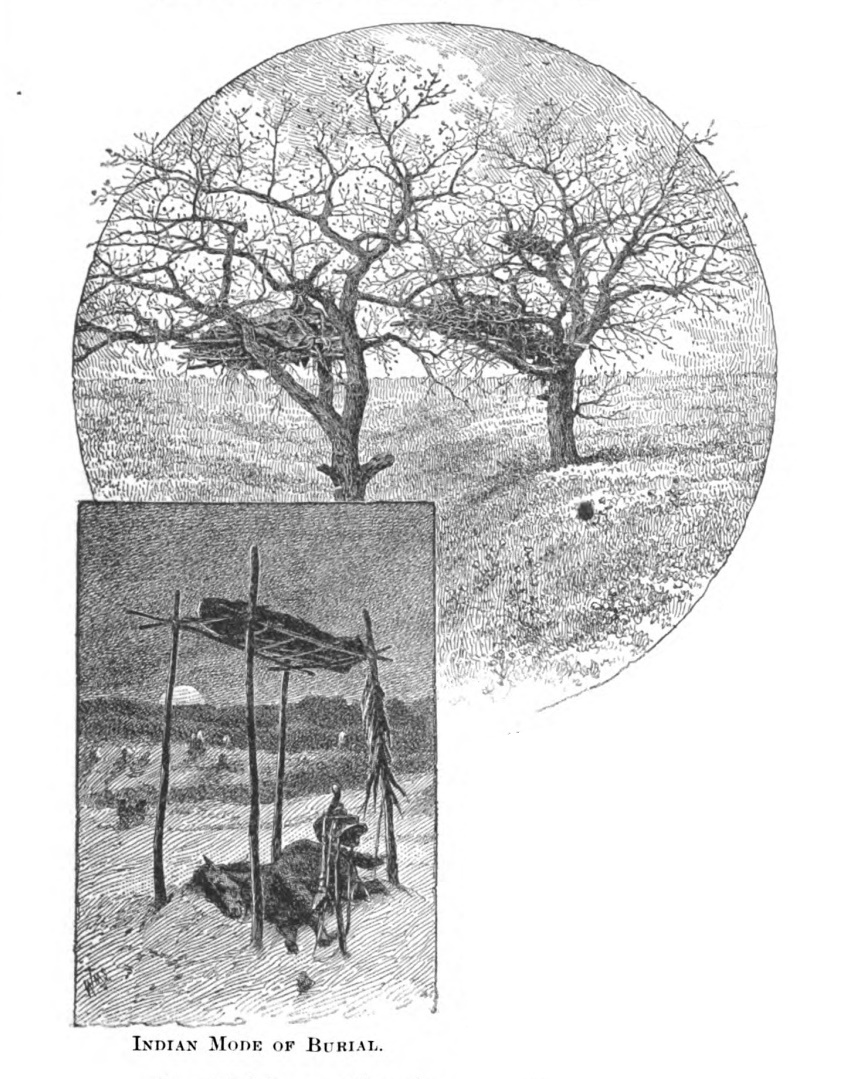
A tree burial and a scaffold – used by a number of Indians in North America

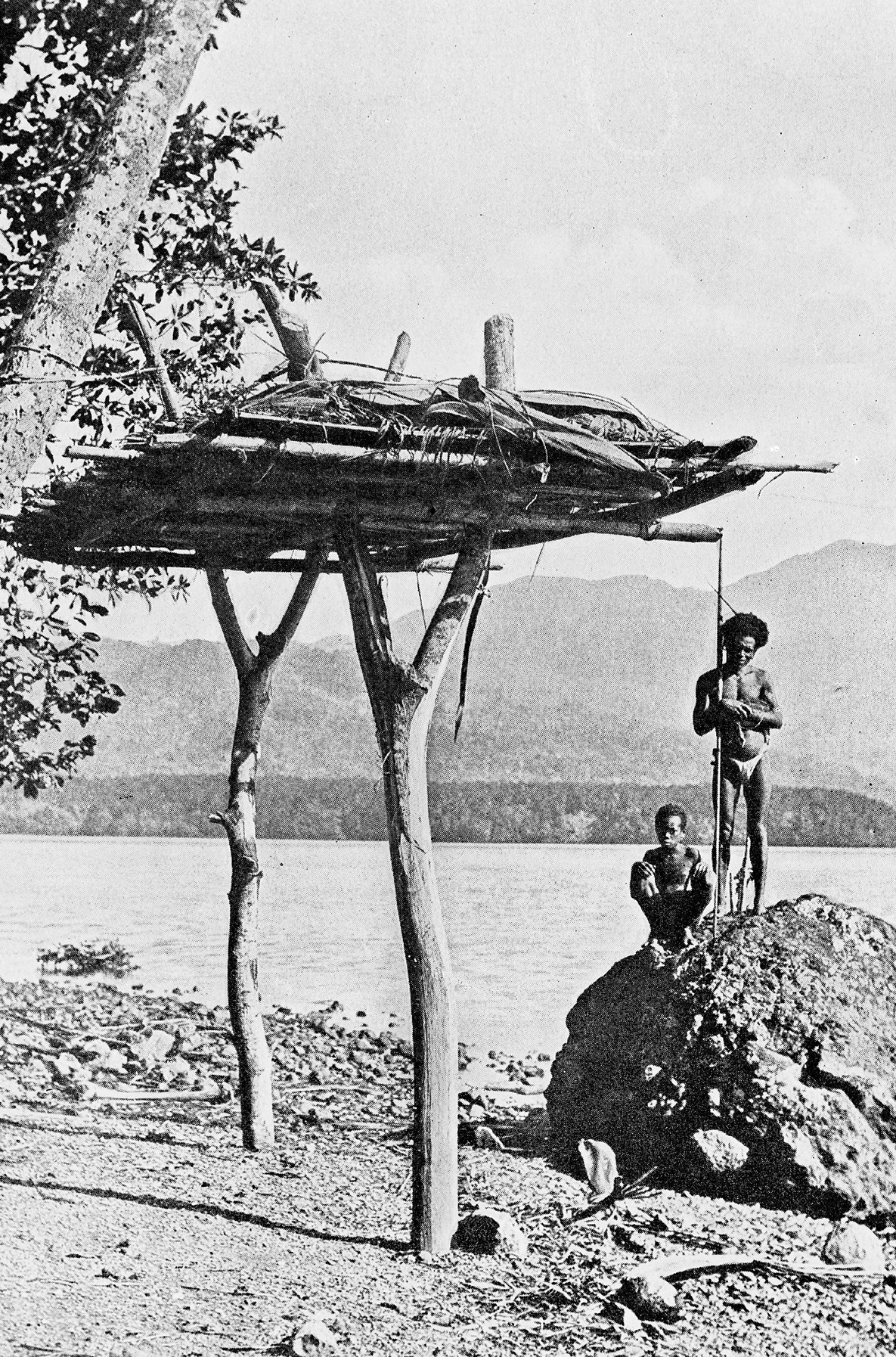
Tree-based "platform for dead bodies" used in British New Guinea, 1886

== See also ==
- Sky burial
- Tower of Silence
- Disposal of human corpses
- Burial at sea
- Tree pod burial
