= Lajim Tower =

Mausoleum and tower monument in Lajim, Mazandaran, Iran

- برج لاجیم
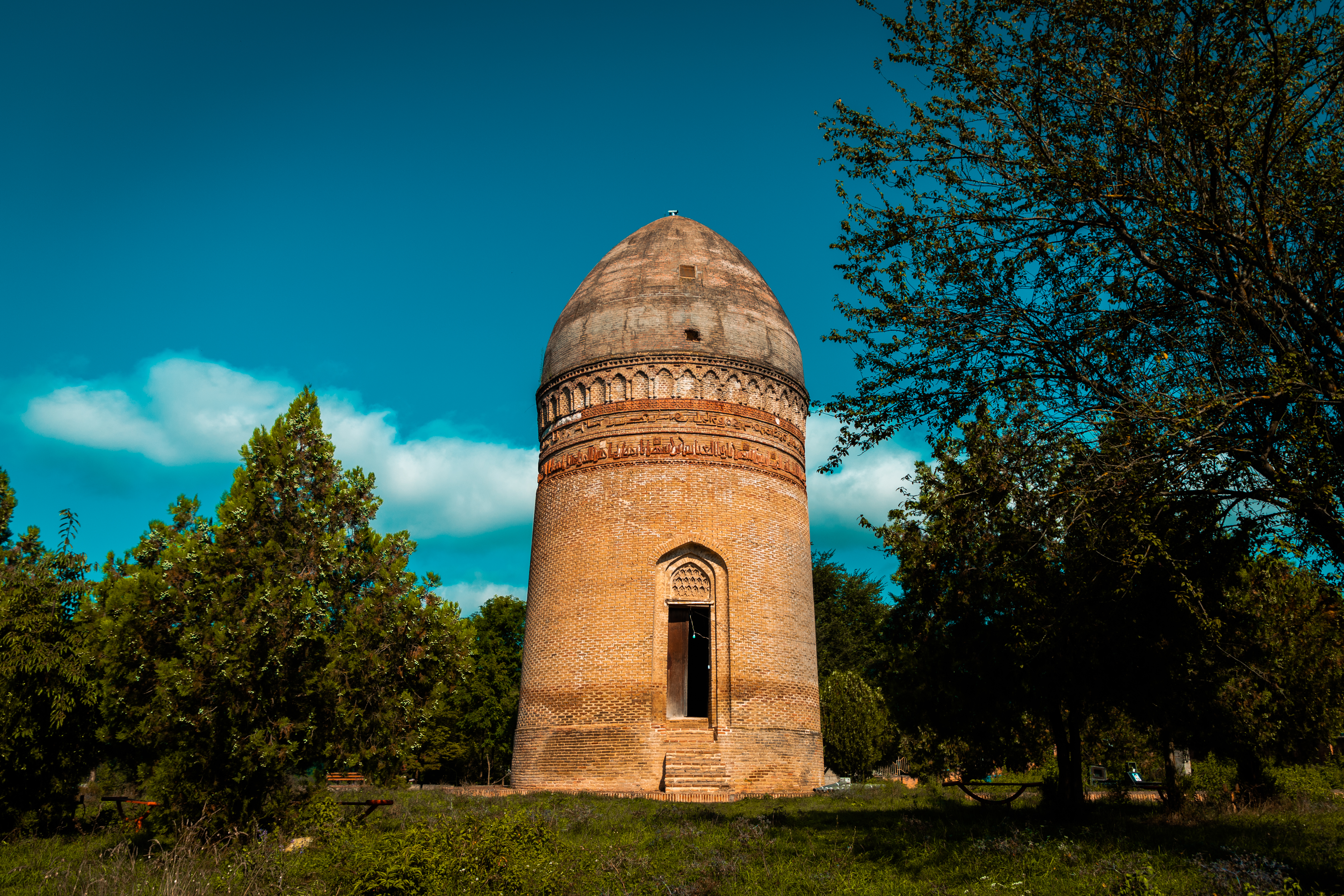
- Lajim Tower, in 2020

- Location of the monument in Iran

Religion
- Affiliation: Islam
- Ecclesiastical or organisational status: Mausoleum and monument
- Status: Active

Location
- Location: Lajim, Savadkuh County, Mazandaran province
- Country: Iran
- Interactive map of Lajim Tower
- Coordinates: 36°15′20″N 53°06′21″E

Architecture
- Type: Islamic architecture
- Style: Bavandid; Ziyarid
- Completed: 413 AH (1022/1023 CE)

Specifications
- Dome: One (double)
- Dome height (outer): 14 m (46 ft)
- Dome dia. (outer): 9 m (30 ft)
- Dome dia. (inner): 5.47 m (17.9 ft)
- Inscriptions: Two (in Pahlavi and Kufic)
- Materials: Bricks; plaster

Iran National Heritage List
- Official name: Lajim Tower
- Type: Funerary Tower
- Designated: 1932
- Reference no.: 185
- Conservation organization: Cultural Heritage, Handicrafts and Tourism Organization of Iran

The Lajim Tower (Persian: برج لاجیم, romanized: Borj-e Lajim), also known as Tomb Tower of Lajim, (Note: Other names include the Burj-e Lajim, the Burj-i Lajim, the Imamzadeh Abdollah, the Imamzadeh Abdullah, and the Imamzada Abdallah.) is a 14-metre-high (46 ft) cylindrical tower used as a mausoleum, that is located in the village of Lajim near Savadkuh, in the province of Mazandaran, Iran. The tower was completed in 413 AH (1022/1023 CE), during the Bavand dynasty that ruled over the region at the time.

The mausoleum was added to the Iran National Heritage List on 24 January 1935 and is administered by the Cultural Heritage, Handicrafts and Tourism Organization of Iran.

== Architecture ==
The tower has a cylindrical burial chamber crowned by a double dome, though the outer dome has not survived. It is likely the outer dome was originally conical in shape, typical for tomb towers in the region from the same period. The interior of the building, from the base to the conical dome, is perfectly round. The entrance to the burial chamber is on the eastern side.

The structure is 14 metres (46 ft) high, with an outer diameter of 9 metres (30 ft). From the base to the conical dome, the diameter of the tower is 5.47 metres (17.9 ft). (Note: Although one other source has widely different measurements.)

Decorative features are concentrated below the dome surrounding the entrance. Directly below the dome is a row of shallow arched niches. Below this is a narrow band of geometric patterns, separating it from two inscriptive bands. The upper band is written in Pahlavi, the language of the pre-Islamic Sasanian Empire, and the lower band is in the Kufic calligraphic style. The Pahlavi inscription is largely damaged and has not yet been deciphered. The Kufic inscription contains the name of the person buried in the tomb – Abu'l Favaris Shahriyar bin Abbas bin Shahriyar, and bears the date 413 AH (1022/1023 CE).

It has been claimed that the Kufic inscription reads, in Persian:

Persian: ēn ān ī gumbad <ī> Abulwari(s) Šahryār bin Abbas bin Šahryār. Cihrzād mād ī ōy. ādarōg Cihr[zā]d *duxt bin Silēxūr bin […]sy[…]t[…]s/š māh šahr[iwar] wad[ … ] marzēn ēn gōmbad <ī> šāh tuwānmand sāl 300 90 māh frawardīn bun frōd kard., lit. 'This is the dome of Abulfaris Šahryār son of Abbas son of Šahryār. Cihrzād is his mother. An Ādarōg Fire *Cihrzād daughter of *Silēxūr of [ … ] in the month of Šahriwar [ … ] laid down the foundations of the dome of the powerful king in the year 390, month of Frawardīn.'

— Translated from Middle Persian into English by Carlo G. Cereti.

The Lajim Tower inscriptions represent the first known use of the word "qubba" referring to the domed structure of the building, demonstrating the architectural influence of Islam in the region. The tower was an important monument that drew the attention of North Iranian rulers who valued pre-Islamic art and script.

The entranceway is crowned by a pointed arch and set inside a shallow niche with a second pointed arch. Its tympanum features a brick honeycomb pattern. The plain cylindrical interior chamber is lit solely by the entrance.

== Use ==
For many years, it was believed that the tower contained the tomb of Imamzadeh Abdullah, a misconception subsequently corrected. The tower was originally a military structure, part of the Bavand rulers' fortifications. However, it later became the burial site for a prominent figure of the Bavand dynasty.

In 1938, the tower was restored from materials sourced in Tehran in partnership with the Shirgah Traverse Manufacturing factory. Further restorations were completed in the 1990s to repair serious damage to the Kufic inscription, took.

Since these restorations, the tower has become an Islamic pilgrimage site for residents of the Lajim village and surrounding rural areas of Savadkuh. The ornately carved inscriptions under the dome make the brick structure an artistically significant example of ancient Iranian architecture and design.

== See also ==
- Islam in Iran
- List of mausoleums in Iran
- List of towers in Iran
- Resket Tower
