= Hirji Vacha Modi =

Hirji Vacha Modi, known by many orthographic variations, including Mody Hirjee Wacha, was a wealthy Parsi businessman who was responsible for constructing the first Parsi Tower of Silence in Mumbai in 1672. He also built the first fire temple in Mumbai in the Modikhana area of Fort in 1671. This was later destroyed in the great fire of 1803.

He was also a founder of the Bombay Parsi Punchayet.
