= Tabriz Fire Fighting Tower =

Historical tower in Iran

Coordinates: 38°04′36.49″N 46°17′58.02″E

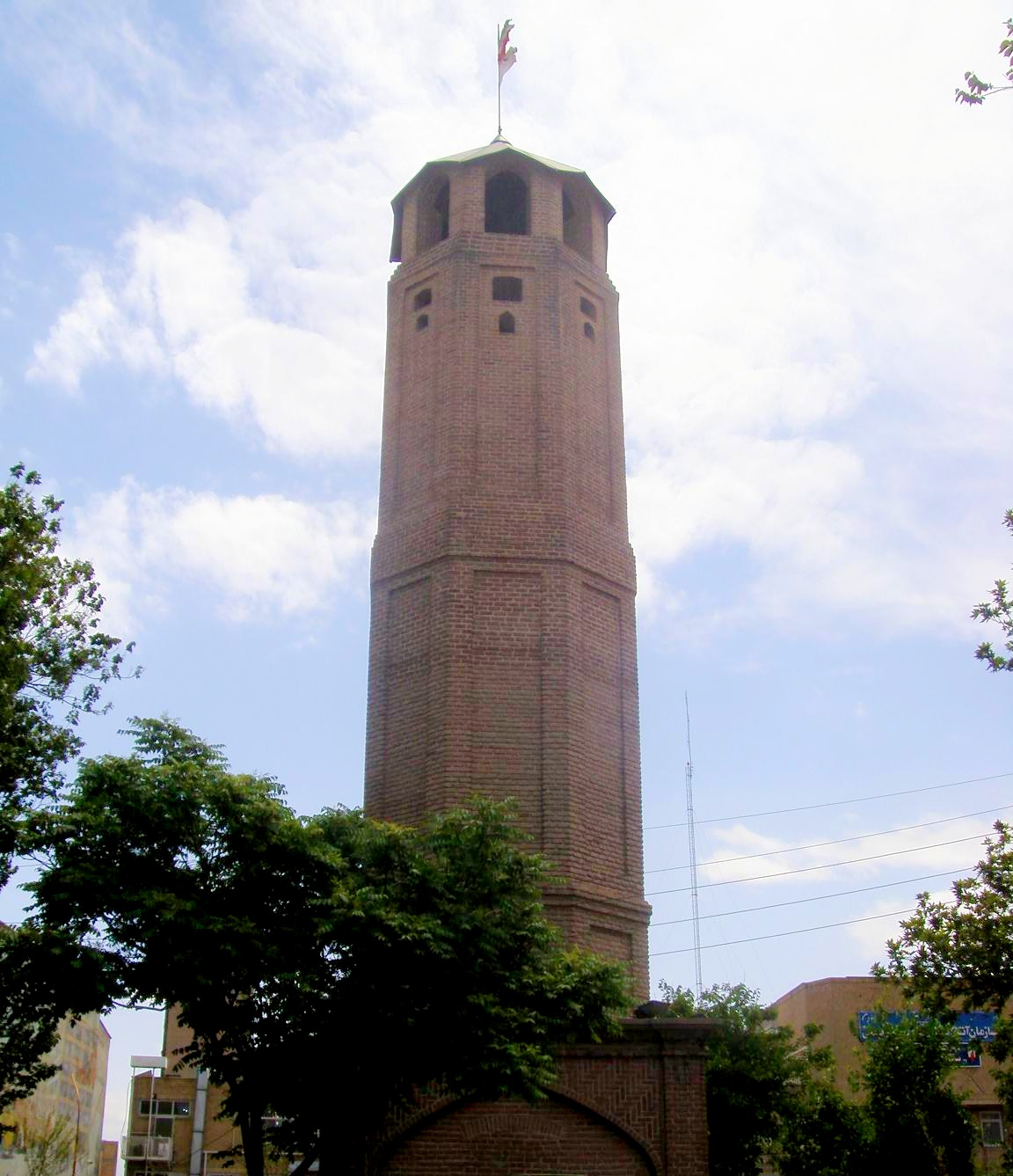
Tabriz Firefighting Tower

The Tabriz Firefighting Tower (also Yangin Tower; Persian: برج آتش نشانی, Azerbaijani: يانگين کوله سی) is a historical tower located in Tabriz, Iran. The tower, standing at 23 meters high, was built in 1917. It was used to investigate fire related incidents inside the city. The city was constantly observed from this tower for any signs of smoke and fire. Following any visual evidence, the firemen were informed and sent to the fire incident location.

The firefighting station of Tabriz, which is the first firefighting station in Iran, was established in 1832.
