= Pars El-Gölü Hotel =

Hotel in Tabriz, Iran

Pars El-Goli Hotel
- Pars El-Goli Hotel
- Interactive map of the Pars El-Goli Hotel area

General information
- Location: Tabriz, Iran
- Coordinates: 46.2205°N 38.0114°E
- Opening: 2002
- Owner: Esmaeil Jamee Oskouei
- Management: Pars Hotels investment company

Other information
- Number of rooms: 179
- Number of suites: 20
- Number of restaurants: 3

Website
- http://ir.pars-hotels.com/

Pars El-Goli Hotel (Persian: هتل پارس ایل‌گلی) is a five star hotel with 179 rooms located near the El-Goli in Tabriz, East Azerbaijan, Iran. The hotel opened in 2002 as the Pars Hotels investment company.
