= Yazd Tower of Silence =

Coordinates: 31.8229°N 54.3548°E

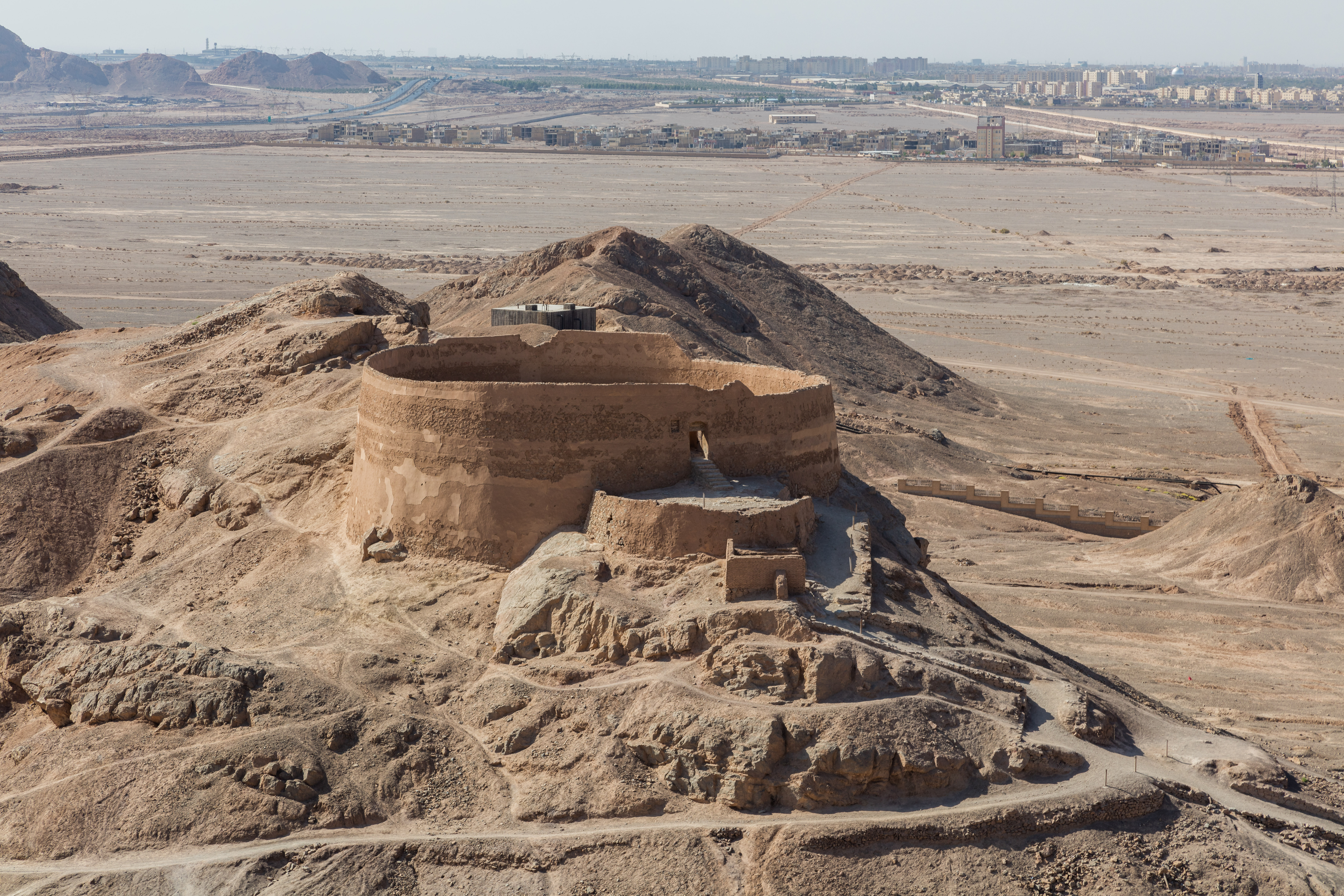
- Interactive map of Yazd Tower of Silence
- Location: Yazd, Iran
- Owner: Ministry of Cultural Heritage, Handicrafts and Tourism

The Yazd Tower of Silence (Persian: برج خاموشان یزد) or the Yazd Dakhma (Persian: دخمه یزد) is a Zoroastrian tower of silence 15 kilometres south east of Yazd, Iran.

== Use ==
Zoroastrians believe that earth, fire and water are all holy elements, and thus do not pollute them by burying, burning or placing their dead in water. Instead, they place their dead on a tower of silence, letting vultures consume the corpses. In the middle of the tower is a pit known as Ostudan (Persian: استودان) where the remaining bones are placed after they are stripped of the flesh.

According to a tradition dating back over 3,000 years, dead bodies were left on top of those open towers – which are also called dakhmas – to be slowly disengaged or picked apart by desert vultures.

Under ancient Zoroastrian beliefs about the purity of the Earth, dead bodies were not buried but left in these uncovered stone towers so that vultures could pick the bones clean.

Narratives say that men's corpses were placed in the outer circle, while women's were left in the middle, and children in the inner-most ring. Bodies were then left until their bones were bleached by the elements and stripped by the vultures.

After the process of purification, bones were placed in ossuaries near, or inside the towers.

== History ==
Ossuaries from these rituals have been discovered from the 4th and 5th centuries BC. This practice, however, has been banned in Iran since 1966–1967, and subsequently no bodies have been placed in this tower of silence.

It is included in the list of national heritage sites of Iran with the number 6312.

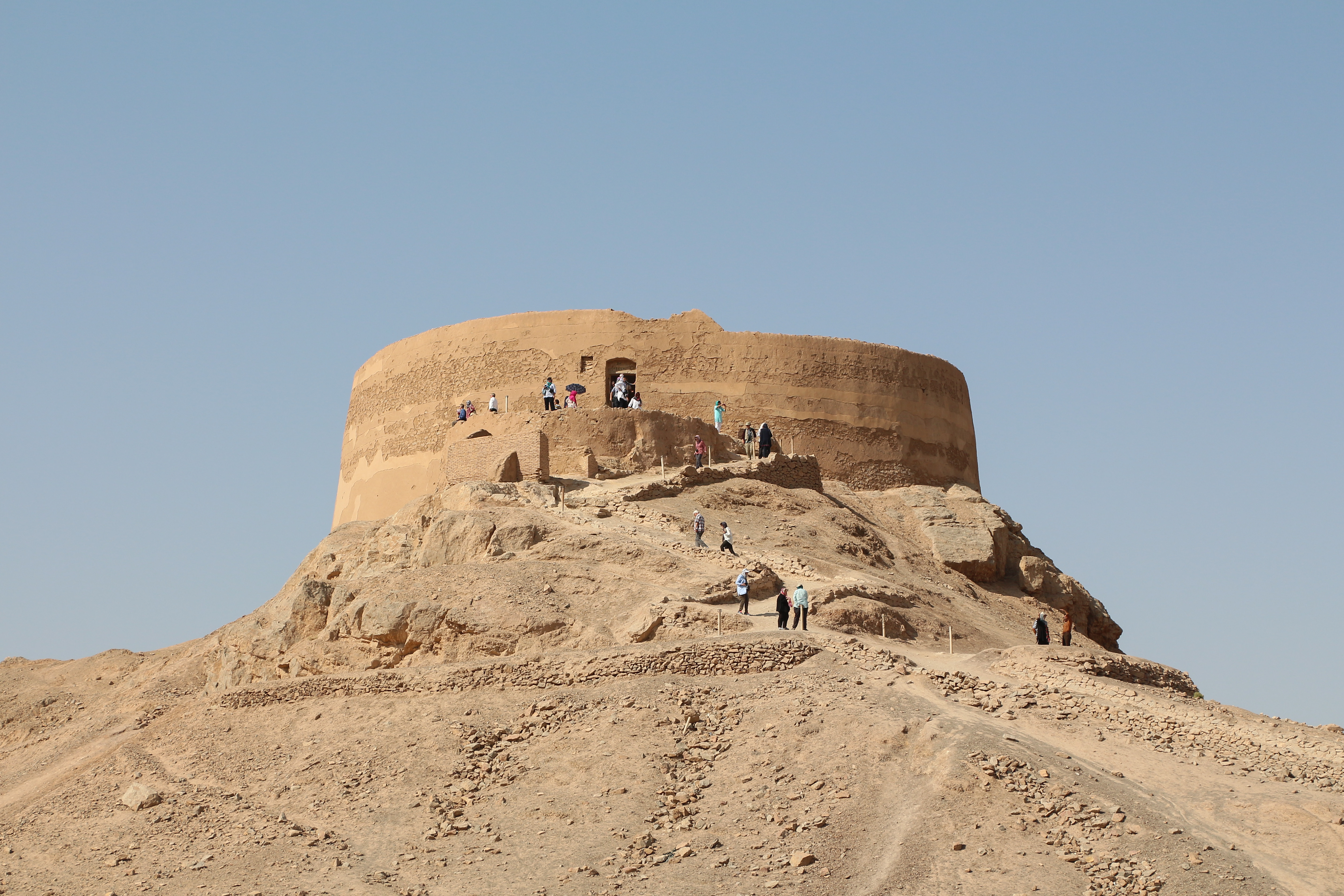

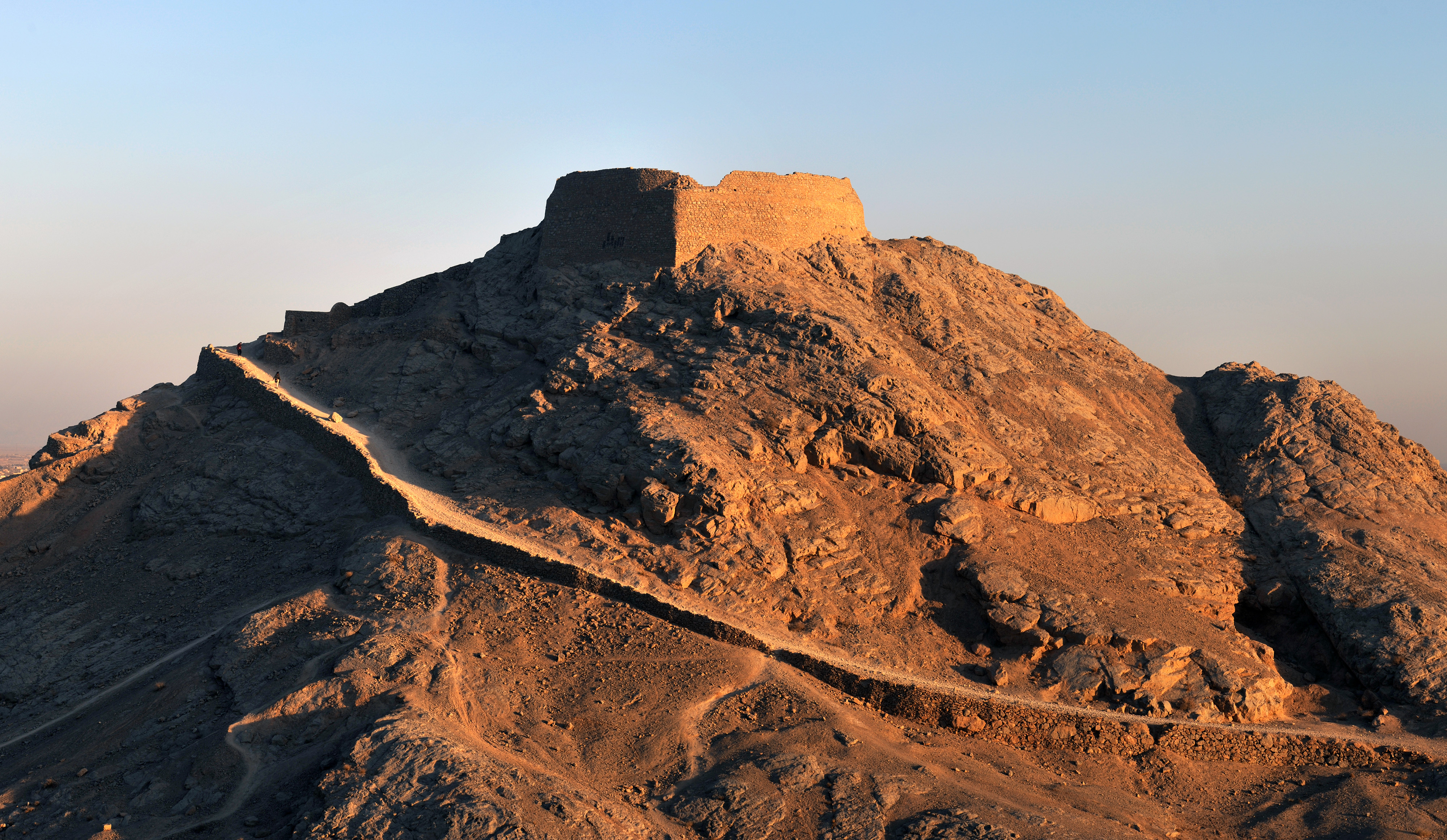

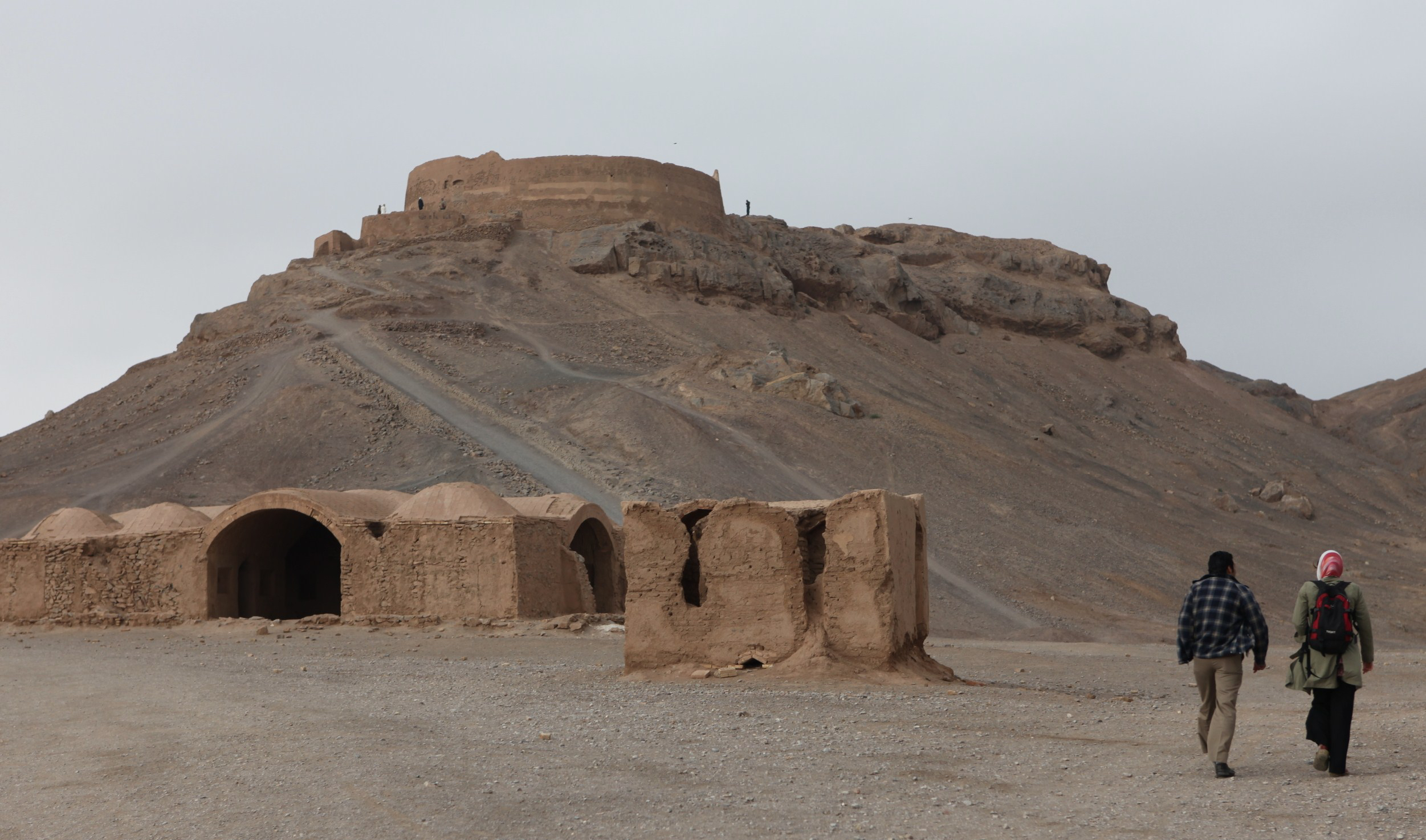

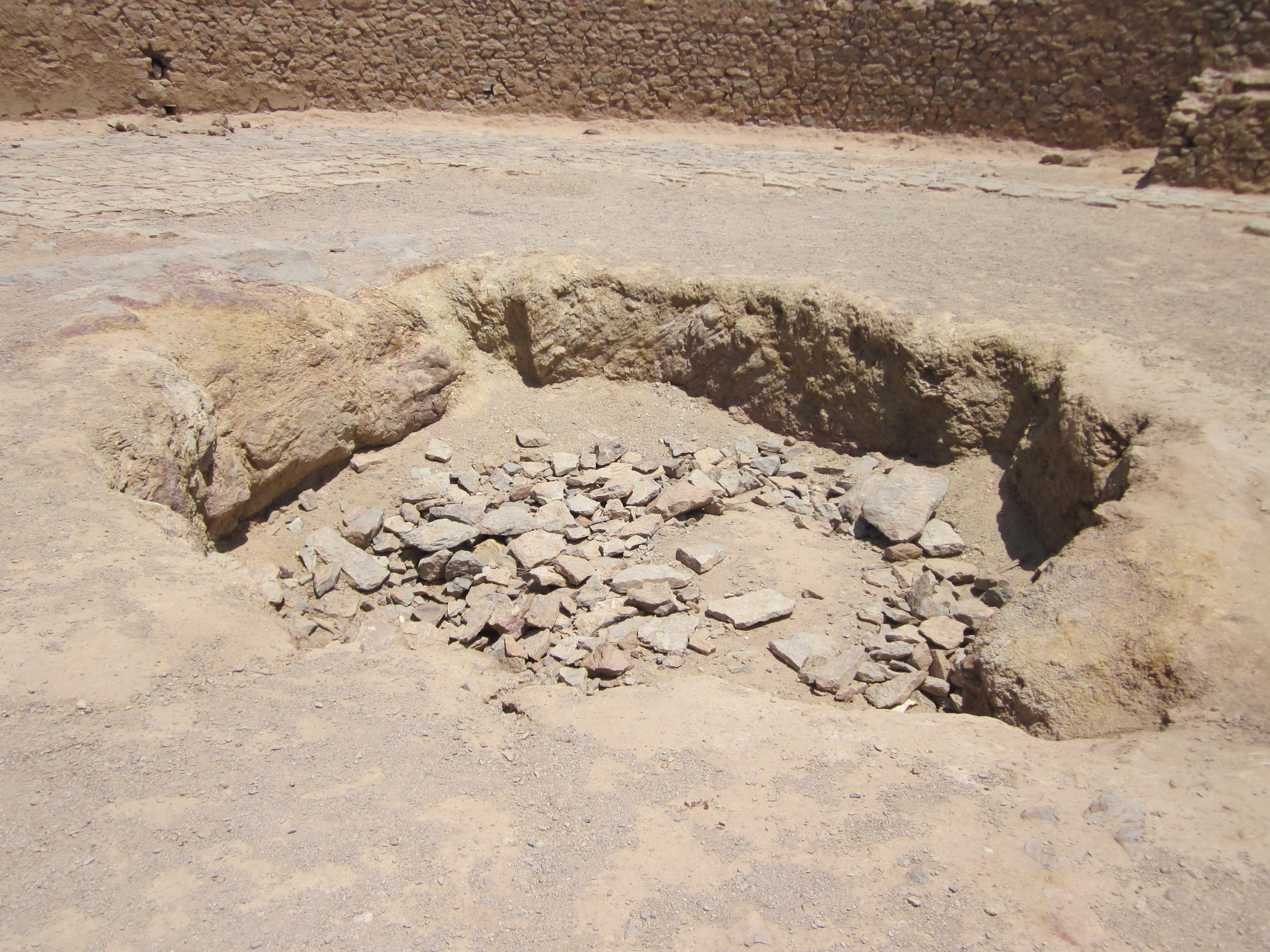
