= Tower of Silence =

Zoroastrian excarnation structure

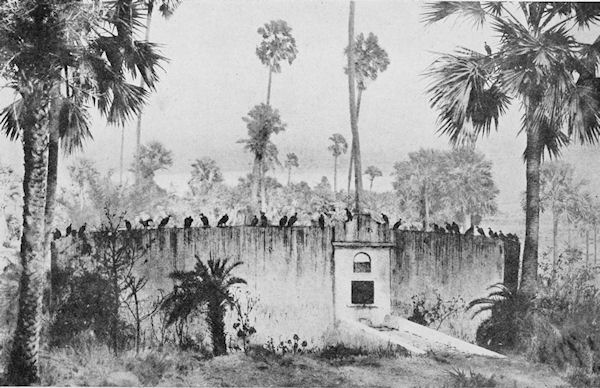
Early 20th century drawing of the dakhma on Malabar Hill, Bombay (now Mumbai)

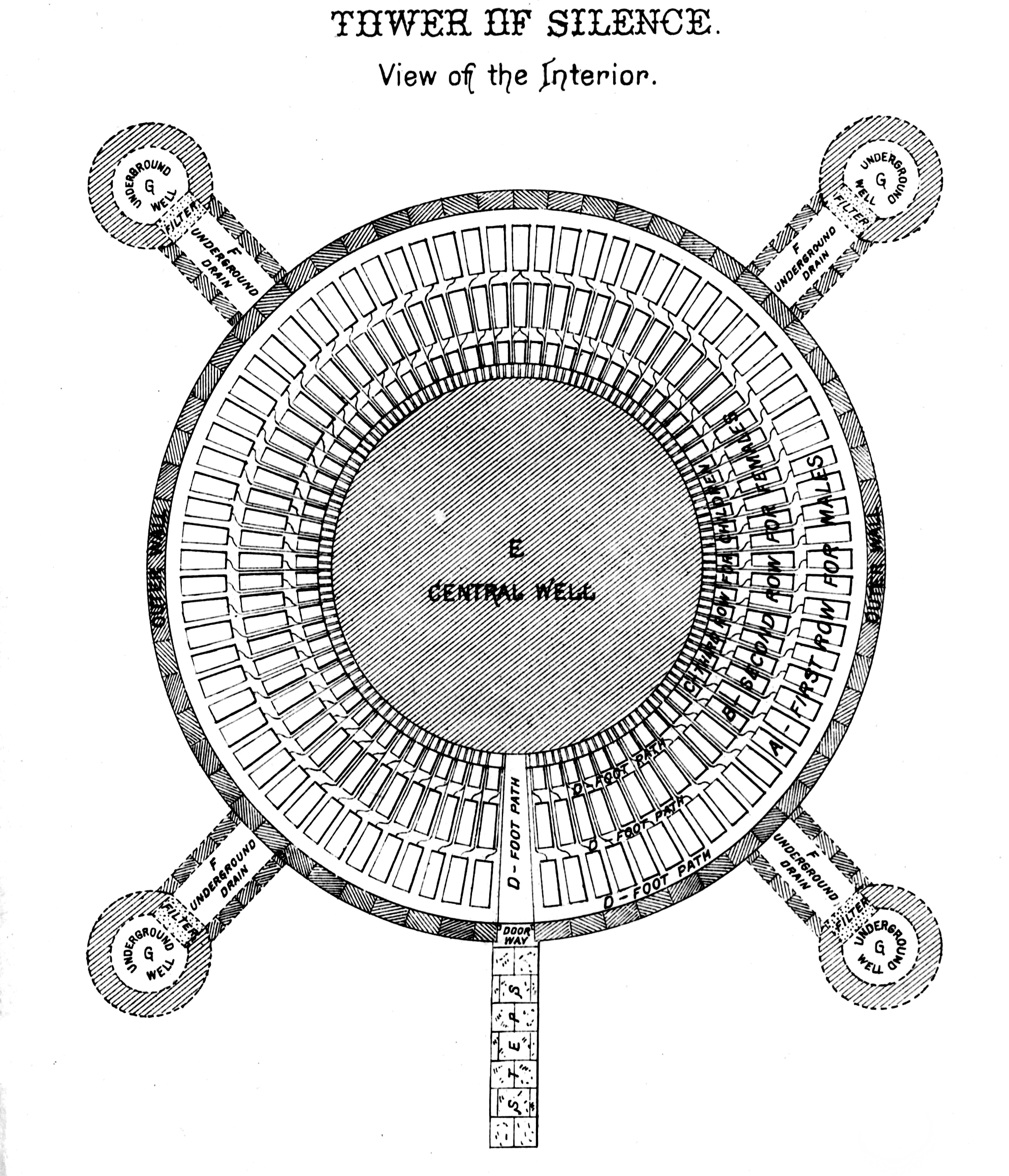
Interior view of dakhma

A dakhma (Persian: دخمه), also known as a Tower of Silence (Persian: برجِ خاموشان), is a circular, raised structure built by Zoroastrians for excarnation (that is, the exposure of human corpses to the elements for decomposition), in order to avoid contamination of the soil and other natural elements by the dead bodies. Carrion birds, usually vultures, and other scavengers, consume the flesh. Skeletal remains are gathered into a central pit where further weathering and continued breakdown occurs.

== Ritual exposure by Iranian peoples ==
Zoroastrian ritual exposure of the dead is first attested in the mid-5th century BCE Histories of Herodotus, an Ancient Greek historian who observed the custom amongst Iranian expatriates in Asia Minor (however, there is no mention of the use of towers, as this is first documented in the early 9th century CE). In Herodotus' account (in Histories i.140), the Zoroastrian funerary rites are said to have been "secret"; however they were first performed after the body had been dragged around by a bird or dog. The corpse was then embalmed with wax and laid in a trench.

Writing on the culture of the Persians, Herodotus reports on the Persian burial customs performed by the magi, again, kept secret, according to his account. However, he writes that he knows they expose the body of male dead to dogs and birds of prey, then they cover the corpse in wax, and then it is buried. The Achaemenid custom for the dead is recorded in the regions of Bactria, Sogdia, and Hyrcania, but not in Western Iran.

The discovery of ossuaries in both Eastern and Western Iran dating to the 5th and 4th centuries BCE indicate that bones were sometimes isolated, but separation occurring through ritual exposure cannot be assumed: burial mounds, where the bodies were wrapped in wax, have also been discovered. The tombs of the Achaemenid emperors at Naqsh-e Rustam and Pasargadae likewise suggest non-exposure, at least until the bones could be collected. According to legend (incorporated by Ferdowsi into his Shahnameh; lit. 'The Book of Kings'), Zoroaster himself is interred in a tomb at Balkh (in present-day Afghanistan).

The Byzantine historian Agathias has described the Zoroastrian burial of the Sasanian general Mihr-Mihroe: "the attendants of Mermeroes took up his body and removed it to a place outside the city and laid it there as it was, alone and uncovered according to their traditional custom, as refuse for dogs and horrible carrion".

Towers are a much later invention and are first documented in the early 9th century CE. The funerary ritual customs surrounding that practice appear to date to the Sassanid era (3rd–7th CE). They are known in detail from the supplement to the Shayest ne Shayest, the two Rivayat collections, and the two Saddars.

One of the earliest literary descriptions of such a building appears in the late 9th-century Epistles of Manushchihr, where the technical term is astodan, 'ossuary'. Another term that appears in the 9th- to 10th-century texts of Zoroastrian tradition (the so-called "Pahlavi books") is dakhmag; in its earliest usage, it referred to any place for the dead.

== Rationale ==
The doctrinal rationale for exposure is to avoid contact with earth, water, or fire, all three of which are considered sacred in the Zoroastrian religion.

Zoroastrian tradition considers human cadavers and animal corpses (in addition to cut hair and nail parings) to be nasu, i.e. unclean, polluting. Specifically, Nasu the corpse demon (daeva), is believed to rush into the body and contaminate everything it comes into contact with. For this reason, the Vīdēvdād (an ecclesiastical code whose title means, 'given against the demons') has rules for disposing of the dead as safely as possible. Moreover, the Vīdēvdād requires that graves, and raised tombs as well, must be destroyed.

To preclude the pollution of the sacred elements: earth (zām), water (āpas), and fire (ātar), the bodies of the dead are placed at the top of towers and there exposed to the sun and to scavenging birds and necrophagous animals such as wild dogs. Thus, as an early-20th-century Secretary of the Bombay Parsi community explained: "putrefaction with all its concomitant evils ... is most effectually prevented."

== In current times ==
=== Structure and process ===
Modern-day towers, which are fairly uniform in their construction, have an almost flat roof, with the perimeter being slightly higher than the centre. The roof is divided into three concentric rings: the bodies of men are arranged around the outer ring, women in the second ring, and children in the innermost ring. The ritual precinct may be entered only by a special class of pallbearers, called nusessalars, from the Avestan: nasa a salar, consisting of the word elements, -salar ('caretaker') and nasa- ('pollutants').

Once the bones have been bleached by the sun and wind, which can take as long as a year, they are collected in an ossuary pit at the centre of the tower, where—assisted by lime—they gradually disintegrate, and the remaining material, along with rainwater run-off, seeps through multiple coal and sand filters before being eventually washed out to sea.

The precipitous decline in the vulture population in India due to poisoning has led the Parsi community to explore alternatives to standard dakhmas.

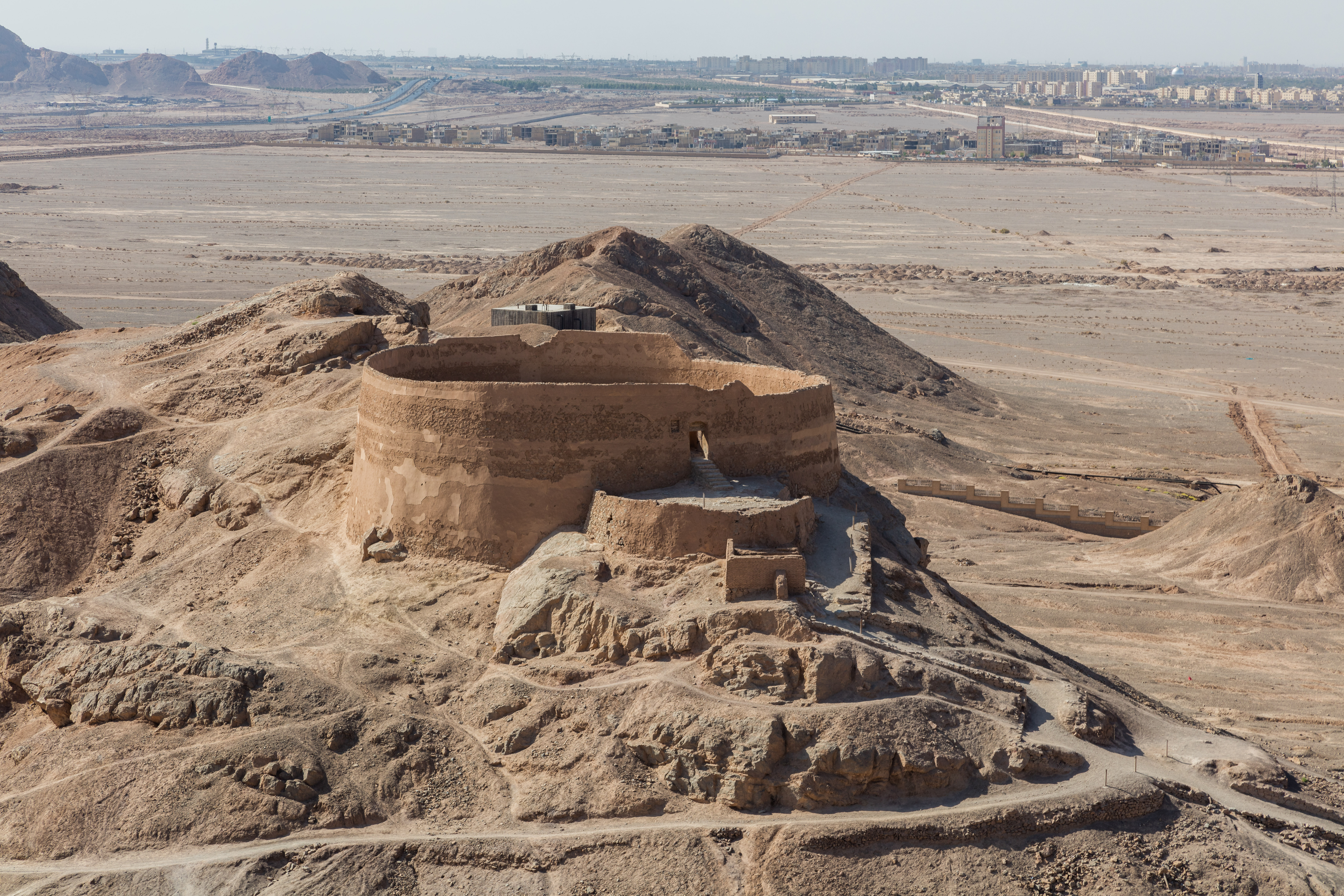
Yazd Tower of Silence, Iran. The building is no longer in use.

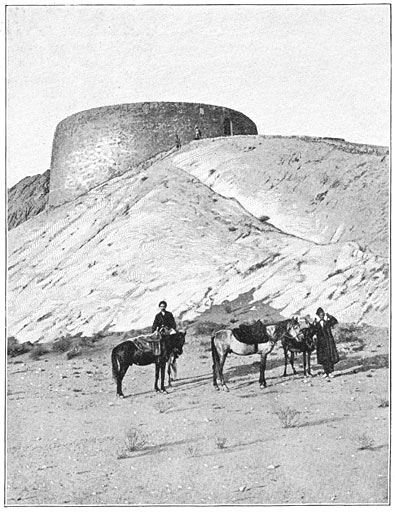
An early 20th century photograph of an Iranian tower of silence

=== Iran ===
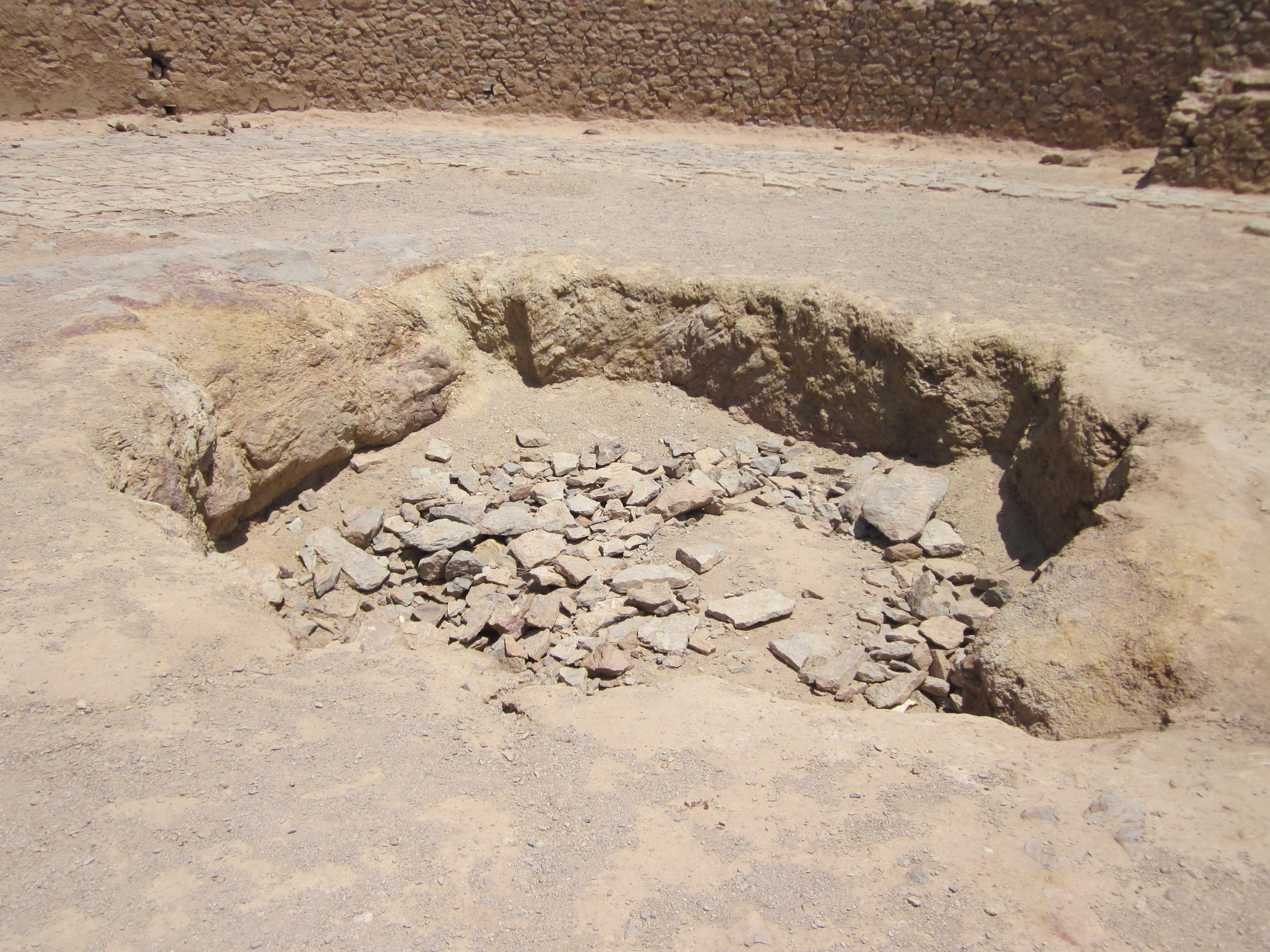
The central pit of the (now-defunct) Yazd Tower of Silence, Iran

In the Iranian Zoroastrian tradition, the towers were built atop hills or low mountains in locations distant from population centres. In the early 20th century, Iranian Zoroastrians gradually discontinued their use and began to favour burial or cremation.

The decision to change the system was accelerated by three considerations: the first problem arose with the establishment of the Dar ul-Funun medical school. Since Islam considers dissection of corpses as an unnecessary form of mutilation, thus forbidding it, there were no corpses for study available through official channels. The towers were repeatedly broken into, much to the dismay of the Zoroastrian community. Secondly, while the towers had been built away from population centres, the growth of the towns led to the towers now being within city limits. Finally, many of the Zoroastrians found the system outdated. Following long negotiations between the anjuman societies of Kerman, and Tehran, the latter gained a majority and established a cemetery some 10 kilometres (6.2 mi) from Tehran at Ghassr-e Firouzeh (Firouzeh's Palace). The graves were lined with rocks and plastered with cement to prevent direct contact with the earth. In Kerman, older orthodox Zoroastrians continued to maintain a tower for a few years after a cemetery was built. Yazdi Zoroastrians continued using the Tower of Silence until the city asked them to close it in 1974.

=== India ===
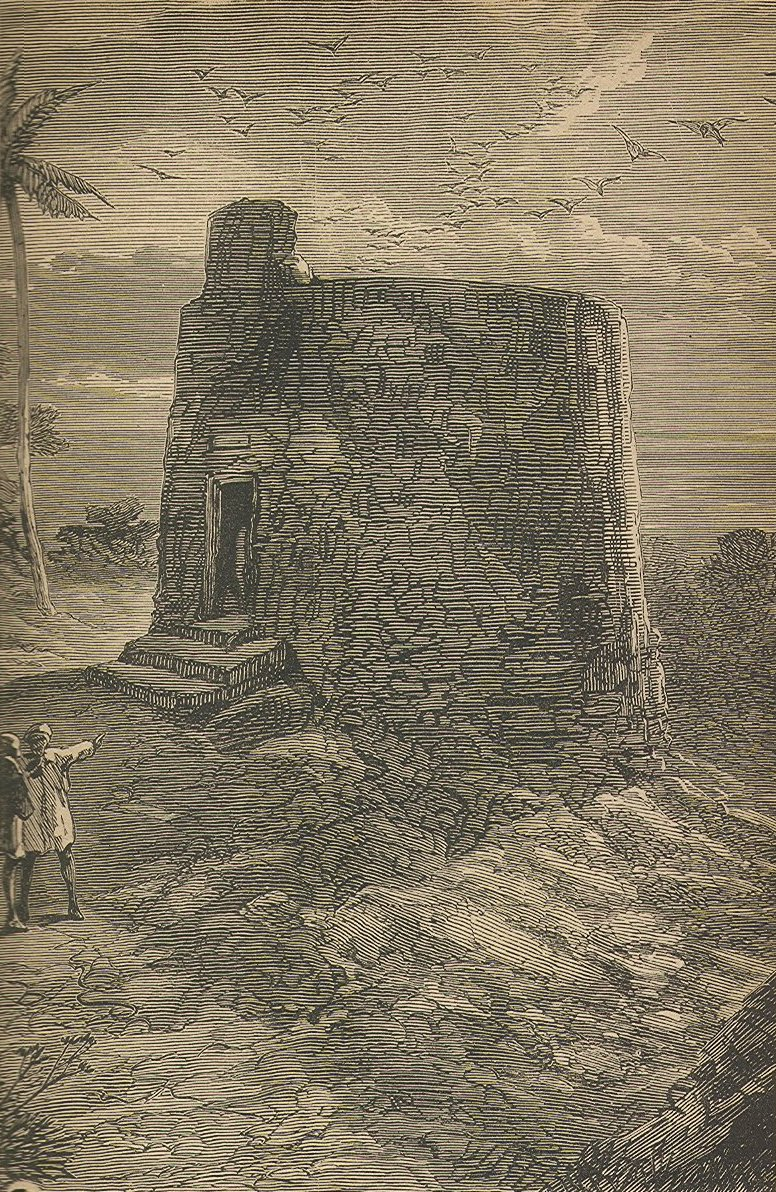
A late-19th-century engraving of a Zoroastrian Tower of Silence in Mumbai (then Bombay)

Following the rapid expansion of the Indian cities, the squat buildings are today in or near population centres, but separated from the metropolitan bustle by gardens or forests. In Parsi Zoroastrian tradition, exposure of the dead is also considered to be an individual's final act of charity, providing the birds with what would otherwise be destroyed.

In the late 20th century and early 21st century, the vulture population on the Indian subcontinent declined by over 97% as of 2008, primarily due to diclofenac poisoning of the birds following the introduction of that drug for livestock in the 1990s, until banned for cattle by the Government of India in 2006. The few surviving birds are often unable to fully consume the bodies. In 2001, Parsi communities in India were evaluating captive breeding of vultures and the use of "solar concentrators" (which are essentially large mirrors) to accelerate decomposition. Some have been forced to resort to burial, as the solar collectors work only in clear weather. Vultures used to dispose of a body in minutes, and no other method has proved fully effective.

The right to use the Towers of Silence is a much-debated issue among the Parsi community. The facilities are usually managed by the anjumans, the predominantly conservative local Zoroastrian associations. These usually consist of a nine-member board, including five priests. In accordance with Indian statutes, these associations have domestic authority over trust properties and have the right to grant or restrict entry and use, with the result that the associations frequently prohibit the use by the offspring of a "mixed marriage", that is, where one parent is a Parsi and the other is not.

The towers remain in use as sacred locations for the Parsi community. Organized tours can be taken to the site. Non-members may not enter the towers; in Mumbai, visitors are shown a model of a tower.

== See also ==
- Burial tree
- Fire temple, Zoroastrian place of worship
- Natural burial
- Seth Modi Hirji Vachha, builder of the first Bombay (Mumbai) dakhma (1672)
- Sky burial
- Vāyu-Vāta, air (vāyu) as a sacred element and the Zoroastrian divinity of wind
