= Tree pod burial =

Method of natural burial

A tree pod burial is a method of burial in which a body or cremated remains are placed in a pod that subsequently serves to nourish a tree planted in the soil above it. It is a form of a natural burial that seeks to reduce the environmental impact of traditional body disposal and create a living landmark to memorialize the decedent.

== History ==
While some cultures have practiced in environmentally friendly burials since ancient times, the recent increase of green, or natural burials began in the United Kingdom in the 1990s. The concept of being buried in a special biodegradable pod with the specific goal of growing a tree originated from Italian company Capsula Mundi in 2003, and a variant of a pod designed for use as an urn containing cremated remains was released for sale in 2016. Similar approaches have also been made available by other companies.

== Process ==
The tree pod burial process is designed to maximize the return of nutrients that make up the human body to the environment. While a full body pod burial is still theoretical, the differences between a full body pod and a pod designed for ashes is similar. In a full body pod, the unenbalmed body is wrapped in a biodegradable plastic or fibers and then placed a biodegradable or biopolymer pod in a fetal position. The pod is then sealed and buried in the earth in a natural burial site. A sapling or larger tree is then planted directly on top of the pod to capture the release of the nutrients. Some companies state an older tree specifically chosen to be suitable for the burial location prior to death is better than a seedling or sapling. An older tree is able to better utilize the nutrients that are released as opposed to younger trees that may not be able to capture them as readily.

A pod designed as a receptacle of cremated ashes would have a similar process to that of a full body pod. The chief difference would be the placement of the ashes instead of a full body. The pod would also have to be designed to decompose slowly so as to not pollute the area or damage the plant life it is designed to nourish. The pH of cremated ashes is extremely alkaline, and also has an increased level of sodium and other nutrient imbalances that is hostile to plant growth. Capsula Mundi state their product is designed to degrade slowly over time so the remains have time to balance and mix with the soil surrounding the pod and not overwhelm the equilibrium of the environment.

== See also ==
- Water cremation
- Human composting
