= Tomb of Haydar Amuli =

- آرامگاه میر حیدر آملی (Persian)
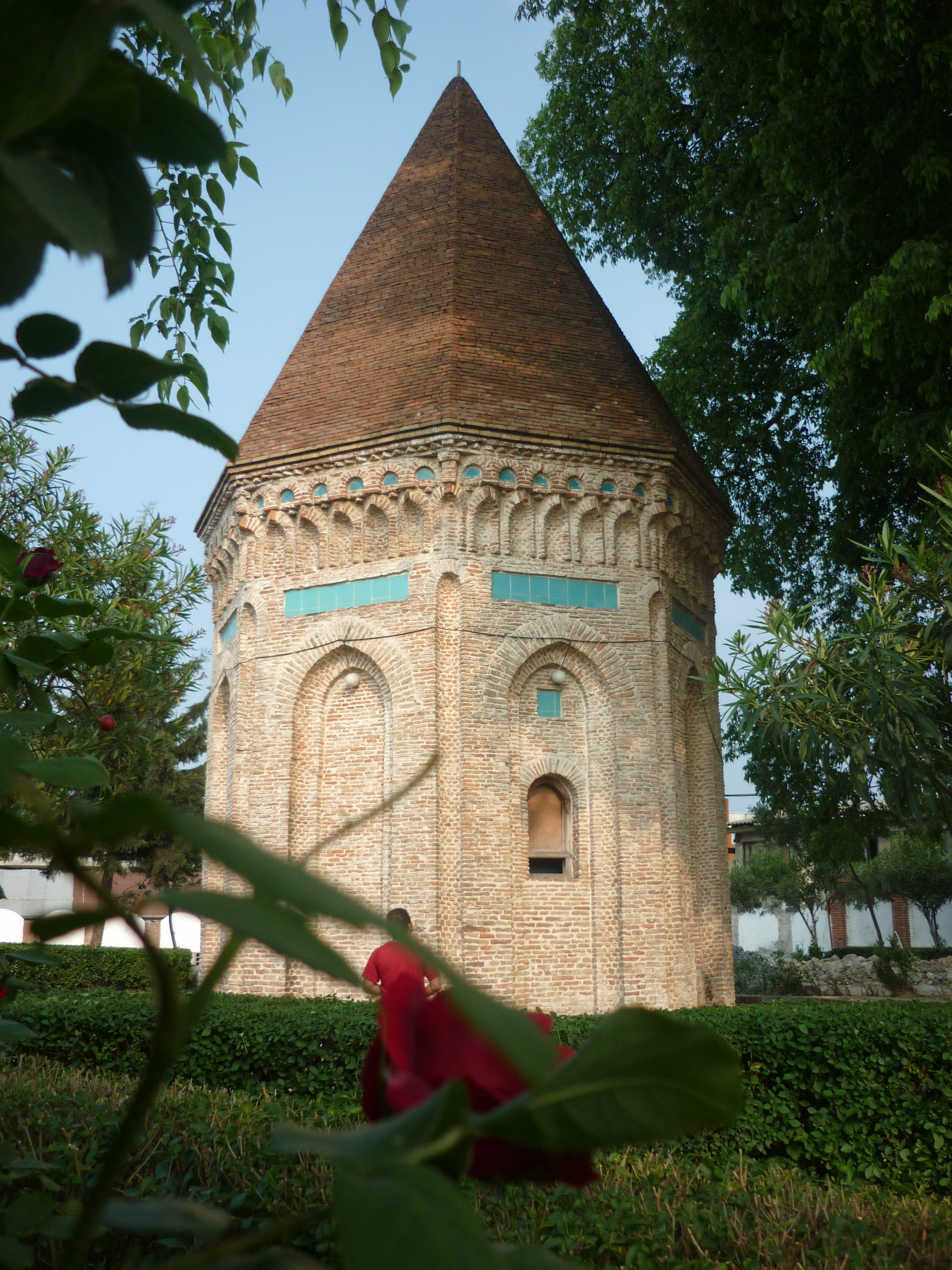
- Tomb of Haydar Amuli

- Location within Iran
- Type: Mausoleum - Tomb Tower
- Location: Amol, Iran

History
- Built: 6th century AD

Iran National Heritage List
- Official name: Tomb of Mir Haydar
- Type: Funerary Tower
- Designated: 1932
- Reference no.: 61
- Conservation organization: Cultural Heritage, Handicrafts and Tourism Organization of Iran

The Tomb of Haydar Amuli or Mir Heydar Amoli Tomb Tower and Monument Seyyed Se Tan (Persian: آرامگاه میر حیدر آملی) is the burial place of Haydar Amuli, the Iranian Mystic and Philosopher. The mausoleum is located in Amol, Iran. Tomb production date, the primary structure was built 6th century AD. The Building brick and octagonal tower and pyramidal dome with height of 12 meters. Two other erudite has been buried here, Izz al-Din Amuli founder mausoleum, himself was a mathematician.

== Gallery ==
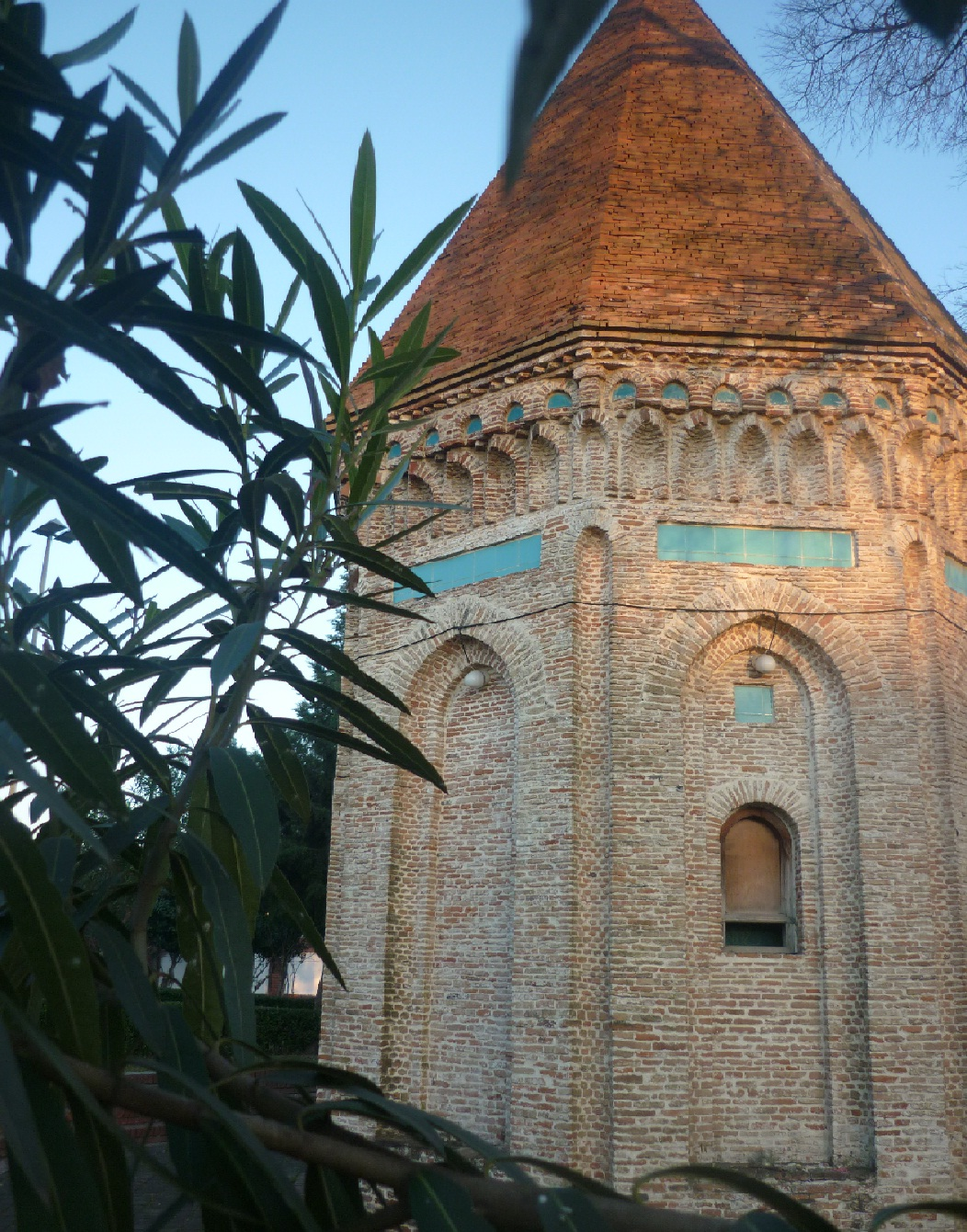
Closely

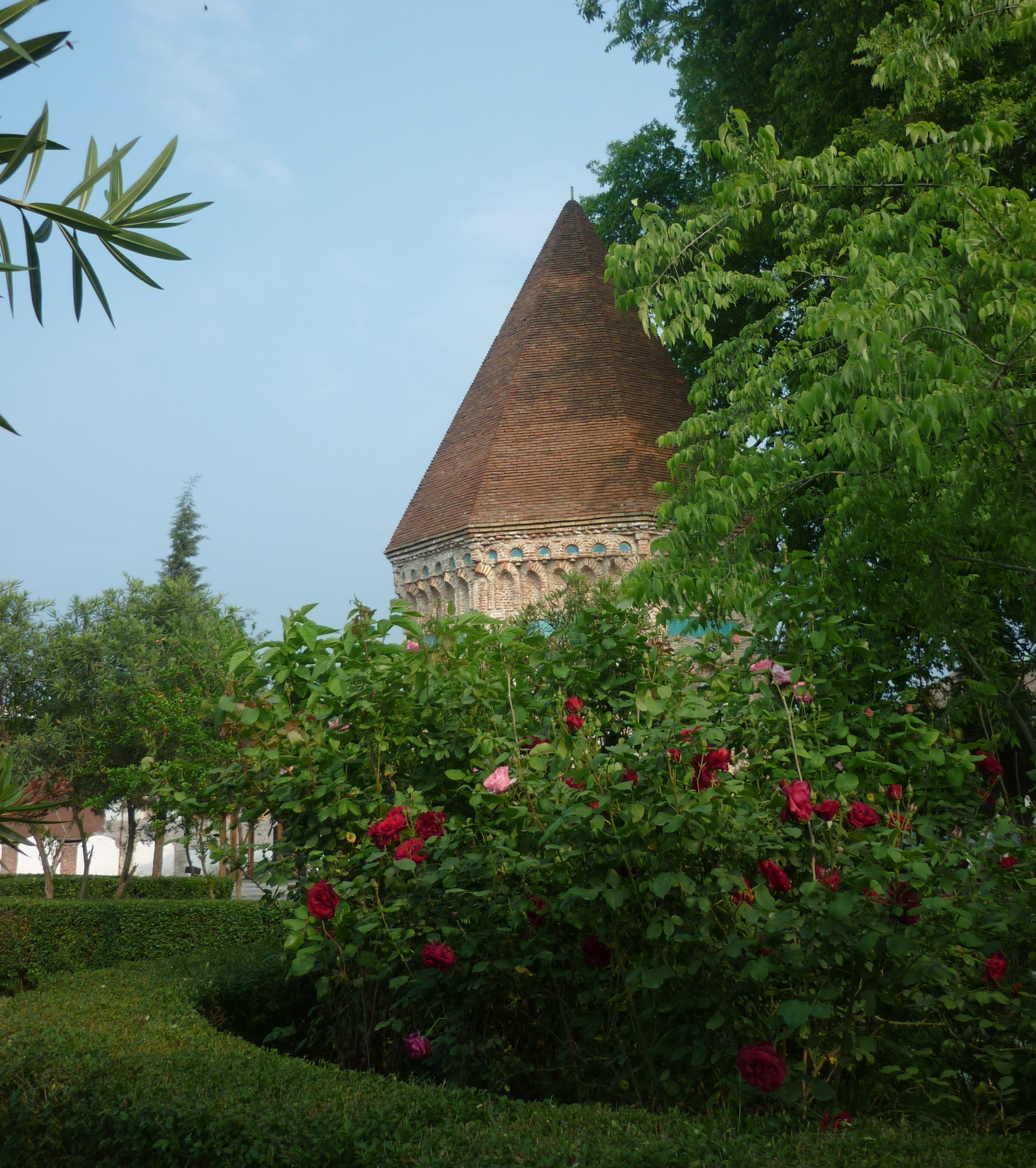
From Behind

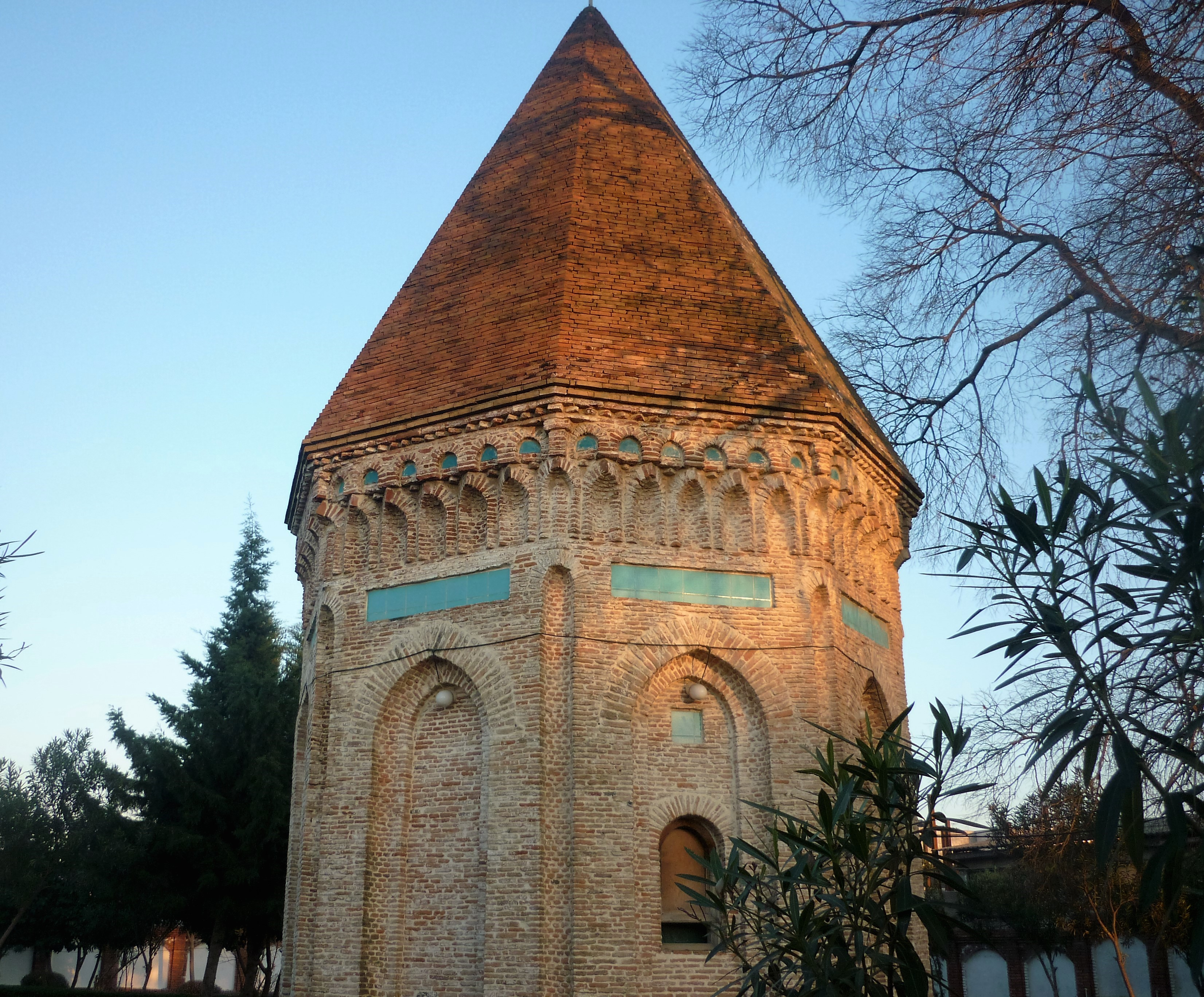
According Overview
