= Radakan Tower (Chenaran County) =

Tower in Iran

Coordinates: 36.7762°N 59.0313°E

- برج رادکان
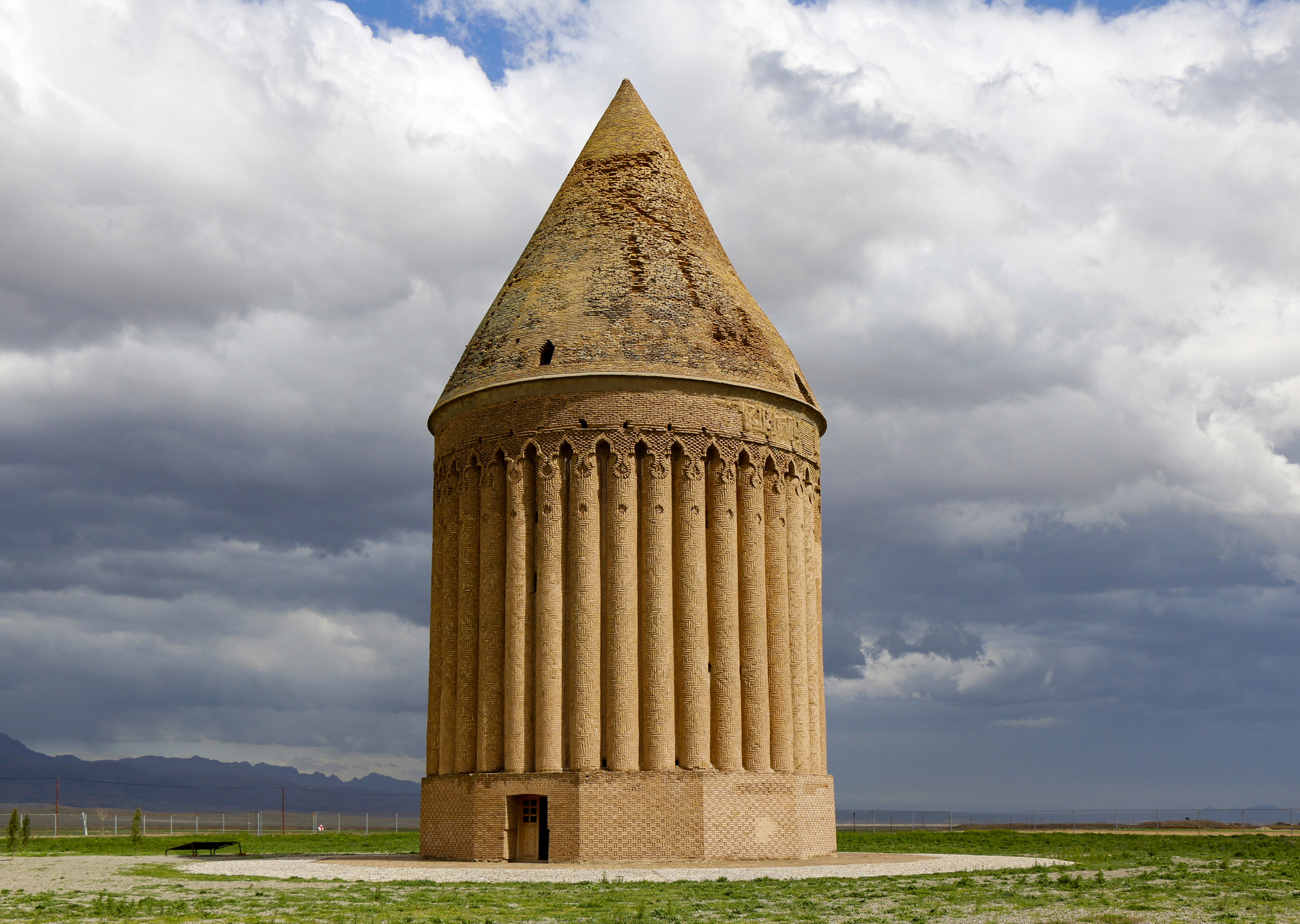

General information
- Country: Iran
- Completed: 1262
- Height: 35 m (115 ft)

Radakan tower (Persian: برج رادکان) is a 13th-century tower near Chenaran in Razavi Khorasan province, Iran.

== History ==
The inscription on the tower indicates that the tower was constructed in year 660 of the Lunar Hijri calendar, roughly equal to 1262 CE. This corresponds with the date of the construction of Maragheh observatory, suggesting that they are related and the tower has had uses in astronomy. The architecture of the tower further confirms this, having a dodecagonal base, corresponding to the 12 months of the year.

Some researchers, such as André Godard, have suggested that the building has been a mausoleum, possibly belonging to the Ilkhanate ruler Arghun or to a woman.

It was enlisted among the national heritage sites of Iran with the registration number 146 on 27 December 1931.

== Architecture ==
The bottom 5.2 metres (17 ft) of the 35-metre-tall (115 ft) tower is a dodecagon, above that there are a series of 36 semicircular columns which lead to a conical dome on top.

== Gallery ==
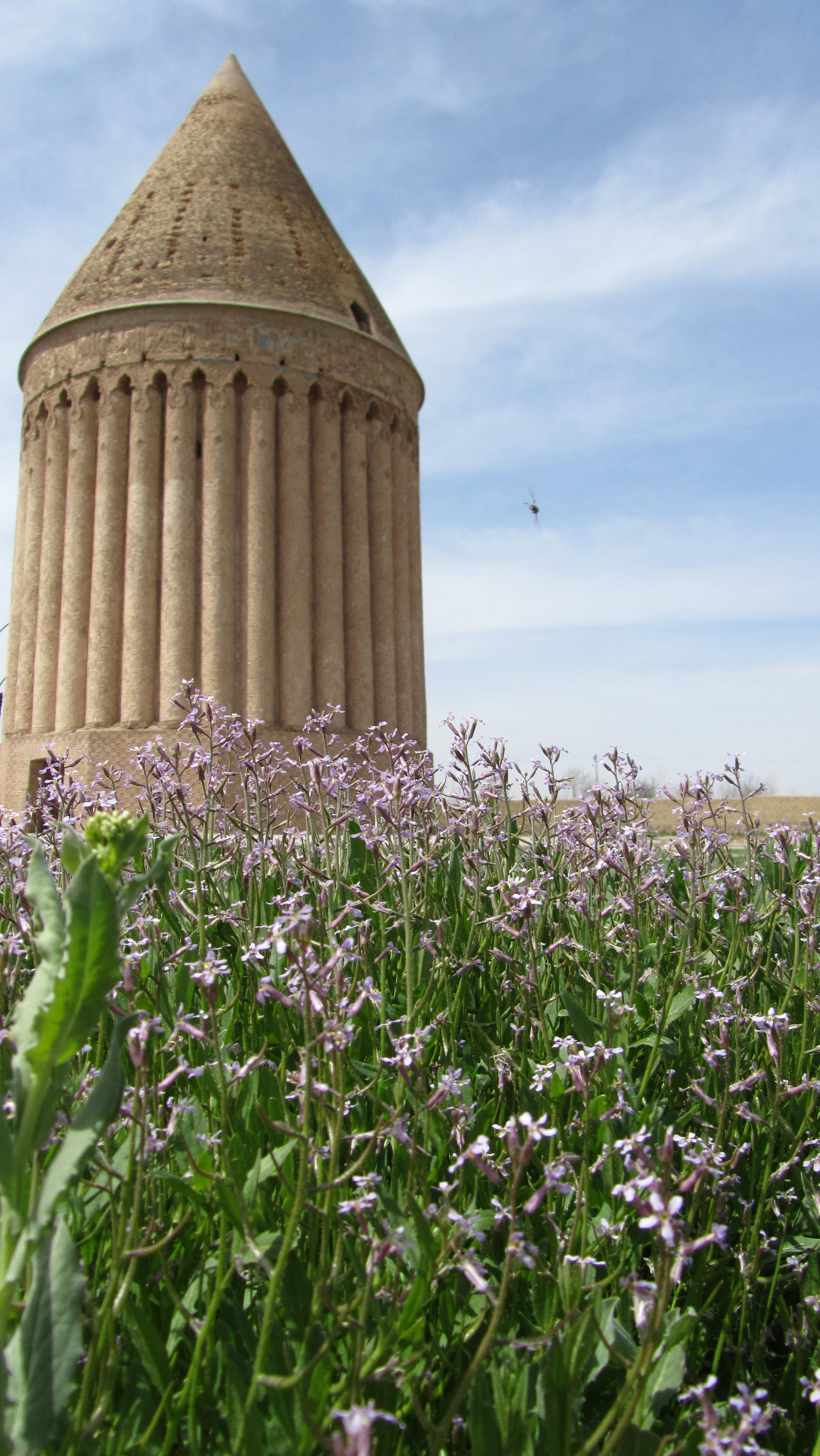

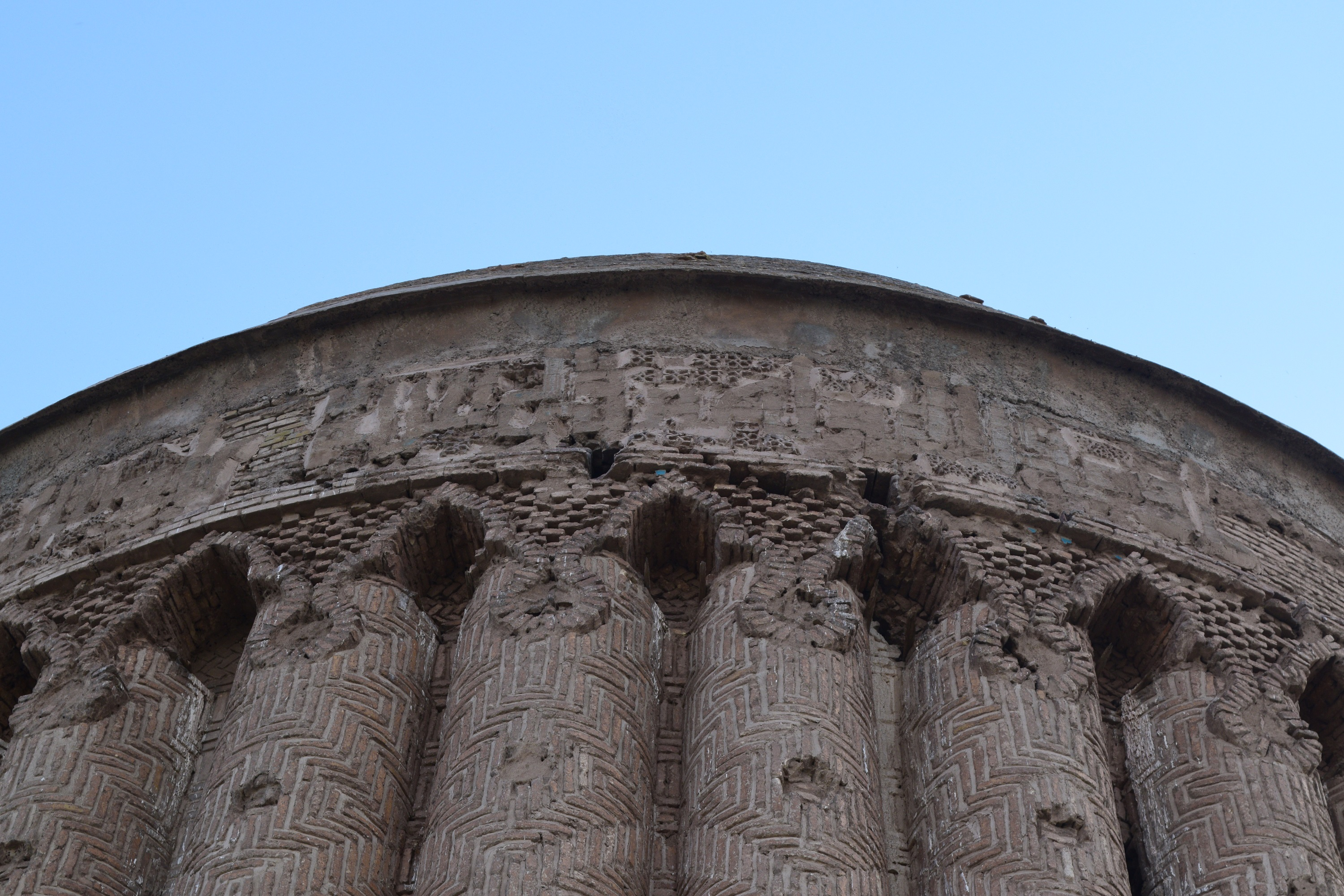

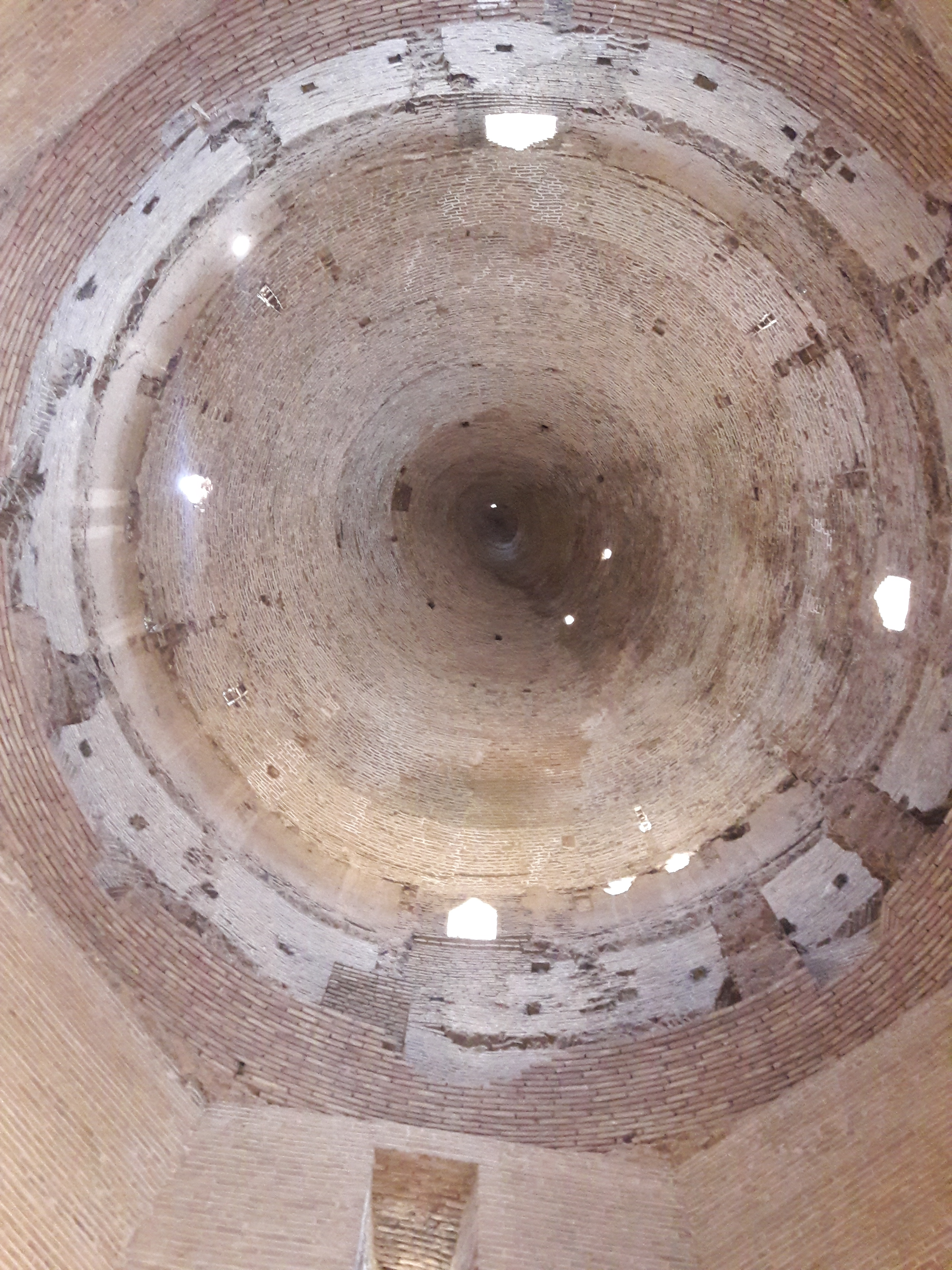

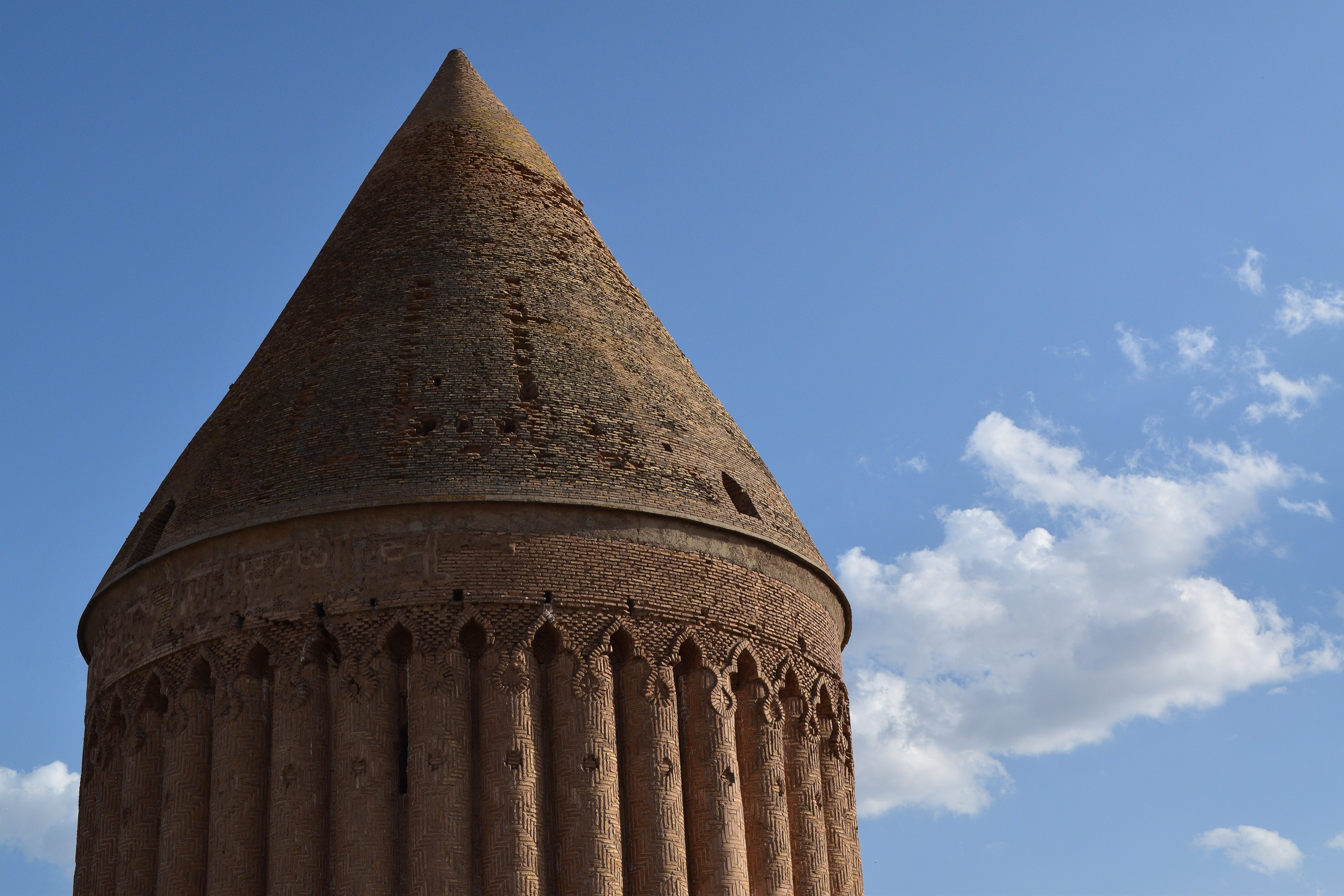

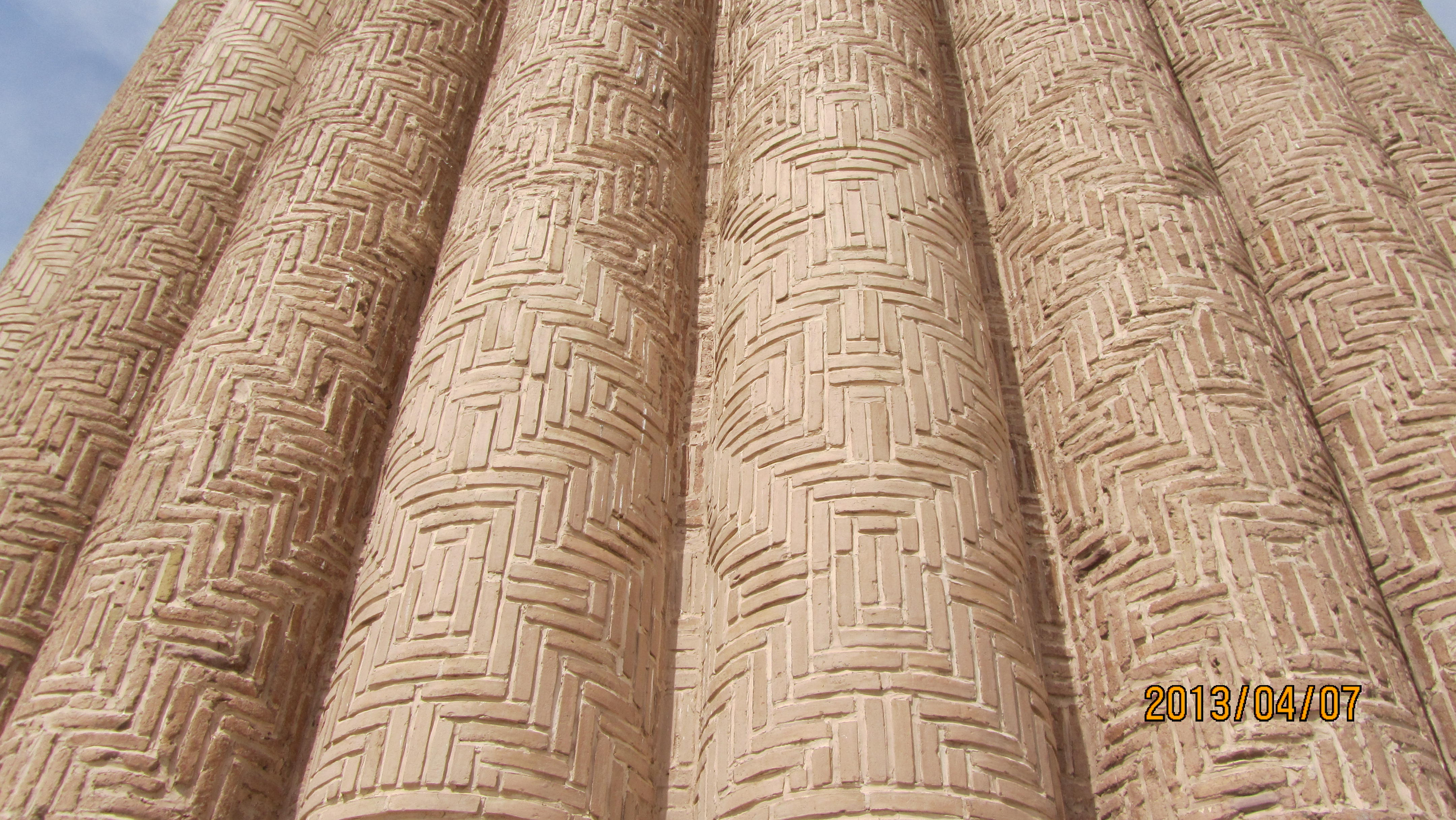

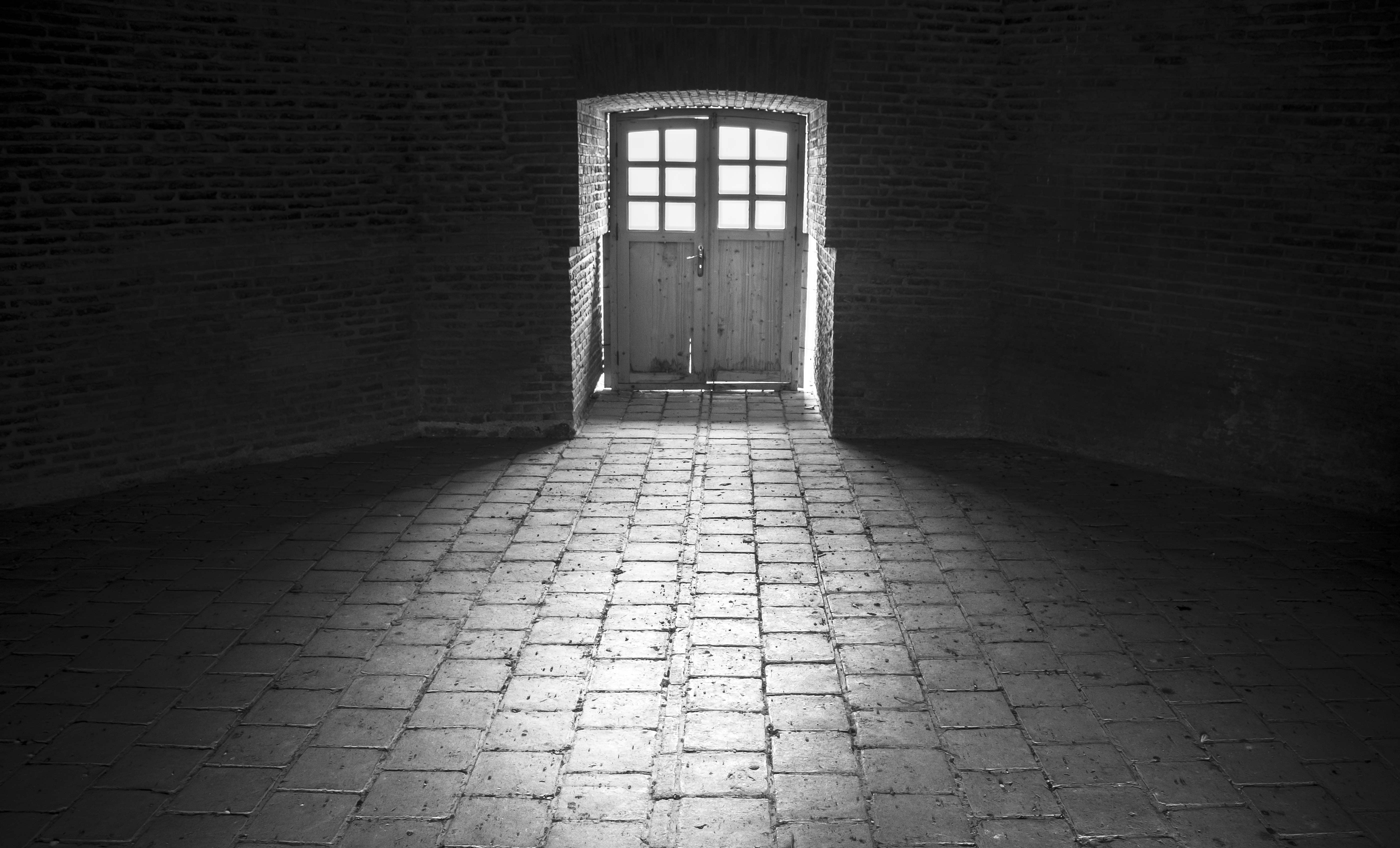

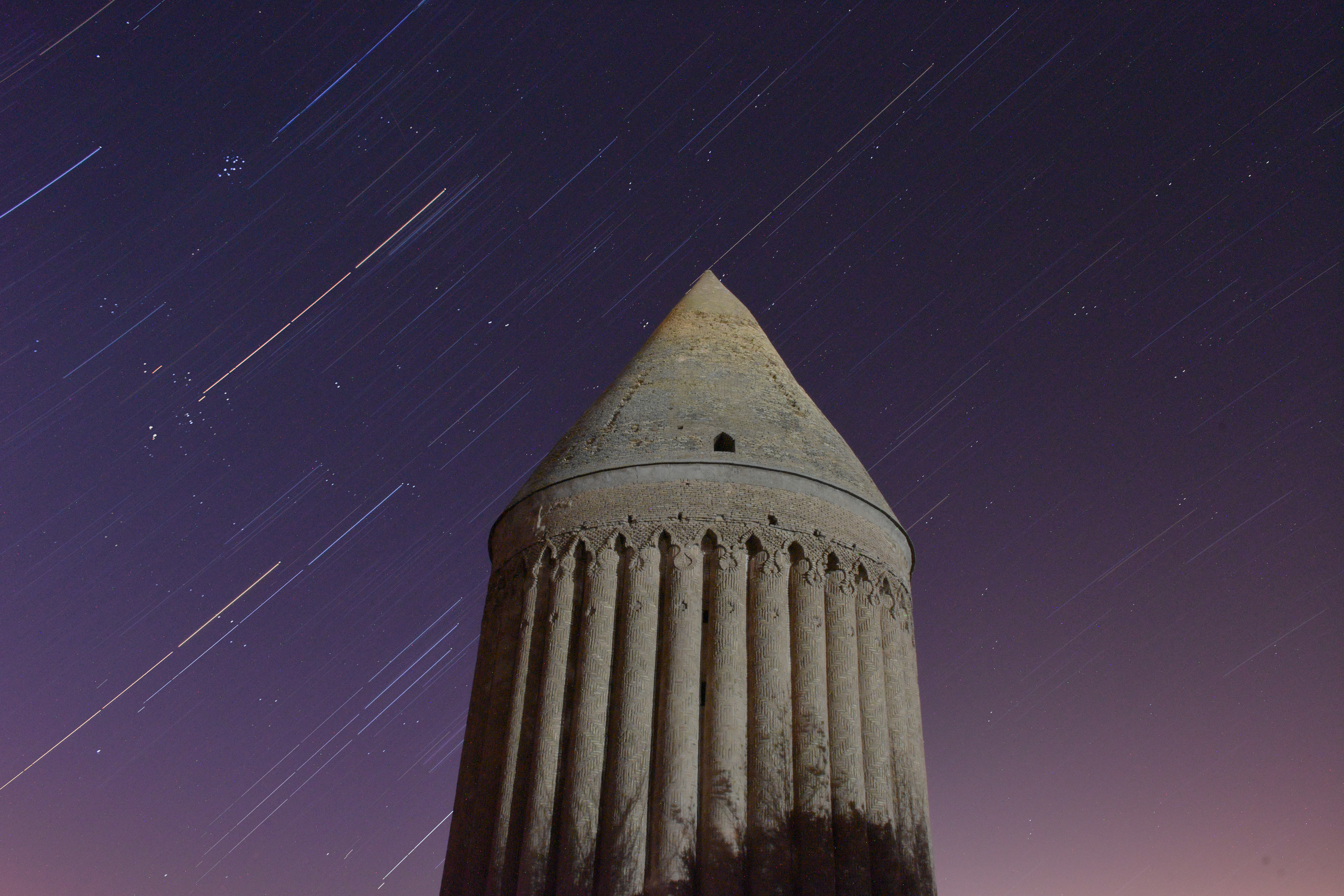
