= Resket Tower =

Historic monument in Sari, Iran

Resket Tower برج رسکت
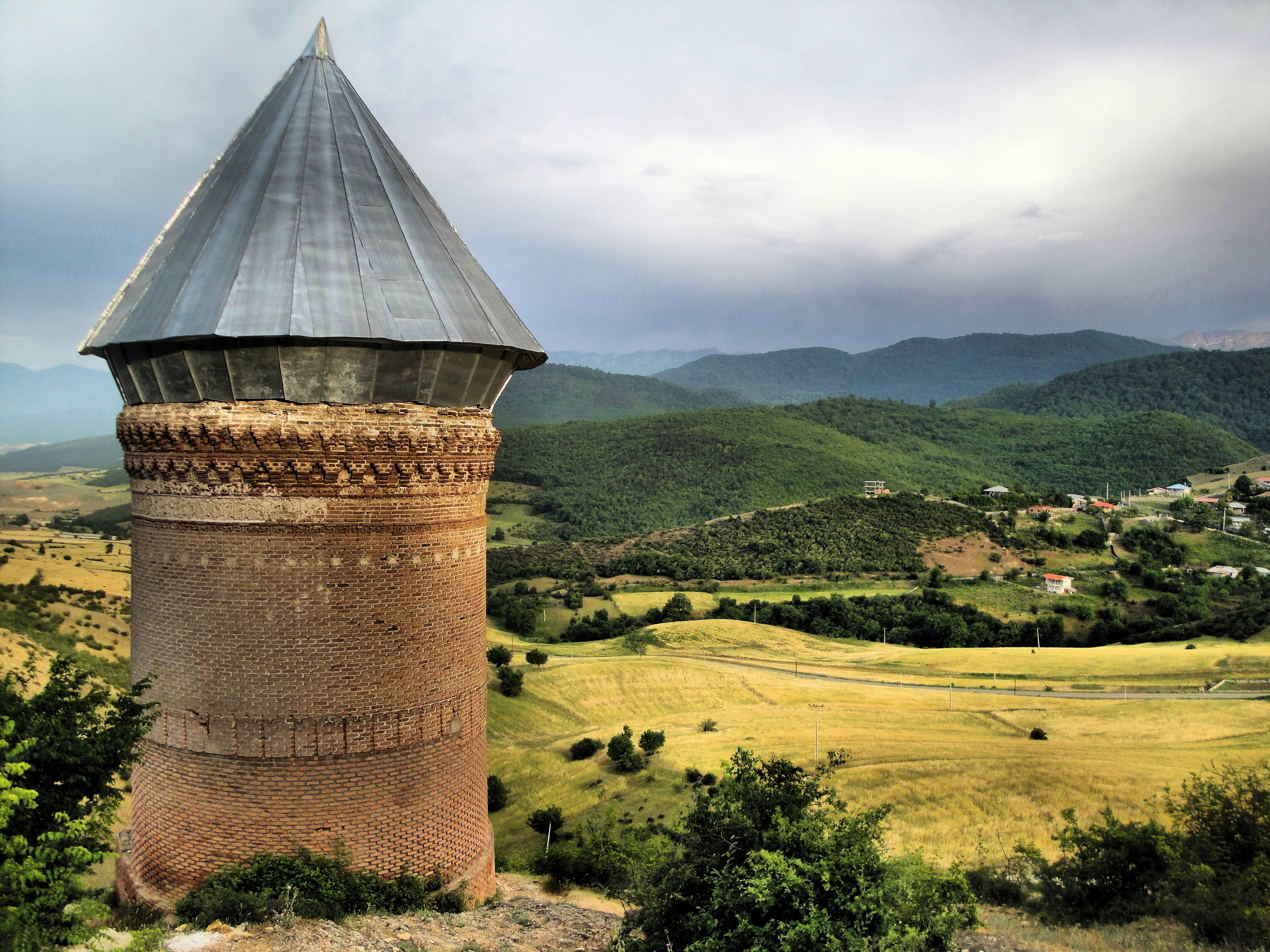

- Location within Iran
- 36°10′1.4″N 53°11′30.7″E
- Location: Resket, Sari, Mazandaran province, Iran

Iran National Heritage List
- Official name: Resket Tower
- Type: Funerary Tower
- Designated: 1933
- Reference no.: 193
- Conservation organization: Cultural Heritage, Handicrafts and Tourism Organization of Iran

The Resket Tower (Persian: برج رسکت; also spelled Resget) is a monument in Sari, Iran. The tower was constructed in the 11th-century. A stucco is written on the entrance, in Arabic and Pahlavi, which states that the mausoleum was built for the two Bavandid princes Hormozd-Yar and Qabus-Yar. The person behind the construction of the tower was most likely the father of the two princes.

== Gallery ==
Ceiling

Details

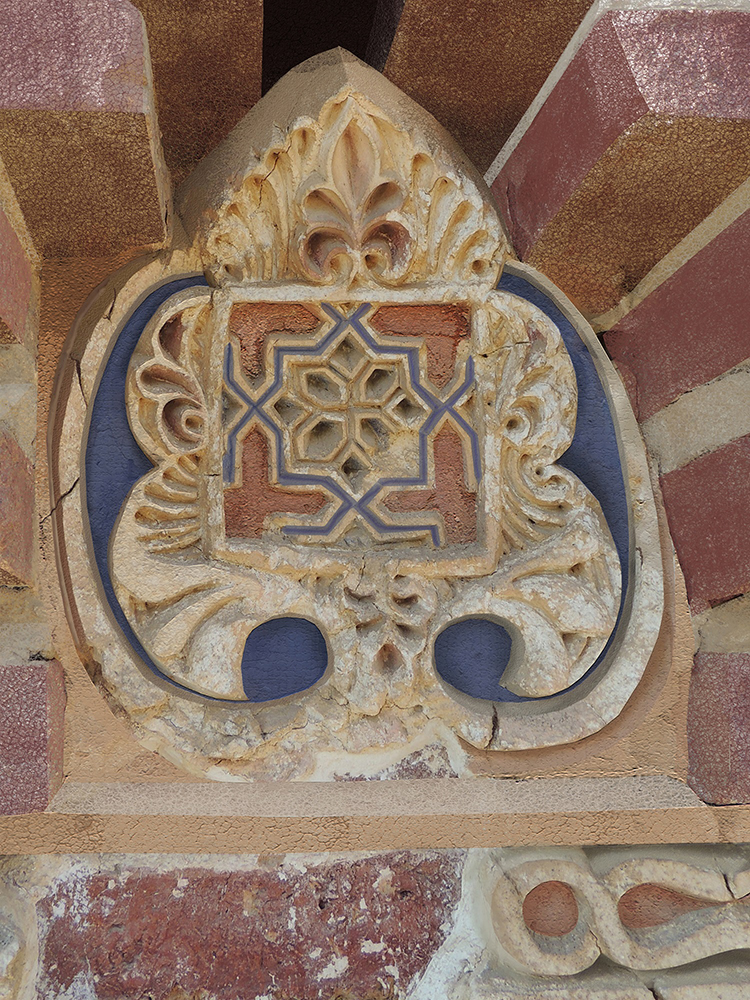
Details

== Sources ==
- Babaie, Sussan; Grigor, Talinn (2015). Persian Kingship and Architecture: Strategies of Power in Iran from the Achaemenids to the Pahlavis. I.B.Tauris. pp. 1–288. ISBN 9780857734778.
