= Tomb of Abdolabad =

Iranian national heritage site

- آرامگاه عبدل‌آباد (Persian)
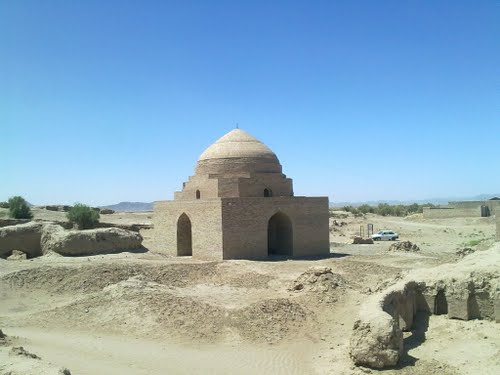
- Interactive map of Tomb of Abdolabad
- 35°05′44″N 57°58′38″E
- Type: Tomb
- Periods: Ilkhanate
- Location: Jolgeh, Shahrabad, Abdolabad, Bardaskan, Razavi Khorasan, Iran

The Tomb of Abdolabad (Persian: آرامگاه عبدل‌آباد) is a historic tomb and chahartaqi of the Ilkhanid era in Abdolabad village, Razavi Khorasan province, Iran. The tomb was added to the Iran National Heritage List as the 10,908th monument.

== Gallery ==
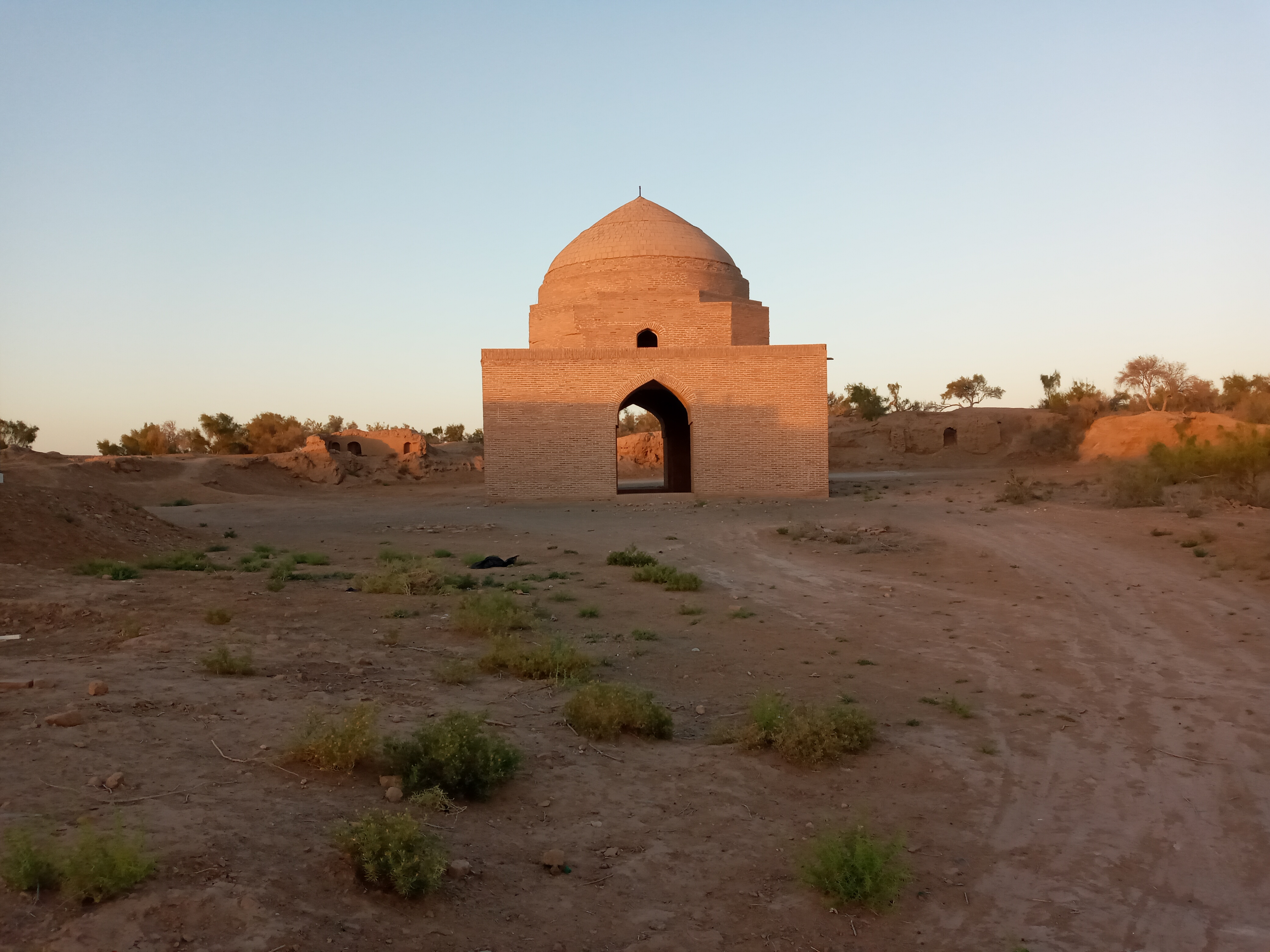
Abdolabad Mosque

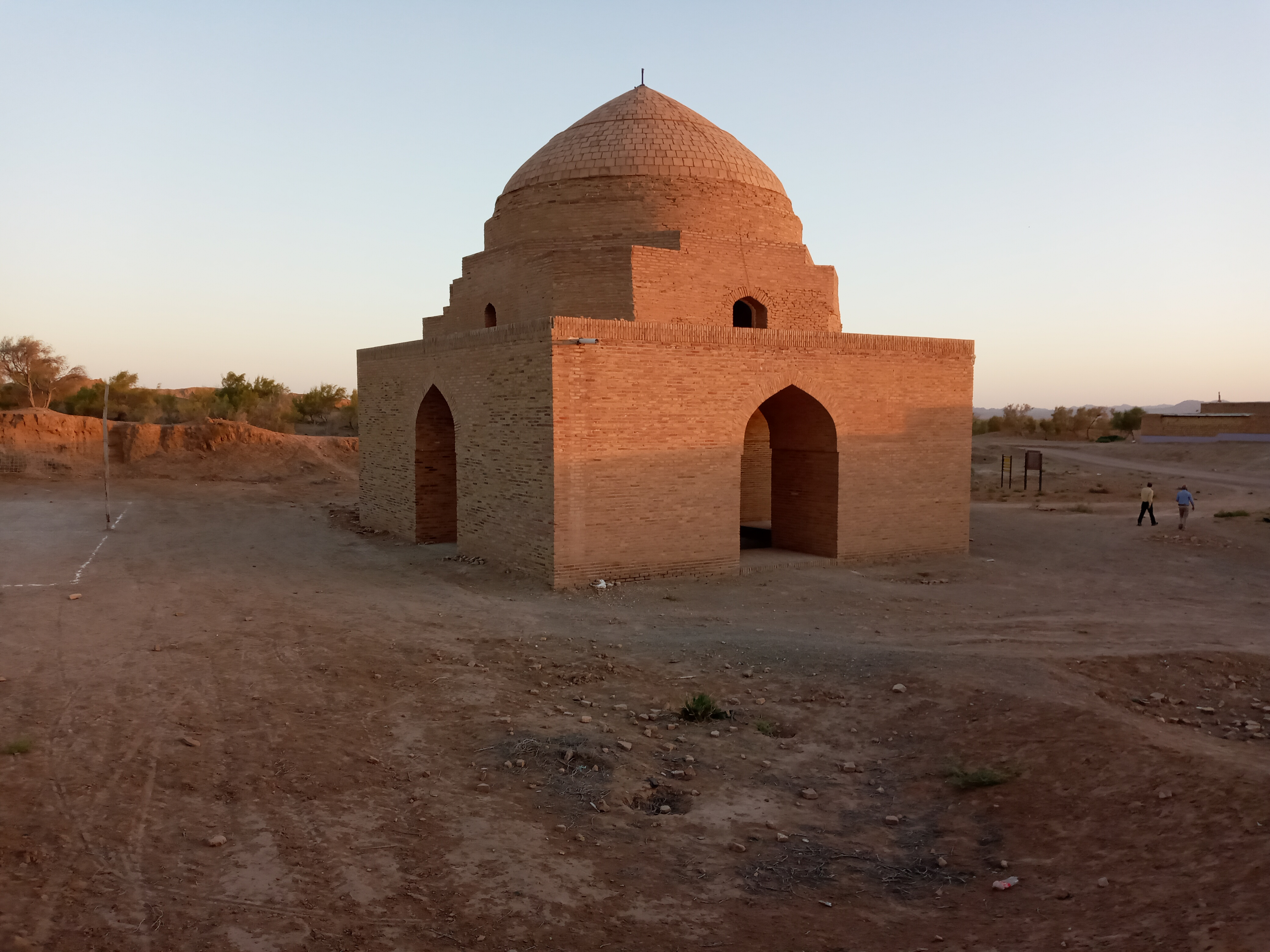
Abdolabad Mosque

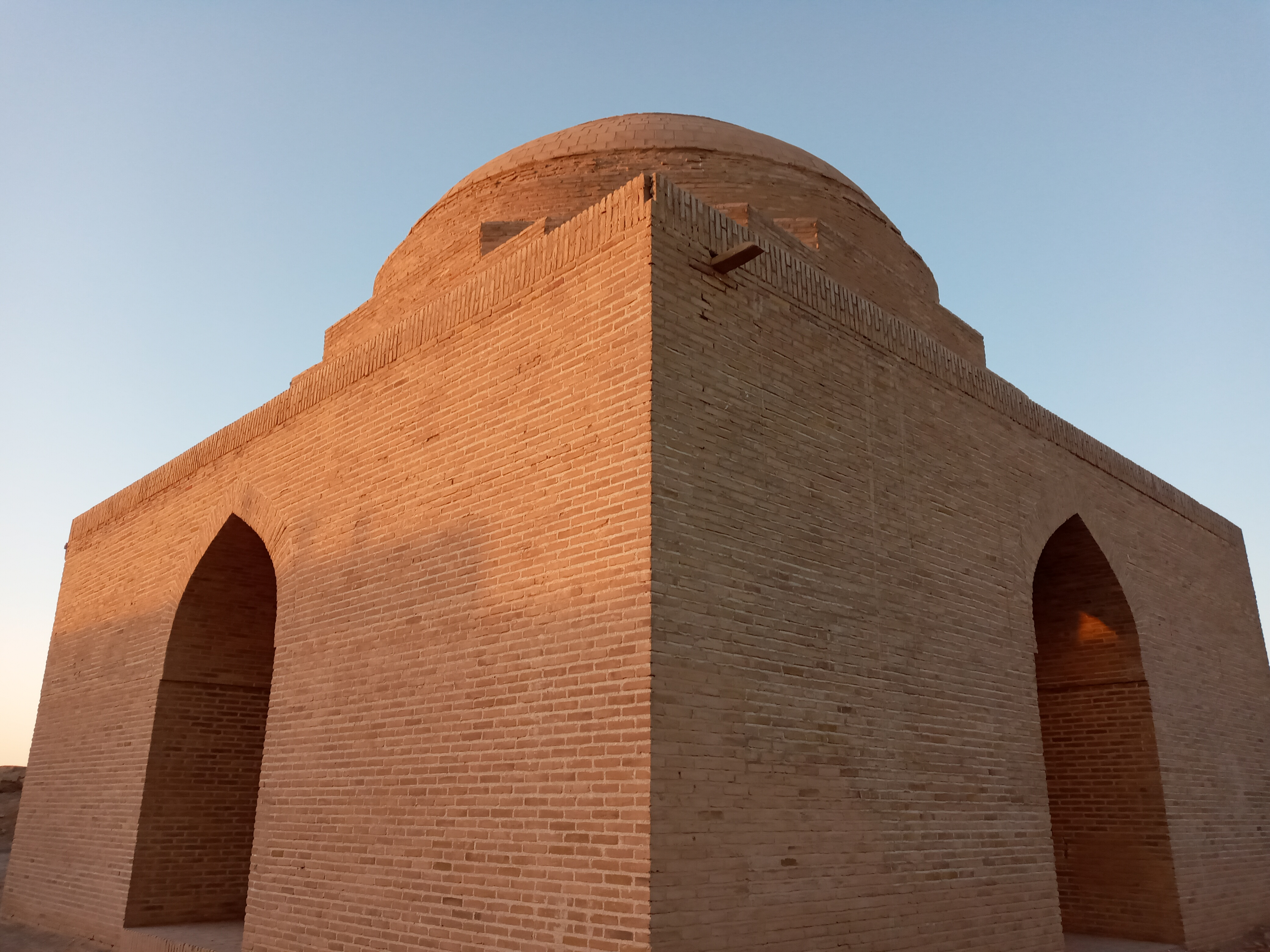
Exterior view

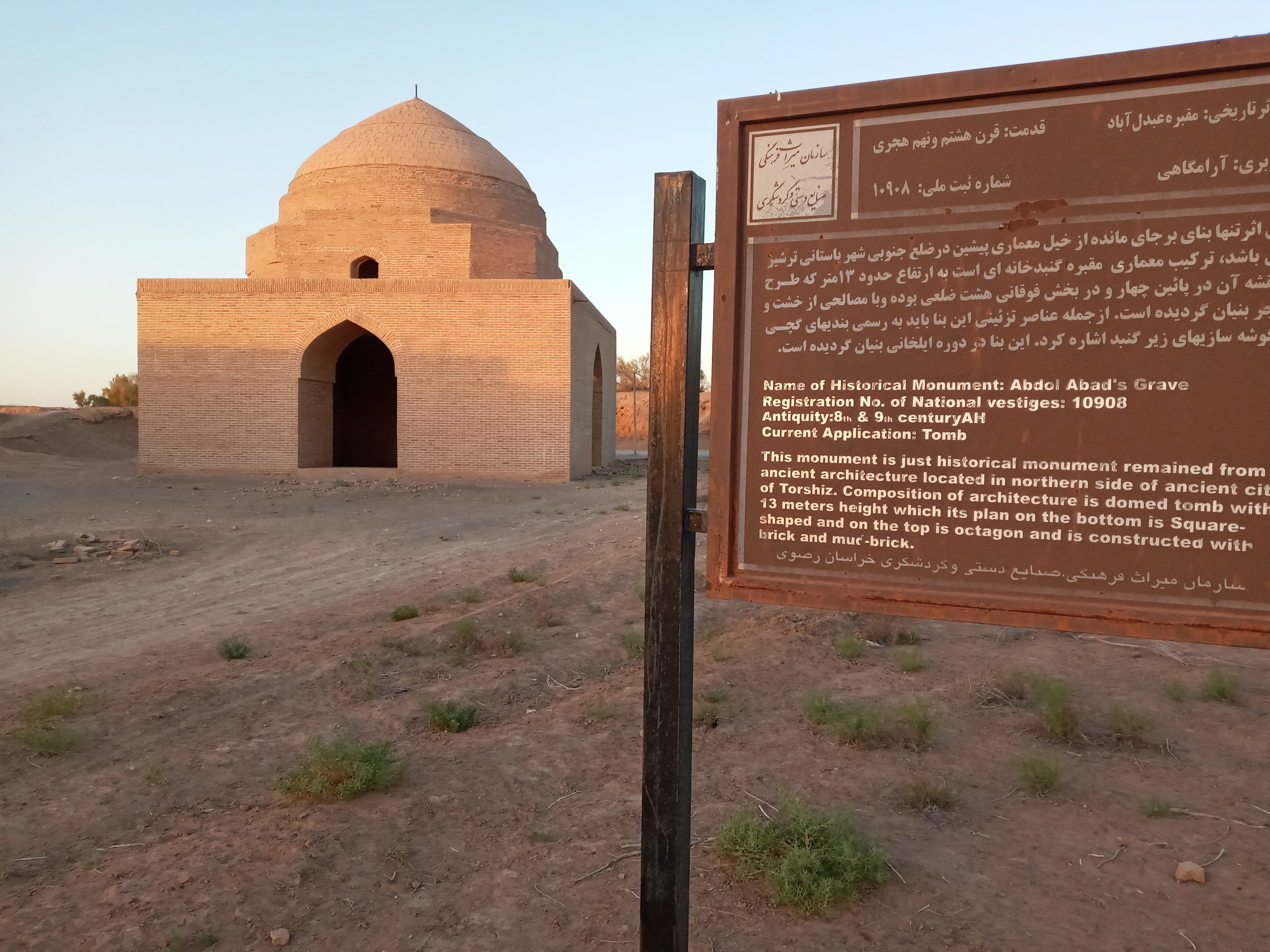
Mosque with description board

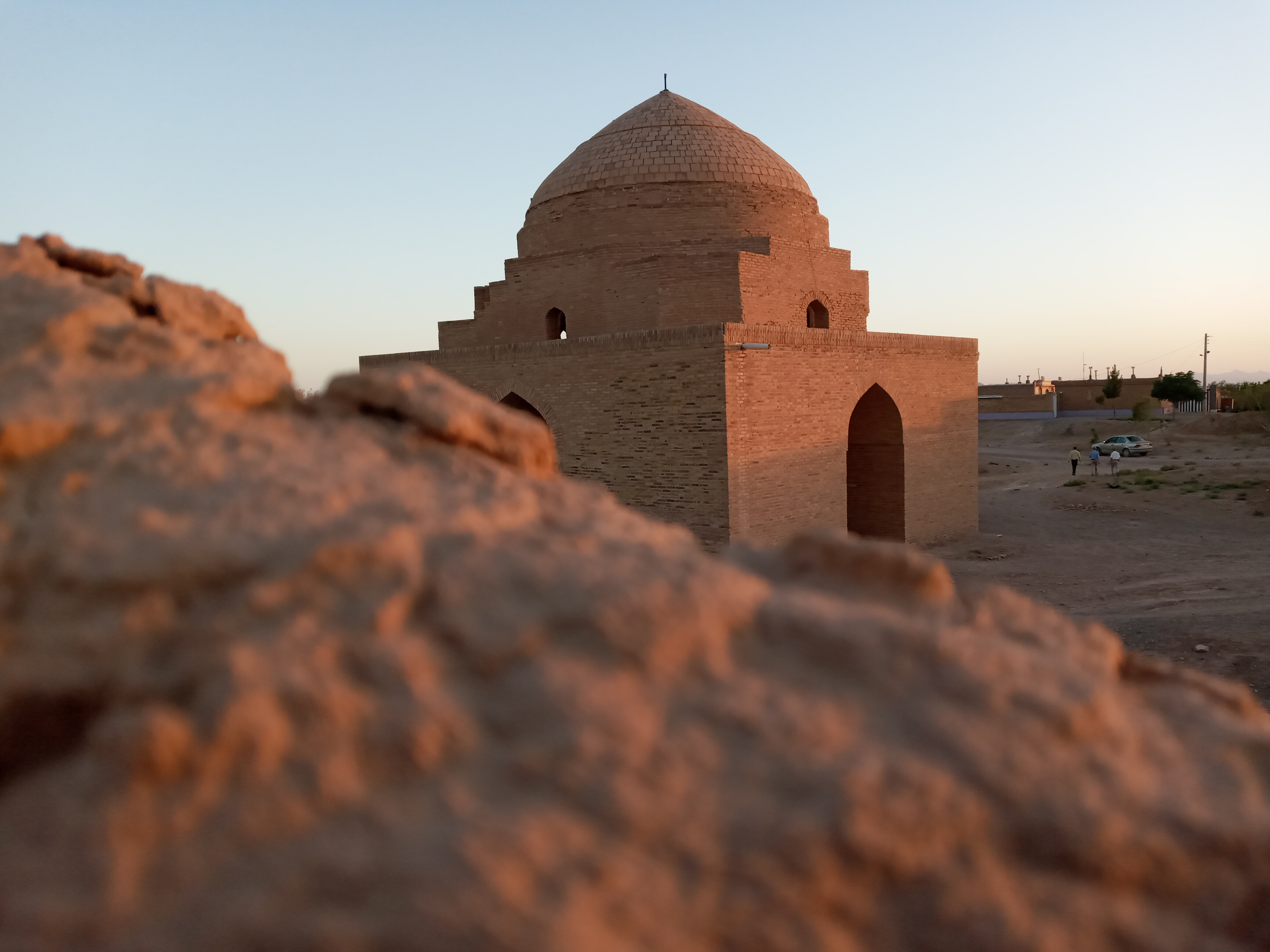
A far view of the mosque

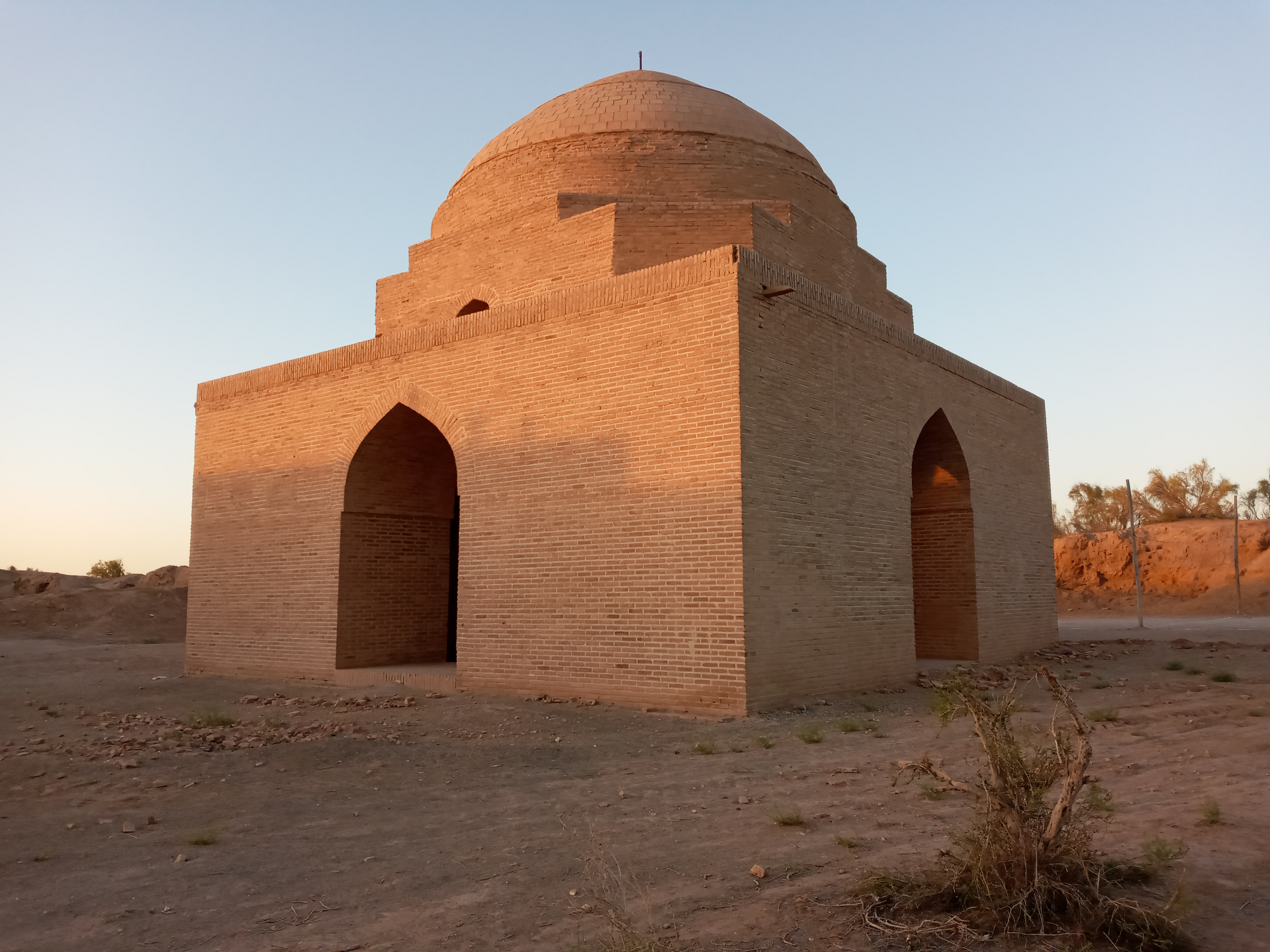
Abdolabad Mosque

== See also ==
- Aliabad Tower
- Cultural Heritage, Handcrafts and Tourism Organization
- Firuzabad Tower
- Seyyed Bagher Ab anbar
