= Firuzabad Tower =

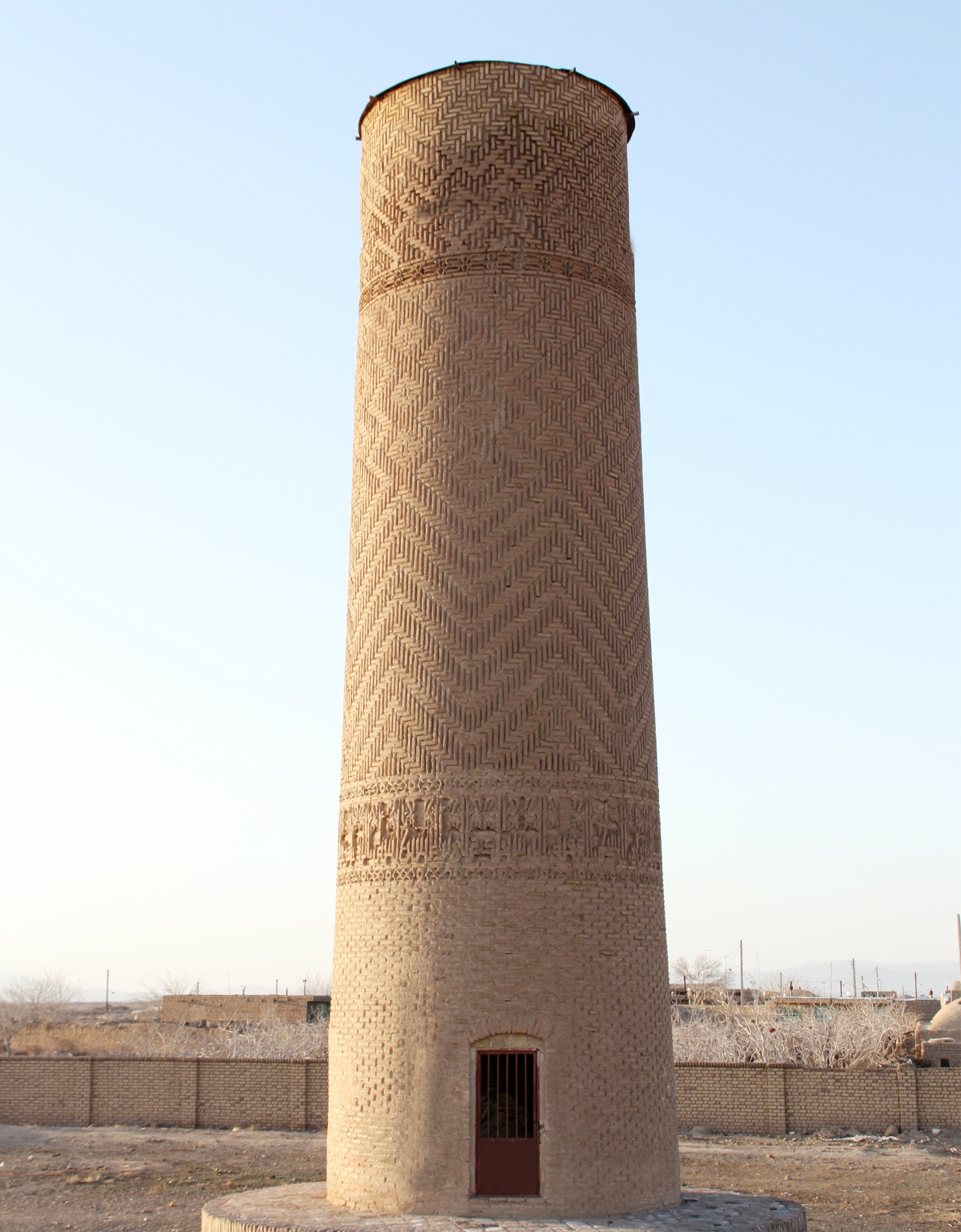

- Location within Iran
- 35°07′34″N 57°57′11″E
- Location: Firuzabad, Jolgeh, Shahrabad, Bardaskan, Razavi Khorasan

Site notes
- Height: 18 metres (59 ft)

Iran National Heritage List
- Official name: Firuzabad Tower
- Type: Tower
- Designated: 1932
- Reference no.: 91
- Conservation organization: Cultural Heritage, Handicrafts and Tourism Organization of Iran

The Firuzabad Tower (Persian: برج فیروزآباد) is a grave historical tower of the Great Seljuq Empire era that is located 17 km south of Bardaskan in Firuzabad village at Shahrabad District on old Torshiz. Archaeological evidence confirms the habitat of Islam until the seventh century AH, which is around the province and shining star of the eighth Imam of Appreciation through Ali ar-Ridha of this was the route. Cylindrical shape with an outward current height of the minarets and 18 meters with decorative elements and architectural style reflects the bricklayer is a mystery. The tower was added as the 91st monument to the list of Iran's national monuments.

== Gallery ==
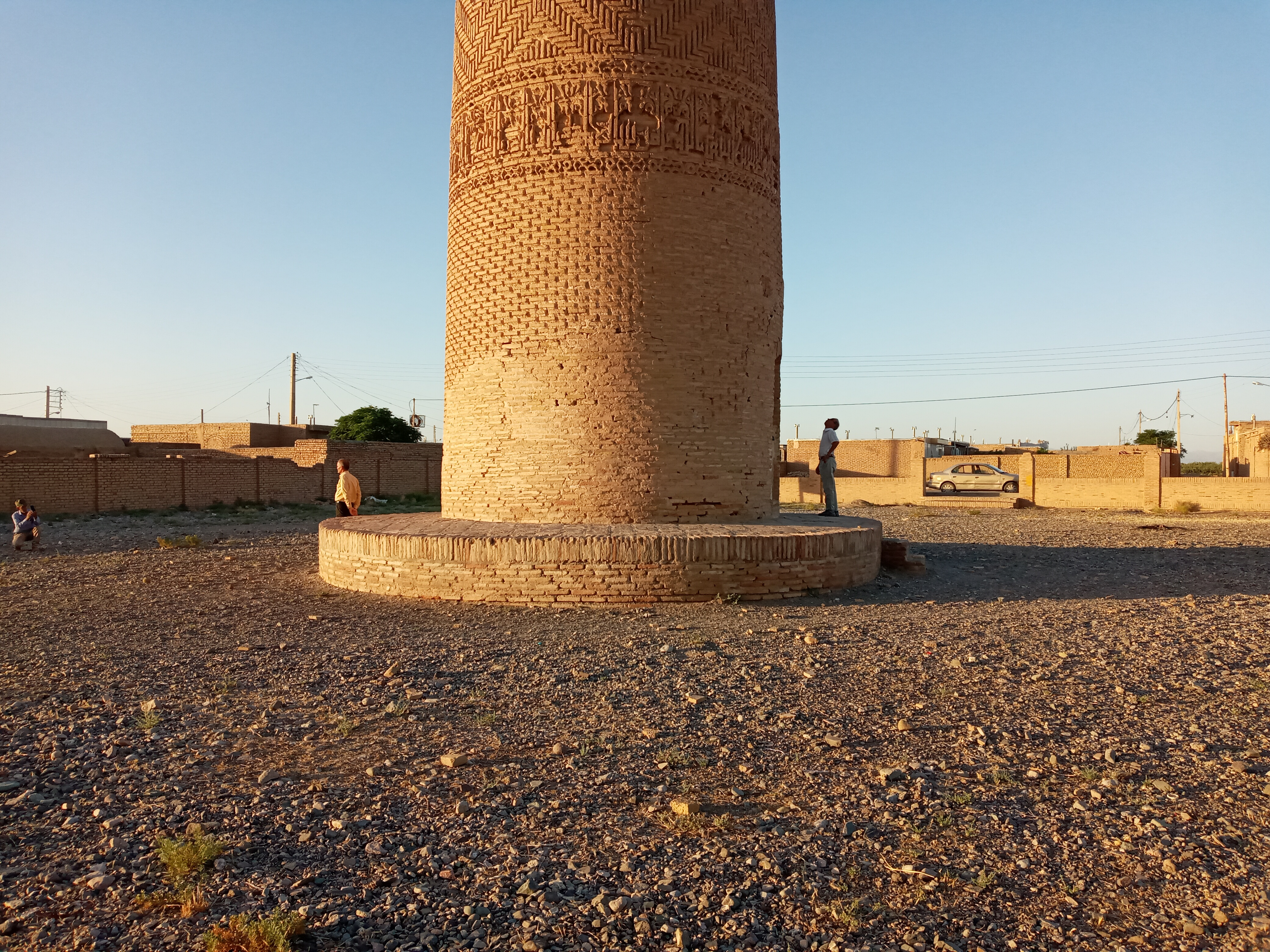
Firuzabad Tower

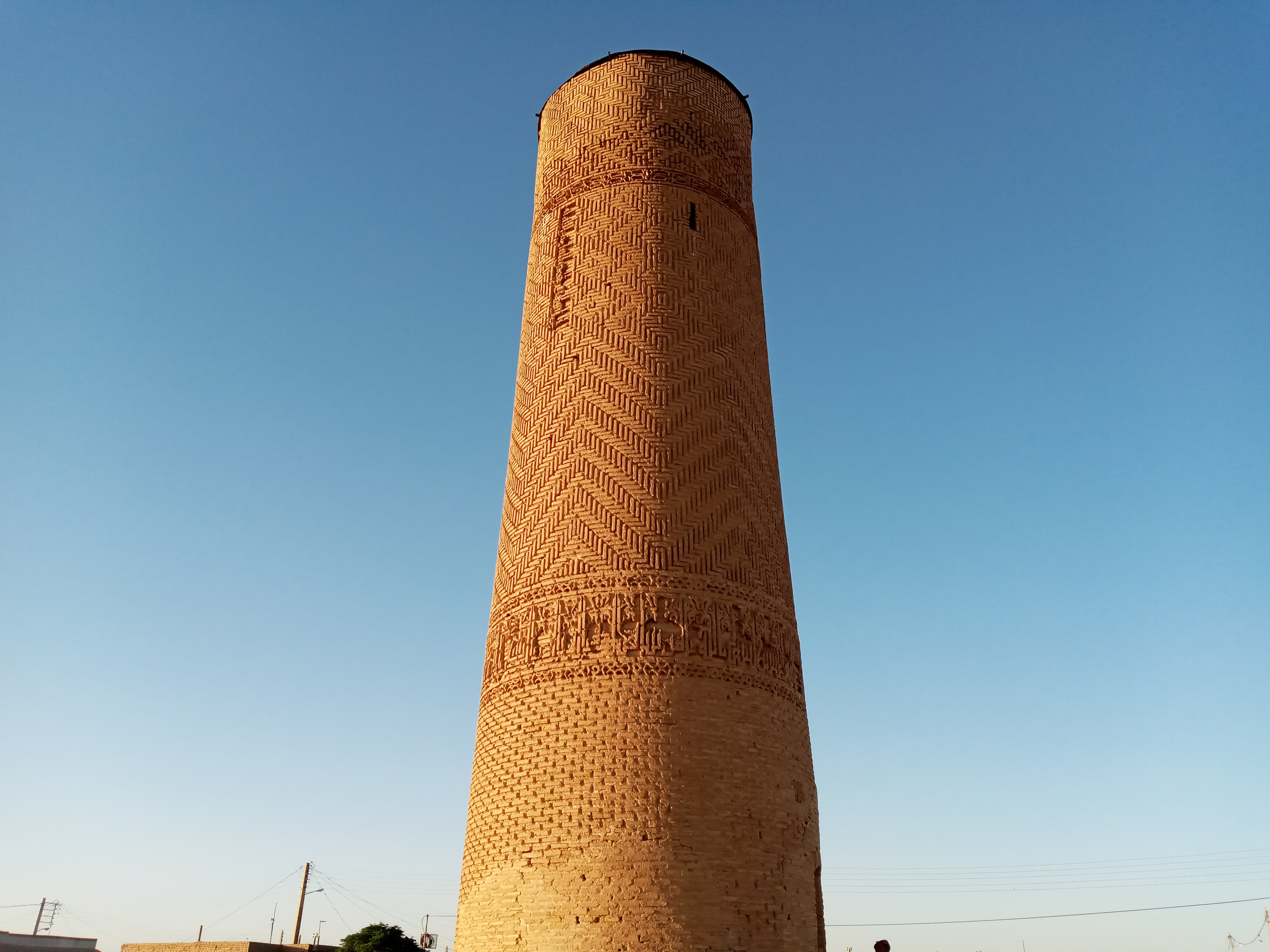
Firuzabad Tower

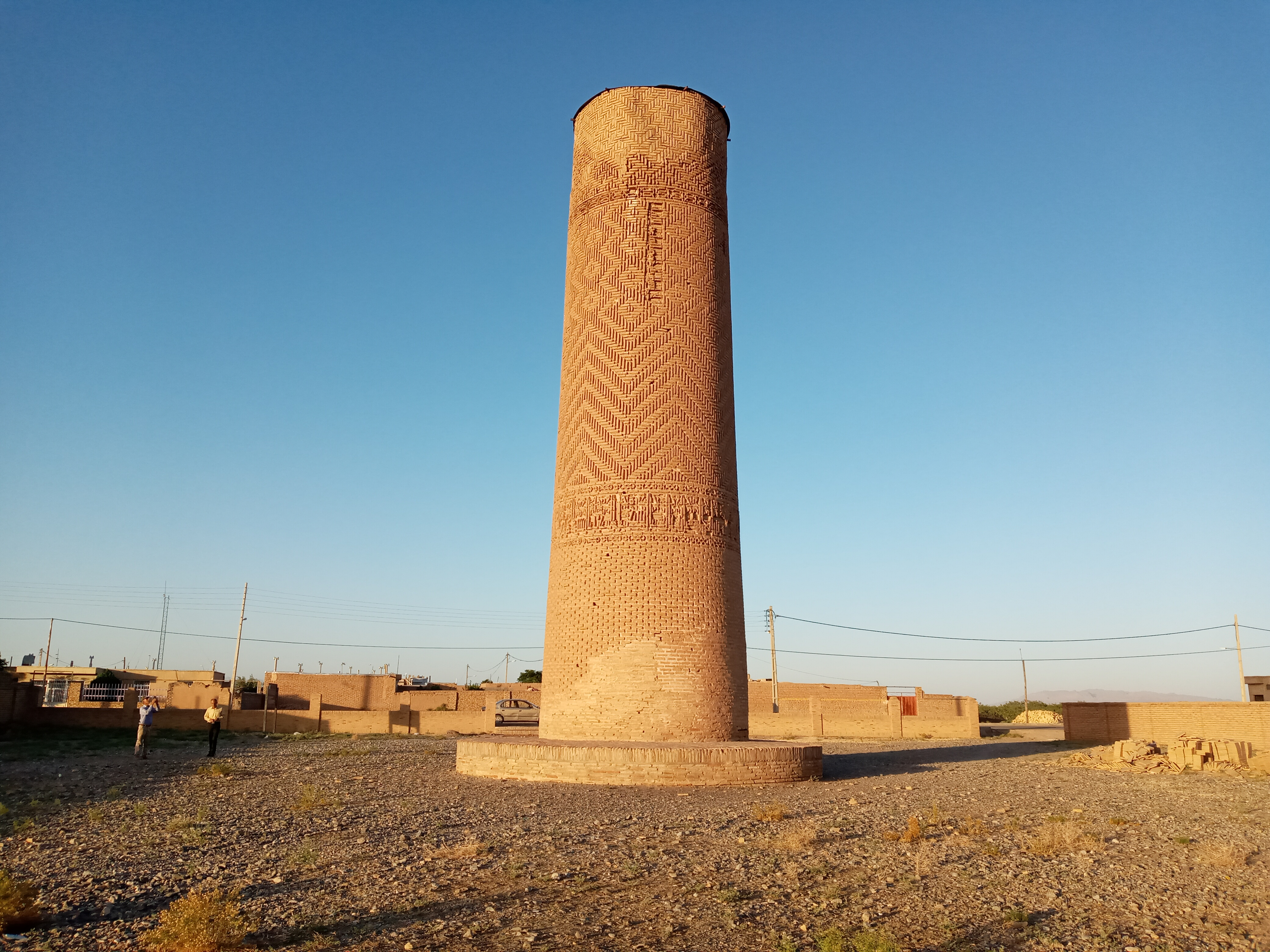
Firuzabad Tower

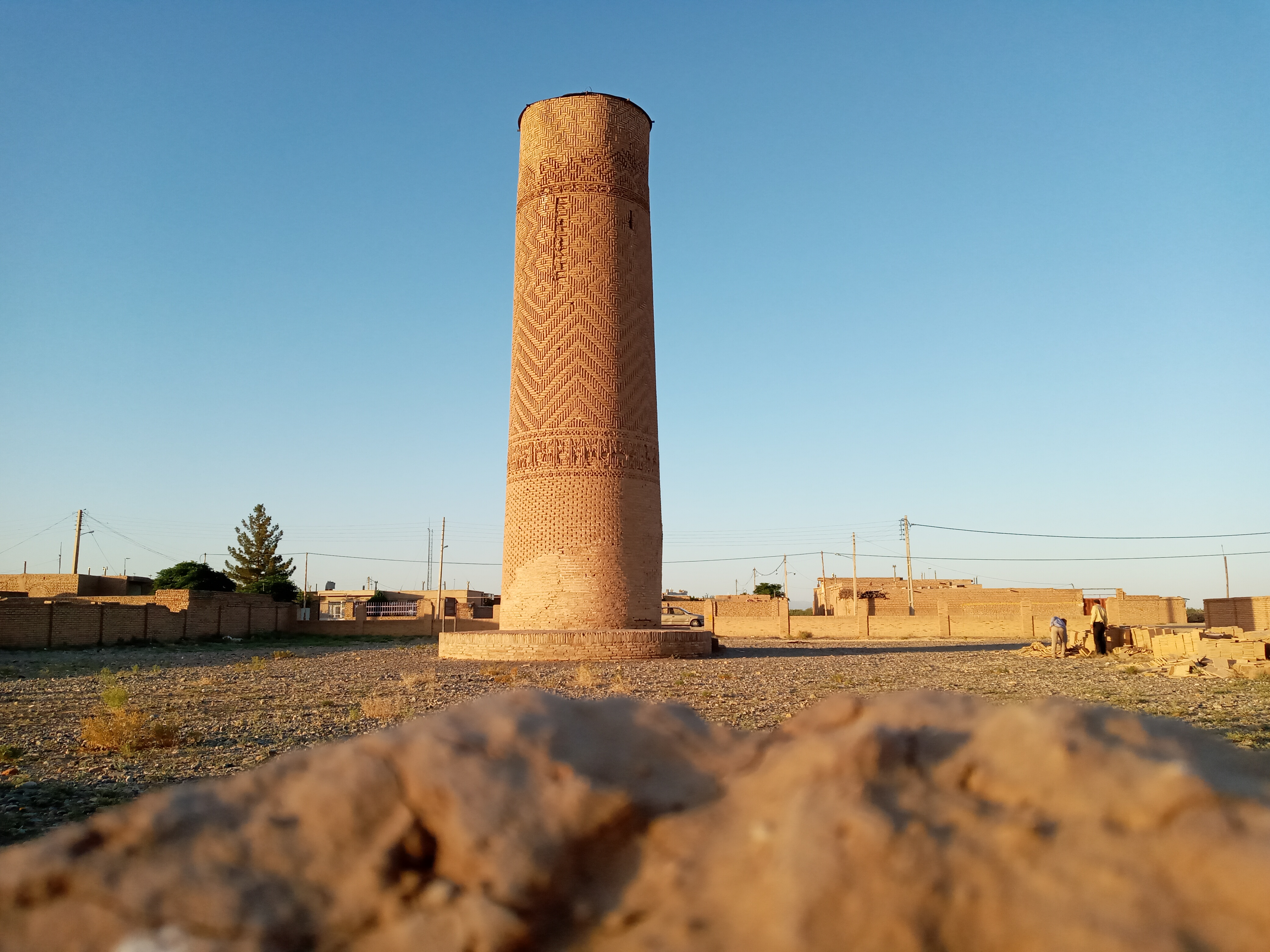
Firuzabad Tower

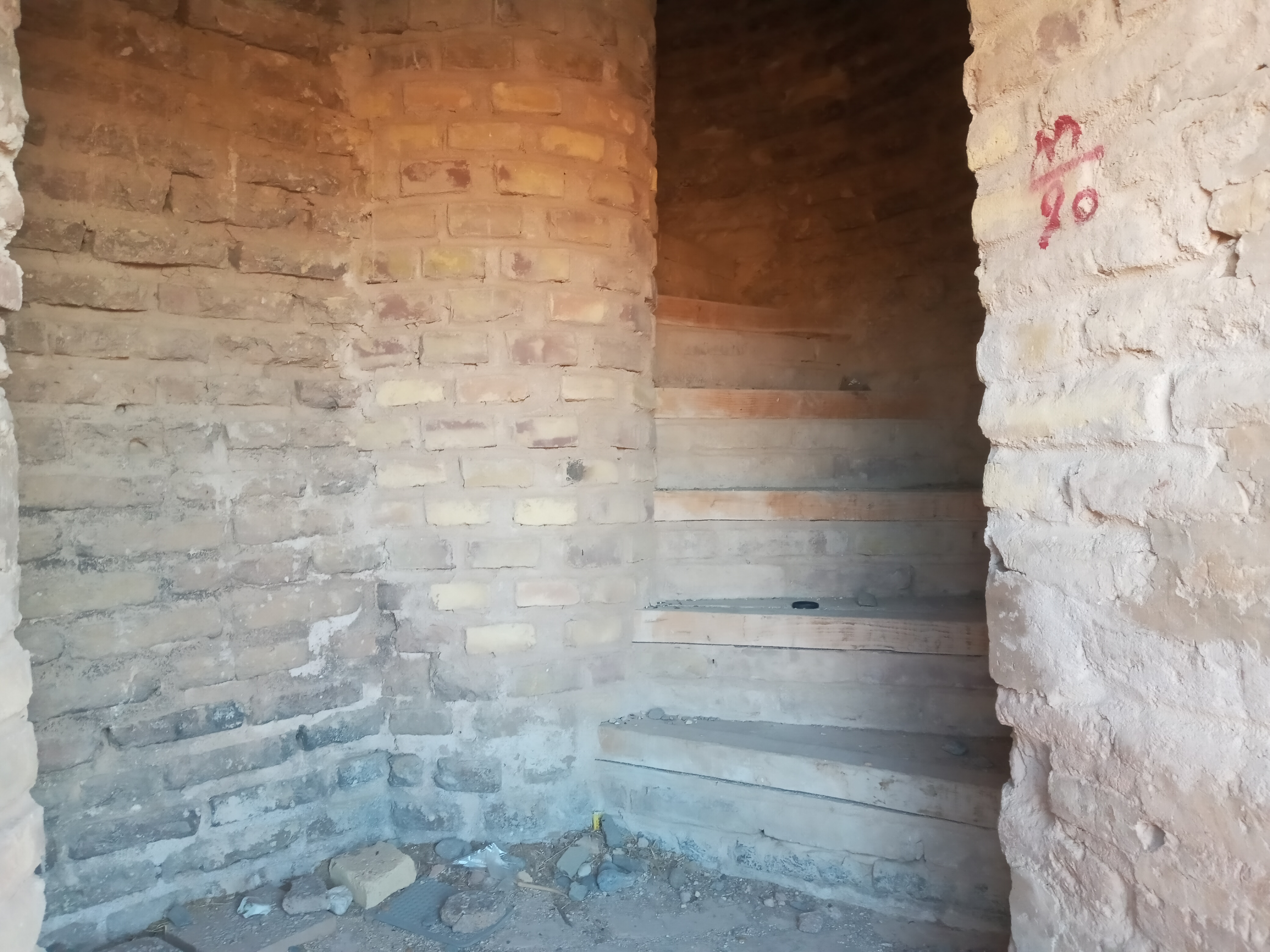
The stairs of Firuzabad Tower

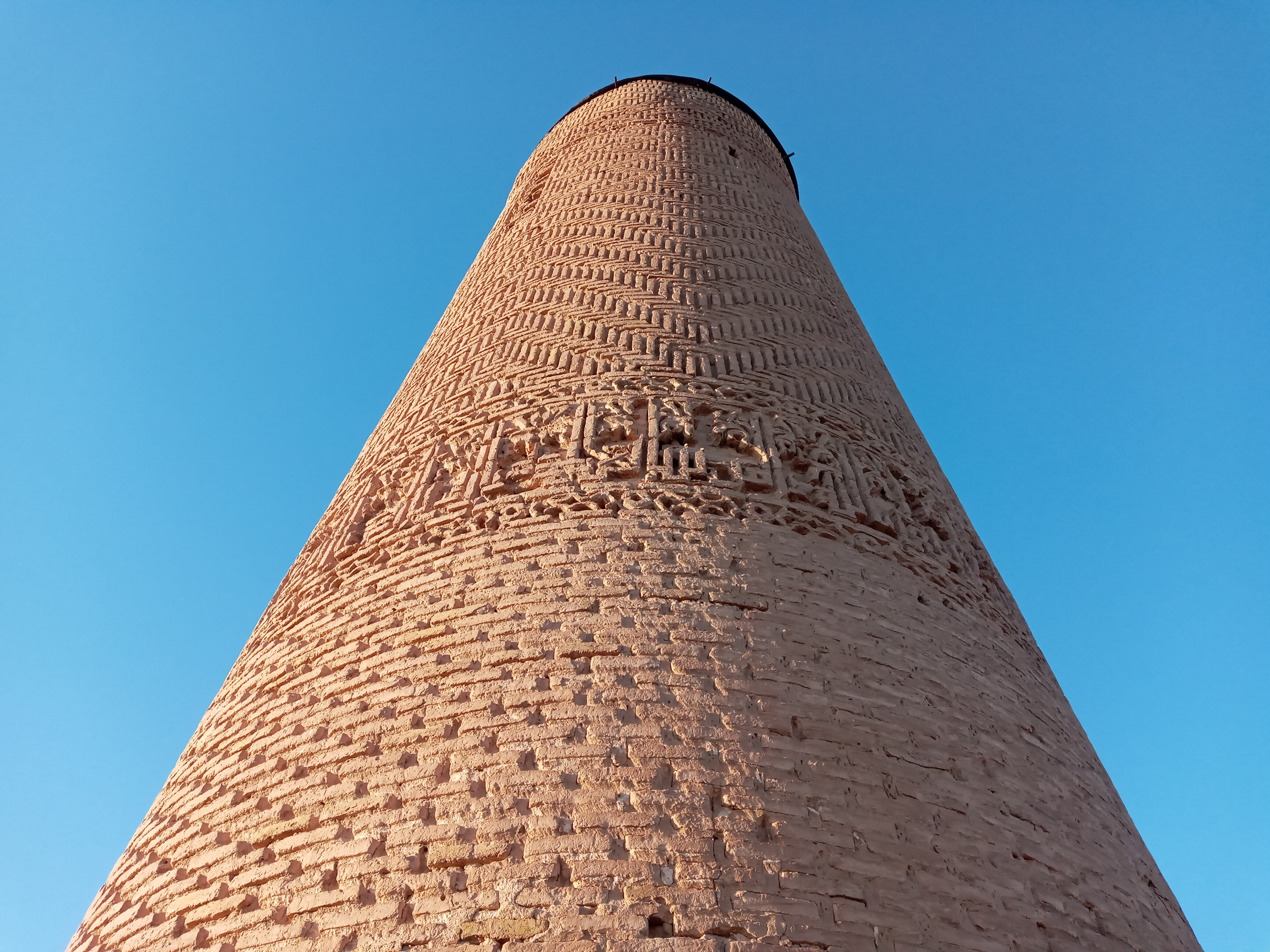
Firuzabad Tower

== See also ==
- Aliabad Tower
- Seyed Bagher Ab anbar
- Abdolabad Tomb
