= Ali Abadak =

Ali Abadak or Aliabadak (Persian: علي ابادك) may refer to:

- Aliabadak, Bardaskan
- Aliabadak, Razavi Khorasan
- Aliabadak, Yazd
