= Rahmaniyeh, Razavi Khorasan =

Village in Razavi Khorasan province, Iran

Rahmaniyeh Persian: رحمانيه
- Village
- Location within Iran
- Coordinates: 35°03′36″N 57°53′08″E
- Country: Iran
- Province: Razavi Khorasan
- County: Bardaskan
- District: Shahrabad
- Rural District: Shahrabad

Population (2016)
  - Total: 174
- Time zone: UTC+3:30 (IRST)

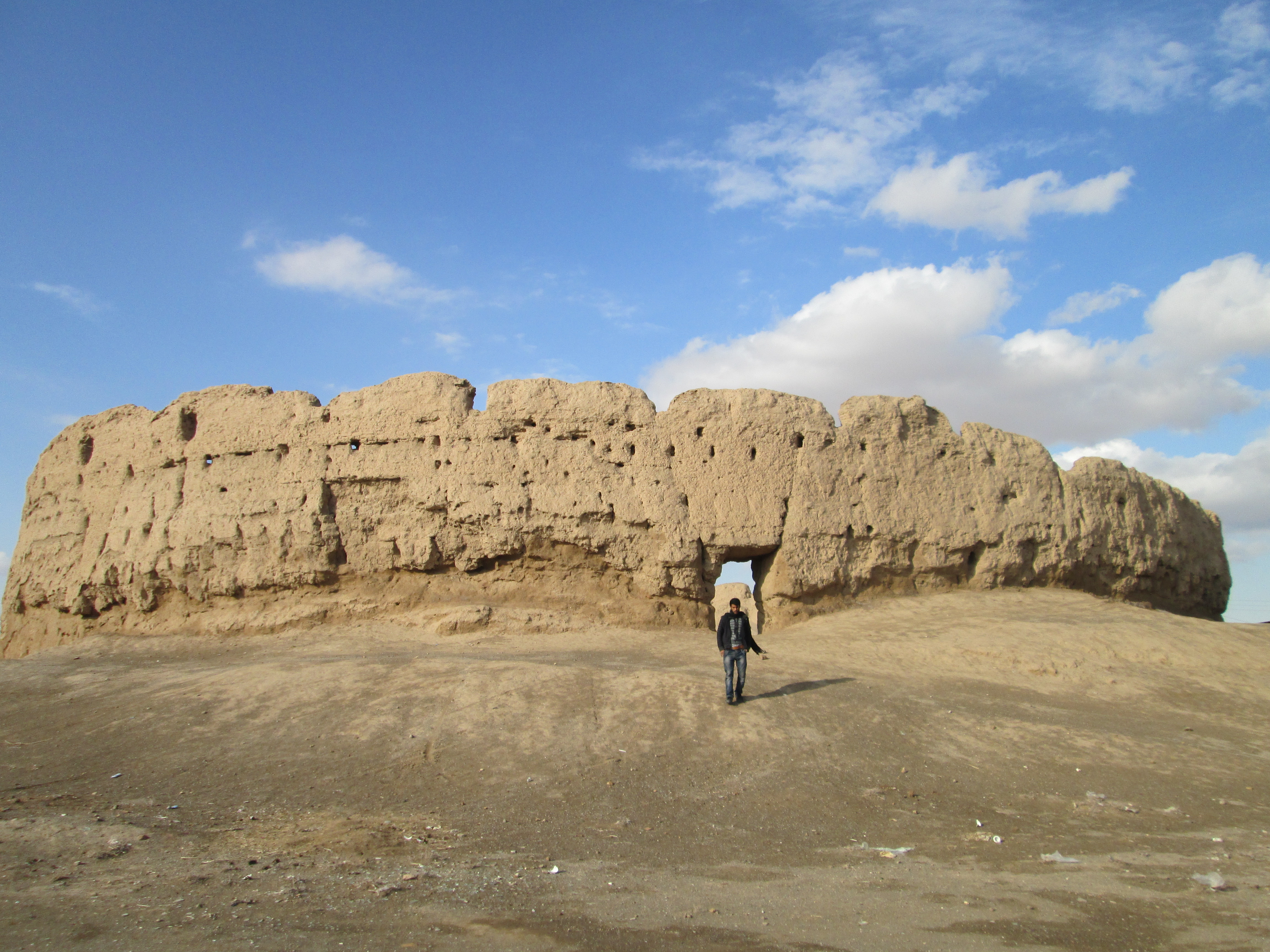
Rahmanniyeh Castle in 2015

Rahmaniyeh (Persian: رحمانيه) (Note: Also romanized as Raḩmānīyeh, Rahmanniyeh, and Raḩmānnīyeh) is a village in Shahrabad Rural District of Shahrabad District in Bardaskan County, Razavi Khorasan province, Iran.

== Demographics ==
=== Population ===
At the time of the 2006 National Census, the village's population was 150 in 38 households. The following census in 2011 counted 159 people in 43 households. The 2016 census measured the population of the village as 174 people in 54 households.
