= Zaherabad, Razavi Khorasan =

Village in Razavi Khorasan province, Iran

Zaherabad ظاهراباد
- Village
- Location within Iran
- Coordinates: 35°09′04″N 57°59′46″E
- Country: Iran
- Province: Razavi Khorasan
- County: Bardaskan
- District: Shahrabad
- Rural District: Jolgeh

Population (2016)
  - Total: 1,737
- Time zone: UTC+3:30 (IRST)

Zaherabad (Persian: ظاهراباد) (Note: Also romanized as Z̧āherābād; also known as Z̧ohrābāb) is a village in Jolgeh Rural District of Shahrabad District in Bardaskan County, Razavi Khorasan province, Iran.

== Demographics ==
=== Population ===
At the time of the 2006 National Census, the village's population was 1,606 in 401 households. The following census in 2011 counted 1,849 people in 500 households. The 2016 census measured the population of the village as 1,737 people in 525 households.
