= Hasanabad, Bardaskan =

Village in Razavi Khorasan province, Iran

Hasanabad Persian: حسن اباد
- Village
- Location within Iran
- Coordinates: 35°08′29″N 57°52′40″E
- Country: Iran
- Province: Razavi Khorasan
- County: Bardaskan
- District: Shahrabad
- Rural District: Shahrabad

Population (2016)
  - Total: 1,531
- Time zone: UTC+3:30 (IRST)

Hasanabad (Persian: حسن اباد) (Note: Also romanized as Ḩasanābād) is a village in Shahrabad Rural District of Shahrabad District in Bardaskan County, Razavi Khorasan province, Iran.

== Demographics ==
=== Population ===
At the time of the 2006 National Census, the village's population was 1,373 in 360 households. The following census in 2011 counted 1,468 people in 444 households. The 2016 census measured the population of the village as 1,531 people in 468 households.
