= Jalalabad, Shahrabad =

Village in Razavi Khorasan province, Iran

Jalalabad Persian: جلال اباد
- Village
- Location within Iran
- Coordinates: 35°06′40″N 57°55′17″E
- Country: Iran
- Province: Razavi Khorasan
- County: Bardaskan
- District: Shahrabad
- Rural District: Shahrabad

Population (2016)
  - Total: 894
- Time zone: UTC+3:30 (IRST)

Jalalabad (Persian: جلال اباد) (Note: Also romanized as Jalālābād) is a village in Shahrabad Rural District of Shahrabad District in Bardaskan County, Razavi Khorasan province, Iran.

== Demographics ==
=== Population ===
At the time of the 2006 National Census, the village's population was 843 in 214 households. The following census in 2011 counted 890 people in 269 households. The 2016 census measured the population of the village as 894 people in 284 households.
