= Zirakabad, Razavi Khorasan =

Village in Razavi Khorasan province, Iran

Zirakabad Persian: زیرک آباد
- Village
- Location within Iran
- Coordinates: 35°11′27″N 57°55′11″E
- Country: Iran
- Province: Razavi Khorasan
- County: Bardaskan
- District: Shahrabad
- Rural District: Shahrabad

Population (2016)
  - Total: 1,009
- Time zone: UTC+3:30 (IRST)

Zirakabad (Persian: زیرک آباد) (Note: Also romanized as Zīrakābād) is a village in Shahrabad Rural District of Shahrabad District in Bardaskan County, Razavi Khorasan province, Iran.

== Demographics ==
=== Population ===
At the time of the 2006 National Census, the village's population was 1,026 in 281 households. The following census in 2011 counted 970 people in 308 households. The 2016 census measured the population of the village as 1,009 people in 338 households.
