= Khorramabad, Bardaskan =

Village in Razavi Khorasan province, Iran

Khorramabad Persian: خرم اباد
- Village
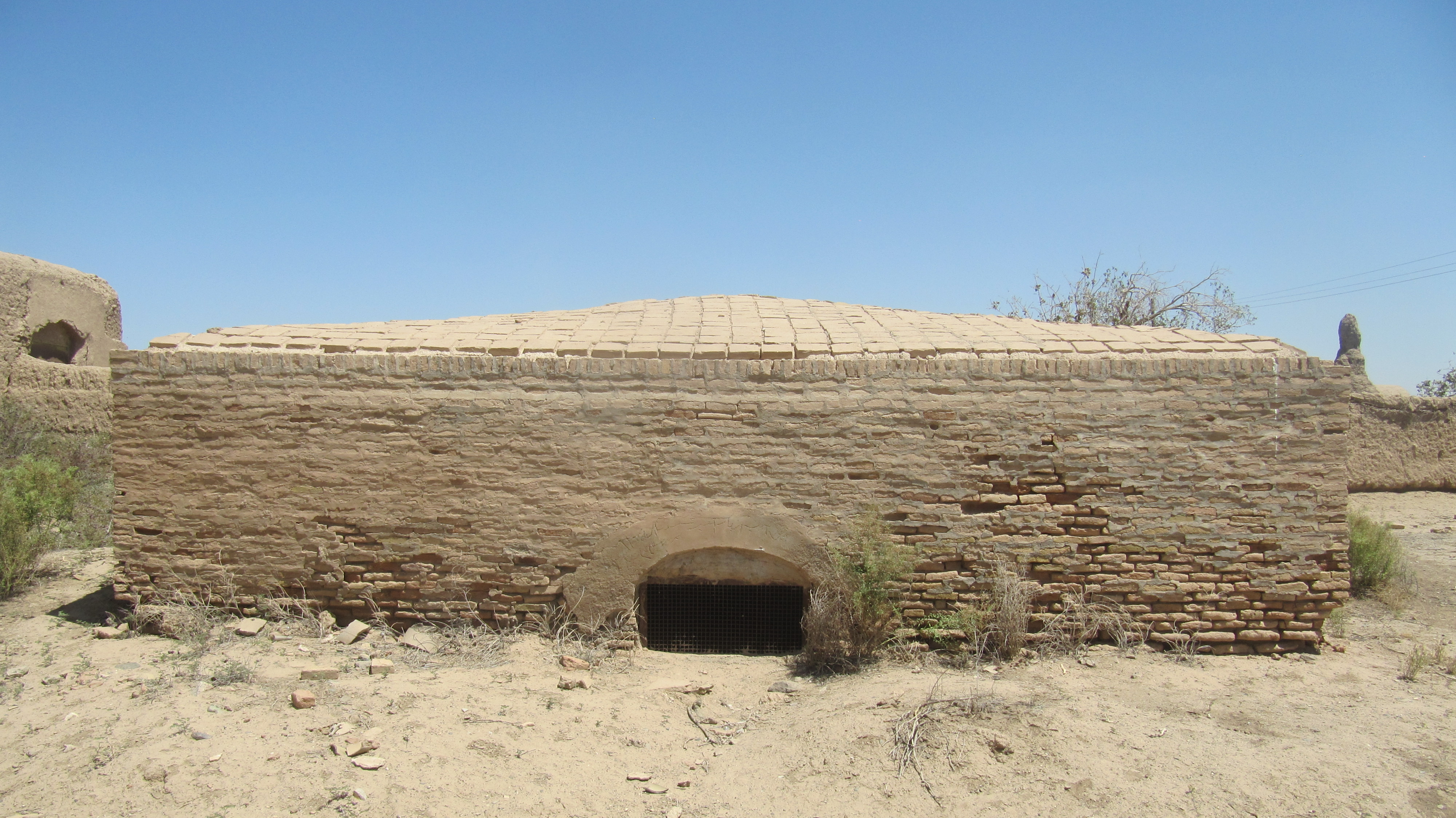
- Anbar water tank in the village of Khorramabad

- Location within Iran
- Coordinates: 35°09′59″N 57°56′05″E
- Country: Iran
- Province: Razavi Khorasan
- County: Bardaskan
- District: Shahrabad
- Rural District: Shahrabad

Population (2016)
  - Total: 754
- Time zone: UTC+3:30 (IRST)

Khorramabad (Persian: خرم اباد) (Note: Also romanized as Khorramābād; also known as Khurramābād) is a village in Shahrabad Rural District of Shahrabad District in Bardaskan County, Razavi Khorasan province, Iran.

== Demographics ==
=== Population ===
At the time of the 2006 National Census, the village's population was 676 in 174 households. The following census in 2011 counted 731 people in 208 households. The 2016 census measured the population of the village as 754 people in 237 households.
