= Firuzabad, Bardaskan =

Village in Razavi Khorasan province, Iran

Firuzabad فيروزاباد
- Village
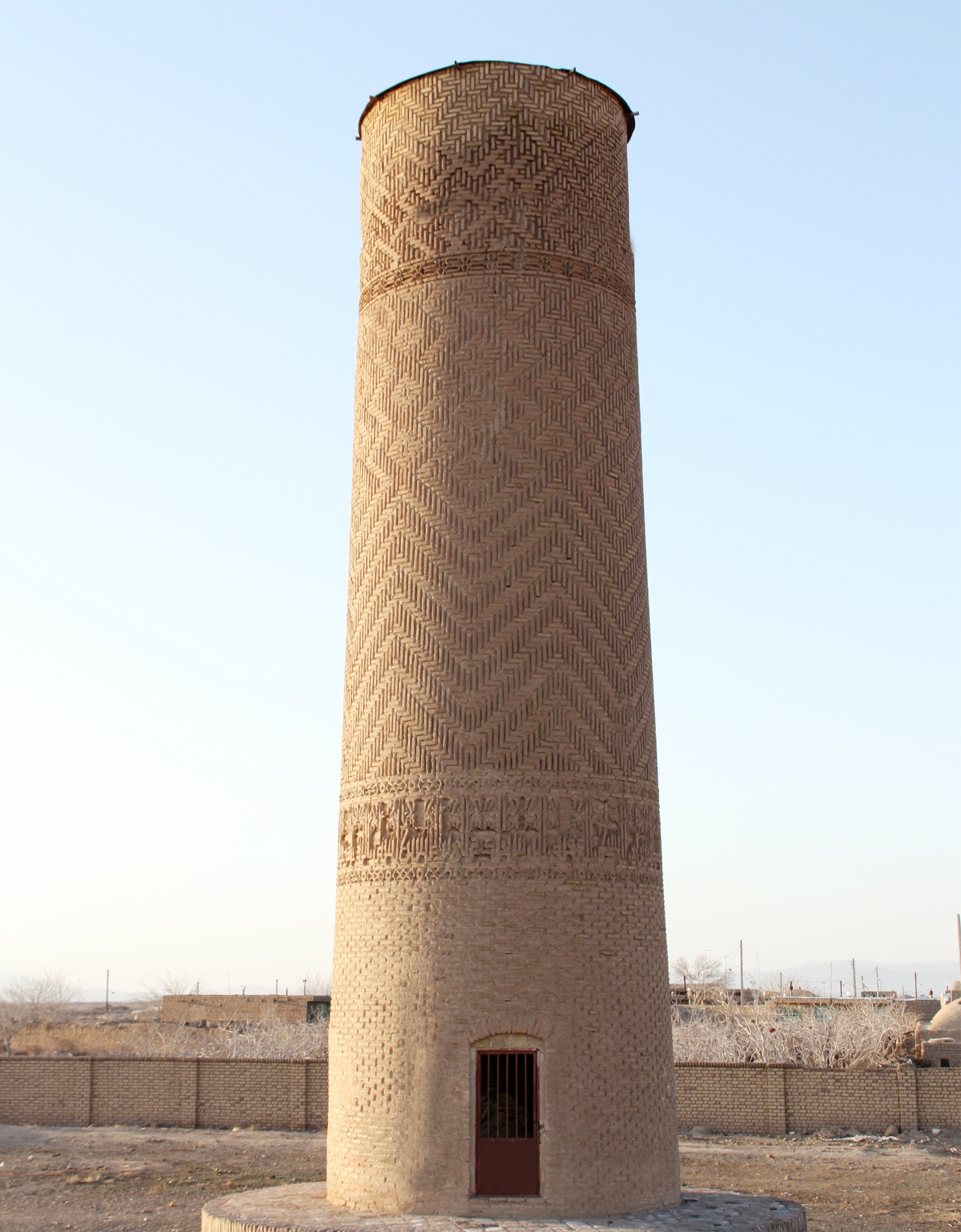
- Firuzabad tower

- Location within Iran
- Coordinates: 35°07′44″N 57°57′15″E
- Country: Iran
- Province: Razavi Khorasan
- County: Bardaskan
- District: Shahrabad
- Rural District: Jolgeh

Population (2016)
  - Total: 684
- Time zone: UTC+3:30 (IRST)

Firuzabad (Persian: فيروزاباد) (Note: Also romanized as Fīrūzābād) is a village in Jolgeh Rural District of Shahrabad District in Bardaskan County, Razavi Khorasan province, Iran.

== Demographics ==
=== Population ===
At the time of the 2006 National Census, the village's population was 661 in 195 households. The following census in 2011 counted 660 people in 211 households. The 2016 census measured the population of the village as 684 people in 236 households.
