= Zangineh =

Village in Razavi Khorasan province, Iran

Zangineh Persian: زنگينه
- Village
- Location within Iran
- Coordinates: 35°07′48″N 57°55′09″E
- Country: Iran
- Province: Razavi Khorasan
- County: Bardaskan
- District: Shahrabad
- Rural District: Shahrabad

Population (2016)
  - Total: 921
- Time zone: UTC+3:30 (IRST)

Zangineh (Persian: زنگينه) (Note: Also romanized as Zangīneh) is a village in Shahrabad Rural District of Shahrabad District in Bardaskan County, Razavi Khorasan province, Iran.

== Demographics ==
=== Population ===
At the time of the 2006 National Census, the village's population was 859 in 192 households. The following census in 2011 counted 861 people in 239 households. The 2016 census measured the population of the village as 921 people in 269 households.
