= Azimabad, Razavi Khorasan =

Village in Razavi Khorasan province, Iran

Azimabad عظيم اباد
- Village
- Location within Iran
- Coordinates: 35°09′19″N 58°04′16″E
- Country: Iran
- Province: Razavi Khorasan
- County: Bardaskan
- District: Shahrabad
- Rural District: Jolgeh

Population (2016)
  - Total: 1,067
- Time zone: UTC+3:30 (IRST)

Azimabad (Persian: عظيم اباد) (Note: Also romanized as ‘Az̧īmābād) is a village in Jolgeh Rural District of Shahrabad District in Bardaskan County, Razavi Khorasan province, Iran.

== Demographics ==
=== Population ===
At the time of the 2006 National Census, the village's population was 1,075 in 287 households. The following census in 2011 counted 1,205 people in 341 households. The 2016 census measured the population of the village as 1,067 people in 334 households.
