= Roknabad, Razavi Khorasan =

Village in Razavi Khorasan province, Iran

Roknabad رکن‌آباد
- Village
- Location within Iran
- Coordinates: 35°08′55″N 58°02′53″E
- Country: Iran
- Province: Razavi Khorasan
- County: Bardaskan
- District: Shahrabad
- Rural District: Jolgeh

Population (2016)
  - Total: 2,039
- Time zone: UTC+3:30 (IRST)

Roknabad (Persian: رکن‌آباد) (Note: Also romanized as Roknābād; also known as Rowkhnābād and Ruknābād) is a village in, and the capital of, Jolgeh Rural District in Shahrabad District of Bardaskan County, Razavi Khorasan province, Iran.

== Demographics ==
=== Population ===
At the time of the 2006 National Census, the village's population was 1,963 in 513 households. The following census in 2011 counted 1,984 people in 597 households. The 2016 census measured the population of the village as 2,039 people in 640 households, the most populous in its rural district.
