= Cheragh Chin =

Village in Razavi Khorasan province, Iran

Cheragh Chin چراغ چين
- Village
- Location within Iran
- Country: Iran
- Province: Razavi Khorasan
- County: Bardaskan
- District: Shahrabad
- Rural District: Jolgeh

Population (2016)
  - Total: Below reporting threshold
- Time zone: UTC+3:30 (IRST)

Cheragh Chin (Persian: چراغ چين) (Note: Also romanized as Cherāgh Chīn) is a village in Jolgeh Rural District of Shahrabad District in Bardaskan County, Razavi Khorasan province, Iran.

== Demographics ==
=== Population ===
At the time of the 2006 National Census, the village's population was 38 in eight households. The following census in 2011 counted 22 people in five households. The 2016 census measured the population of the village as below the reporting threshold.
