= Kosheh =

Kosheh may refer to:

- Kosheh, Egypt
- Kosheh Massacres
- Kosheh, Iran
