= Quzhdabad =

Village in Razavi Khorasan province, Iran

Quzhdabad قوژداباد
- Village
- Location within Iran
- Coordinates: 35°08′27″N 58°02′07″E
- Country: Iran
- Province: Razavi Khorasan
- County: Bardaskan
- District: Shahrabad
- Rural District: Jolgeh

Population (2016)
  - Total: 779
- Time zone: UTC+3:30 (IRST)

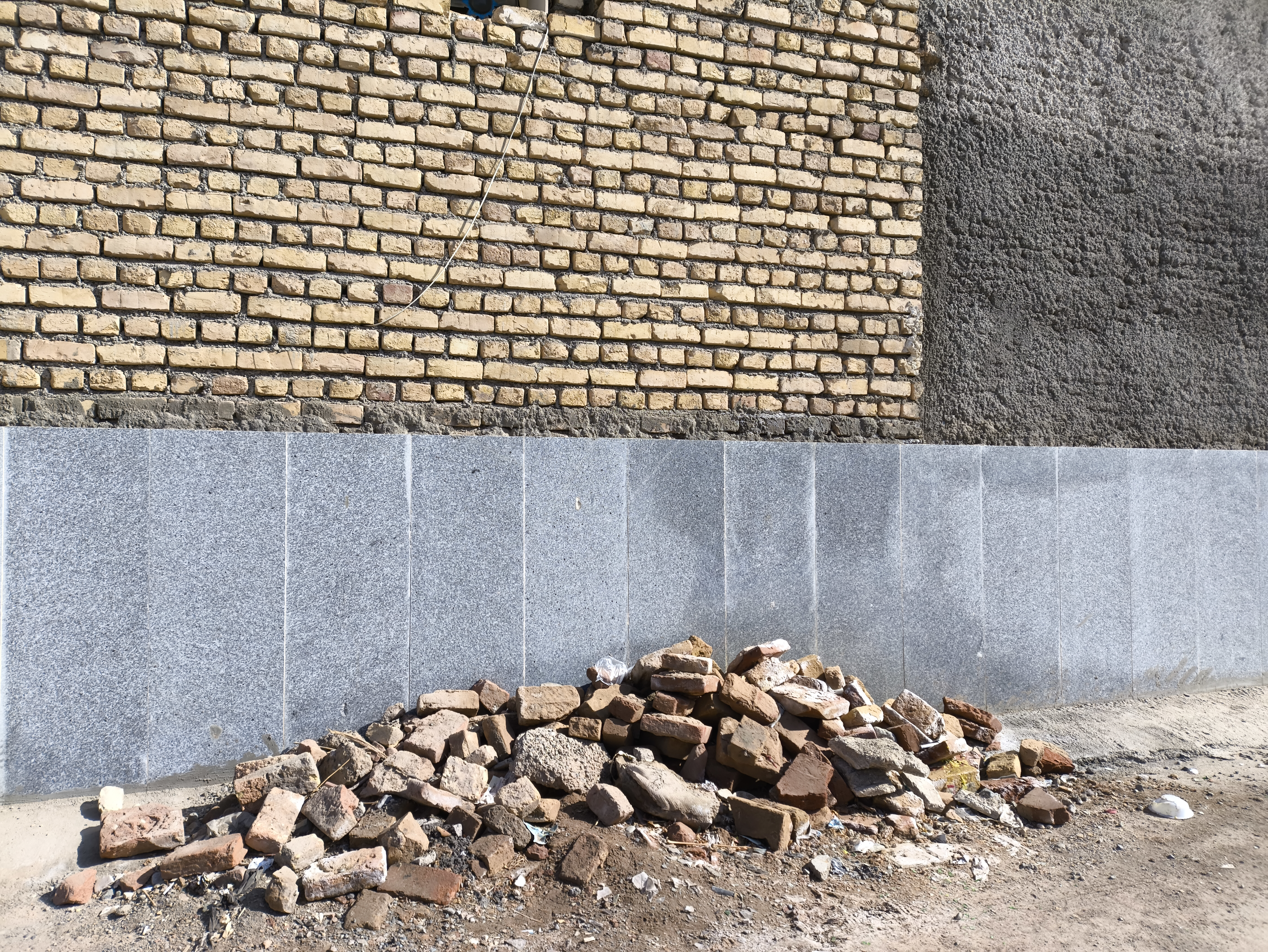
Quzhdabad Anbar in 2025

Quzhdabad (Persian: قوژداباد) (Note: Also romanized as Qūzhdābād) is a village in Jolgeh Rural District of Shahrabad District in Bardaskan County, Razavi Khorasan province, Iran.

== Demographics ==
=== Population ===
At the time of the 2006 National Census, the village's population was 627 in 178 households. The following census in 2011 counted 735 people in 228 households. The 2016 census measured the population of the village as 779 people in 247 households.
