= Nasrabad, Bardaskan =

Village in Razavi Khorasan province, Iran

Nasrabad نصراباد
- Village
- Location within Iran
- Coordinates: 35°07′13″N 58°01′10″E
- Country: Iran
- Province: Razavi Khorasan
- County: Bardaskan
- District: Shahrabad
- Rural District: Jolgeh

Population (2016)
  - Total: 251
- Time zone: UTC+3:30 (IRST)

Nasrabad (Persian: نصراباد) (Note: Also romanized as Naşrābād) is a village in Jolgeh Rural District of Shahrabad District in Bardaskan County, Razavi Khorasan province, Iran.

== Demographics ==
=== Population ===
At the time of the 2006 National Census, the village's population was 223 in 55 households. The following census in 2011 counted 211 people in 58 households. The 2016 census measured the population of the village as 251 people in 75 households.
