= Kazemabad, Bardaskan =

Village in Razavi Khorasan province, Iran

Kazemabad Persian: كاظم اباد
- Village
- Location within Iran
- Coordinates: 35°07′25″N 57°53′57″E
- Country: Iran
- Province: Razavi Khorasan
- County: Bardaskan
- District: Shahrabad
- Rural District: Shahrabad

Population (2016)
  - Total: 1,175
- Time zone: UTC+3:30 (IRST)

Kazemabad (Persian: كاظم اباد) (Note: Also romanized as Kāz̧emābād) is a village in Shahrabad Rural District of Shahrabad District in Bardaskan County, Razavi Khorasan province, Iran.

== Demographics ==
=== Population ===
At the time of the 2006 National Census, the village's population was 1,020 in 263 households. The following census in 2011 counted 1,108 people in 347 households. The 2016 census measured the population of the village as 1,175 people in 378 households.
