= Soltanabad, Bardaskan =

Village in Razavi Khorasan province, Iran

Soltanabad سلطان اباد
- Village
- Location within Iran
- Country: Iran
- Province: Razavi Khorasan
- County: Bardaskan
- District: Shahrabad
- Rural District: Jolgeh

Population (2016)
  - Total: 75
- Time zone: UTC+3:30 (IRST)

Soltanabad (Persian: سلطان اباد) (Note: Also romanized as Solţānābād) is a village in Jolgeh Rural District of Shahrabad District in Bardaskan County, Razavi Khorasan province, Iran.

== Demographics ==
=== Population ===
At the time of the 2006 National Census, the village's population was 41 in eight households. The following census in 2011 counted 95 people in 26 households. The 2016 census measured the population of the village as 75 people in 25 households.
