= Shahrabad, Razavi Khorasan =

City in Razavi Khorasan province, Iran

Shahrabad Persian: شهرآباد
- City
- Location within Iran
- Coordinates: 35°08′54″N 57°56′07″E
- Country: Iran
- Province: Razavi Khorasan
- County: Bardaskan
- District: Shahrabad
- Established as a city: 2009

Population (2016)
  - Total: 2,083
- Time zone: UTC+3:30 (IRST)

Shahrabad (Persian: شهرآباد) (Note: Also romanized as Shahrābād) is a city in, and the capital of, Shahrabad District in Bardaskan County, Razavi Khorasan province, Iran. It also serves as the administrative center for Shahrabad Rural District. As a village, it was the capital of Kenarshahr Rural District until its capital was transferred to the village of Shafiabad.

== Demographics ==
=== Population ===
At the time of the 2006 National Census, Shahrabad's population was 2,185 in 523 households, when it was a village in Shahrabad Rural District. The following census in 2011 counted 2,255 people in 581 households, by which time the village had been converted to a city. The 2016 census measured the population of the city as 2,083 people in 644 households.
