= Abdolabad, Bardaskan =

Village in Razavi Khorasan province, Iran

Abdolabad عبدل اباد
- Village
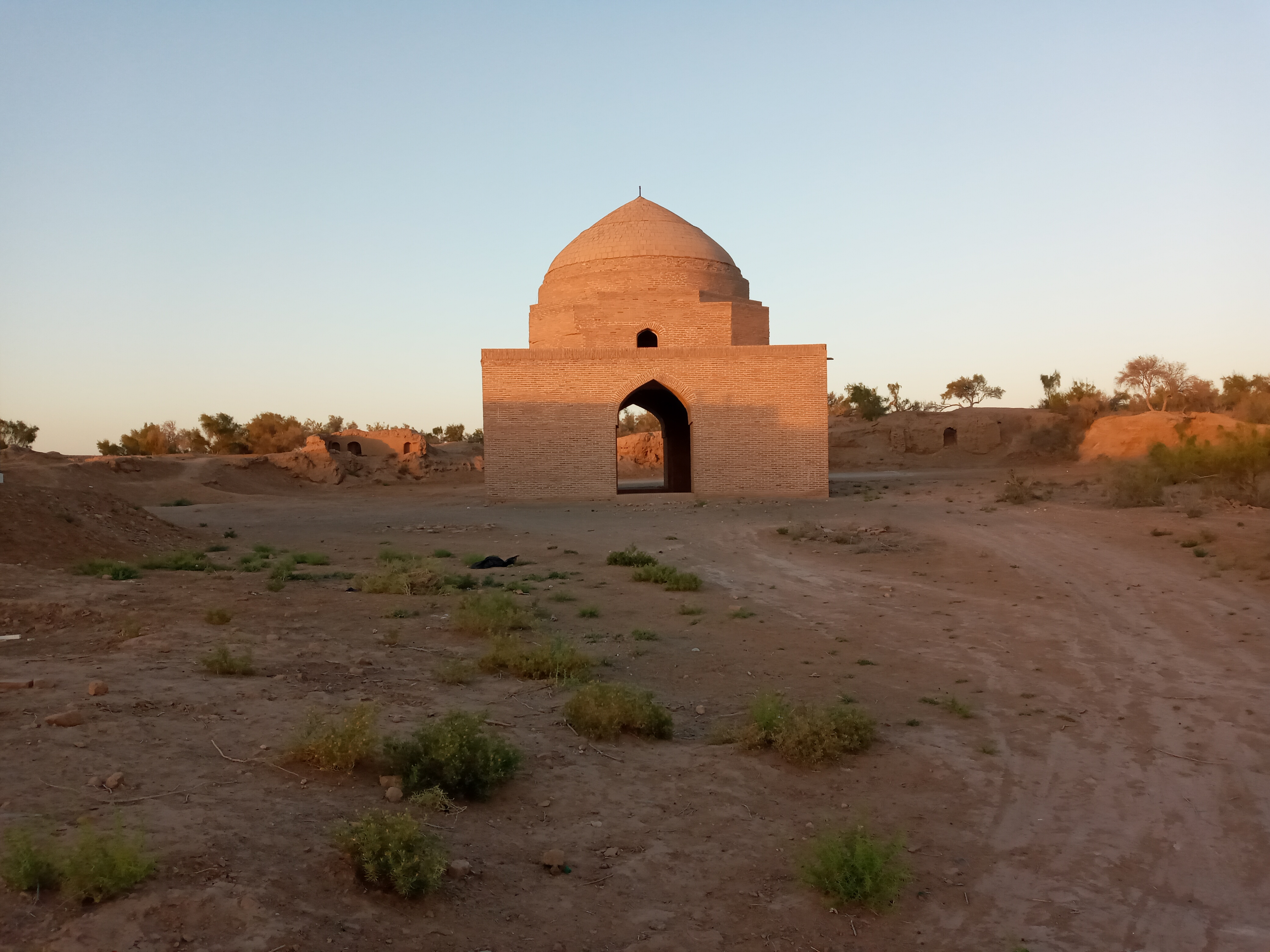
- Abdolabad Mosque in 2021

- Location within Iran
- Coordinates: 35°05′50″N 57°58′32″E
- Country: Iran
- Province: Razavi Khorasan
- County: Bardaskan
- District: Shahrabad
- Rural District: Jolgeh

Population (2016)
  - Total: 194
- Time zone: UTC+3:30 (IRST)

Abdolabad (Persian: عبدل اباد) (Note: Also romanized as ‘Abdolābād; also known as ‘Abdollāhābād) is a village in Jolgeh Rural District of Shahrabad District in Bardaskan County, Razavi Khorasan province, Iran.

== Demographics ==
=== Population ===
At the time of the 2006 National Census, the village's population was 181 in 49 households. The following census in 2011 counted 187 people in 54 households. The 2016 census measured the population of the village as 194 people in 62 households.
