= Seyyed Bagher Ab anbar =

Coordinates: 35°09′00″N 57°34′12″E

Seyed Bagher Ab anbar
- آب‌انبار سید باقر
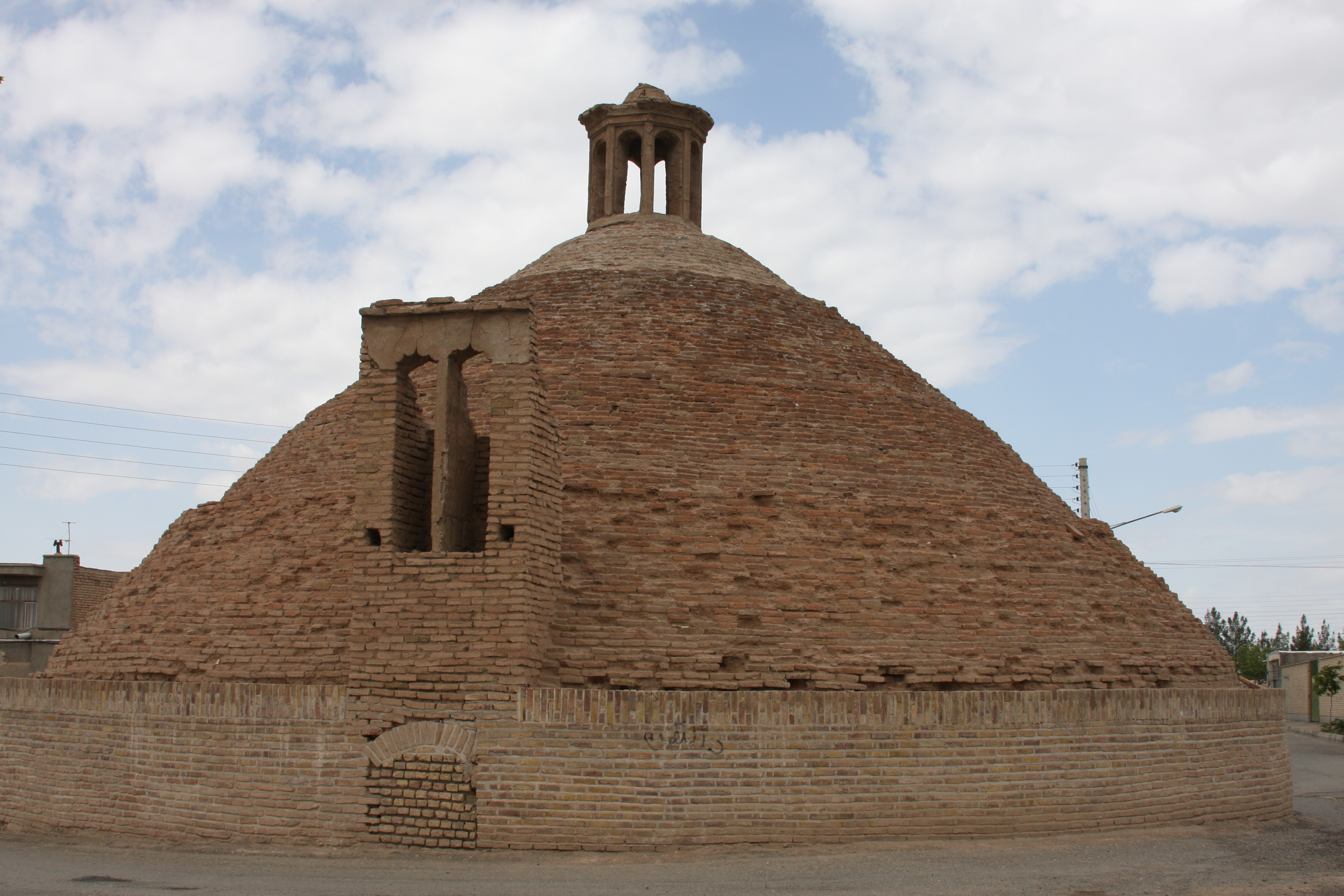
- Interactive map of the Seyed Bagher Ab anbar area

General information
- Type: Ab anbar
- Location: Ghaem Avenue, Bardaskan, Iran

Design and construction
- Designations: National Monuments of Iran

The Seyed Bagher Ab anbar (Persian: آب‌انبار سید باقر) is a historical Ab anbar of Qajar dynasty that is located in city center of Bardaskan, in Ghaem Avenue. This Ab anbar was added to the list of National Monuments of Iran As the 11034st monument.

== Gallery ==
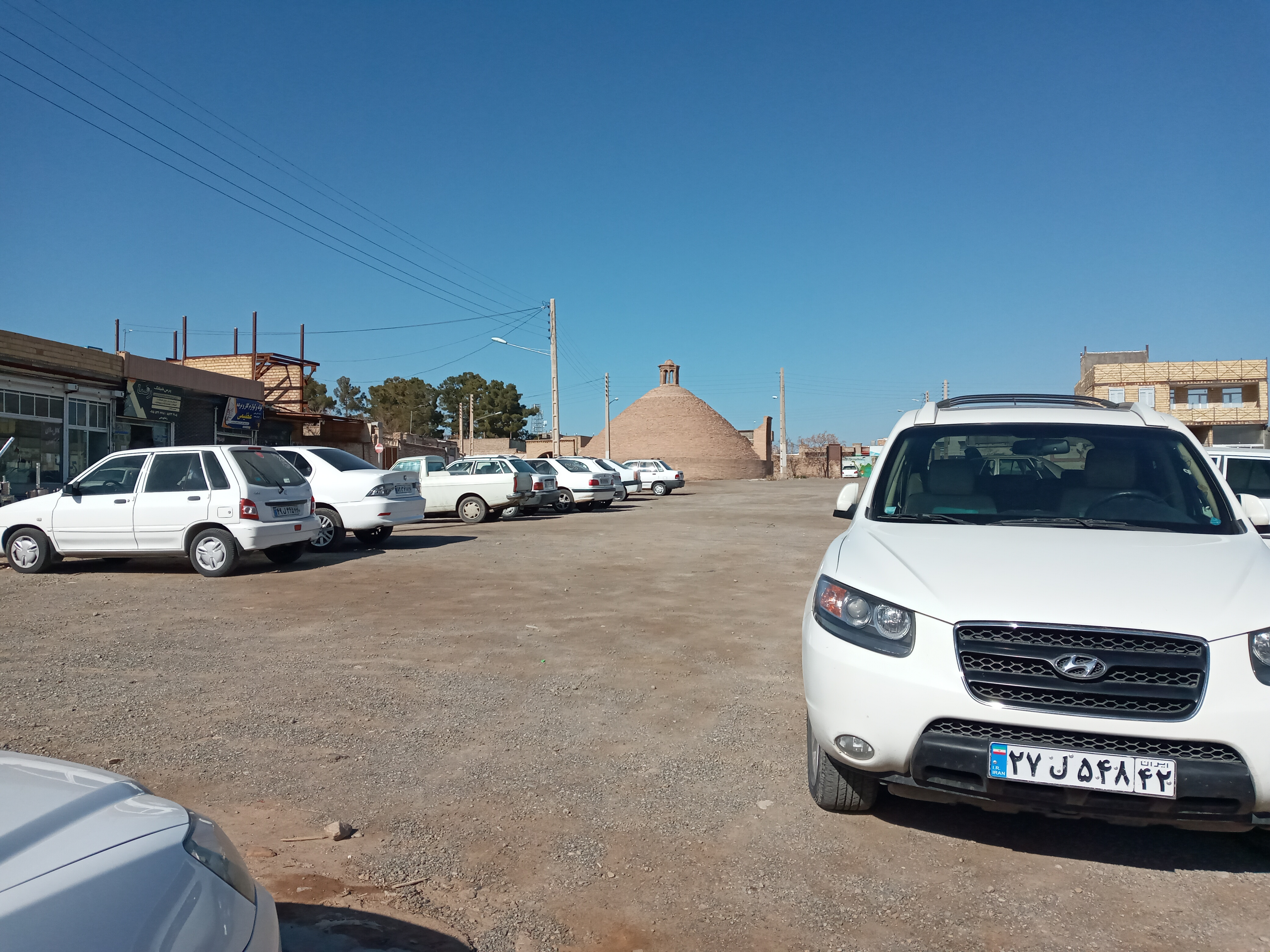

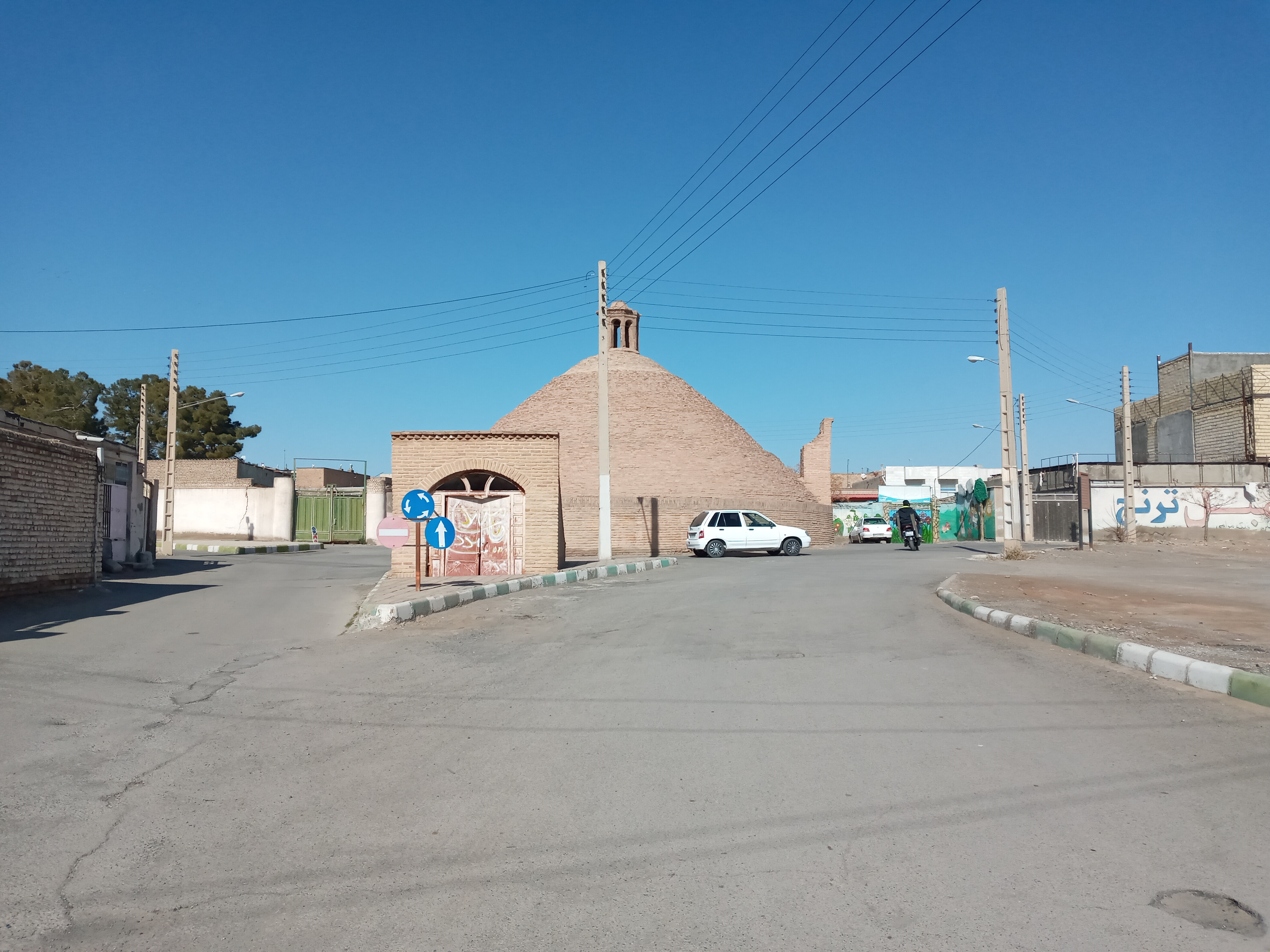
A view of the Ab anbar

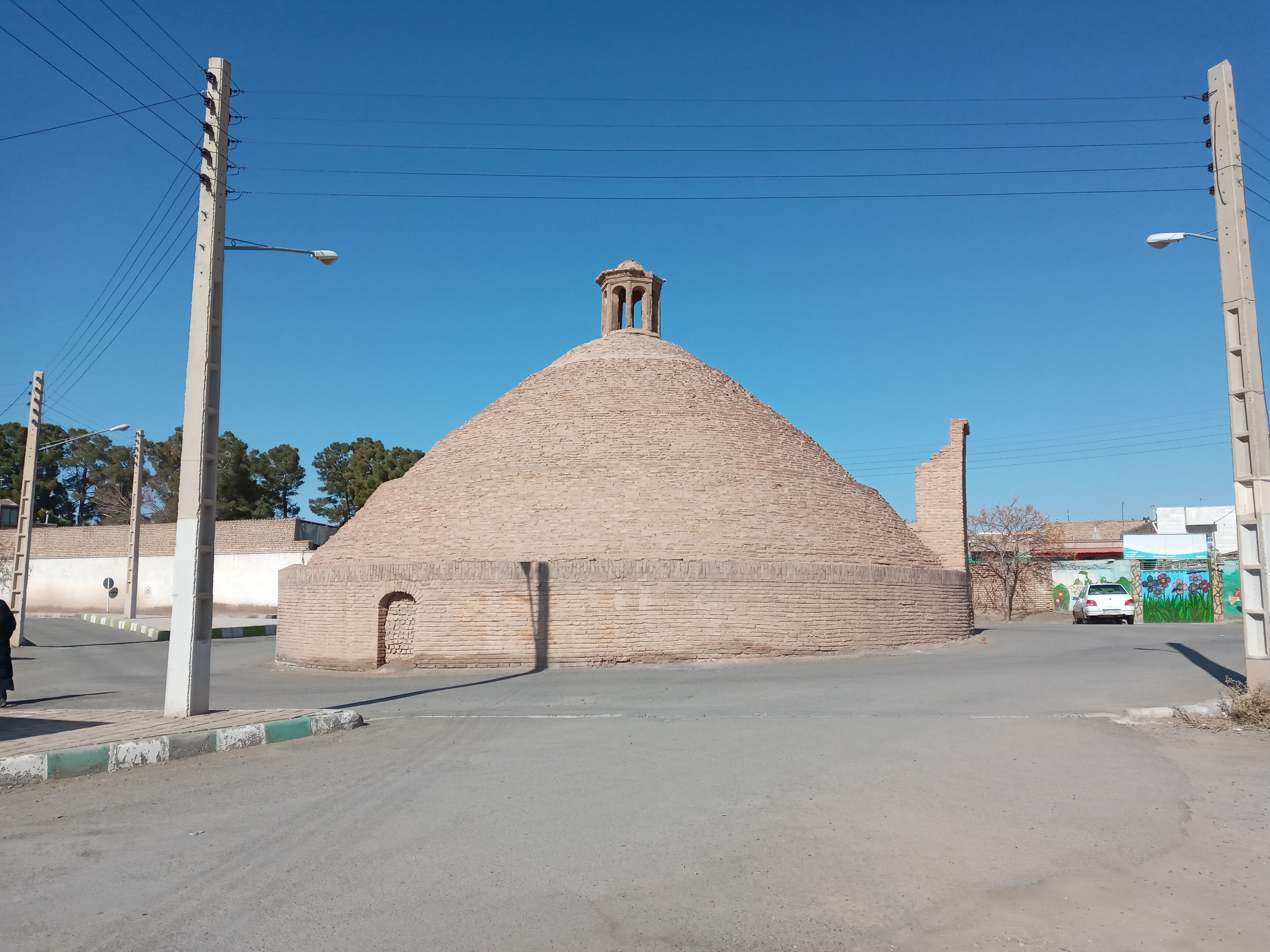
An outside view

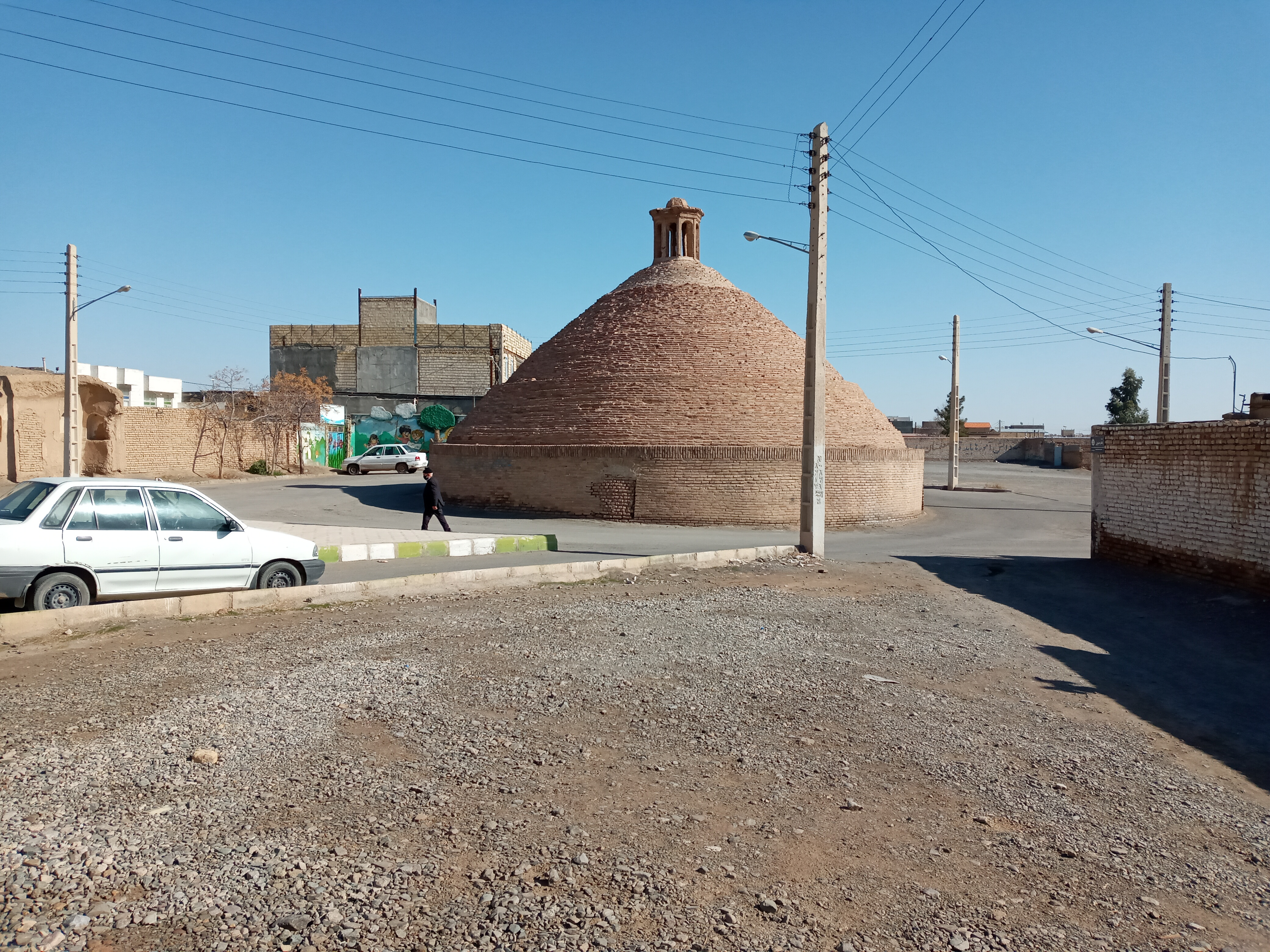

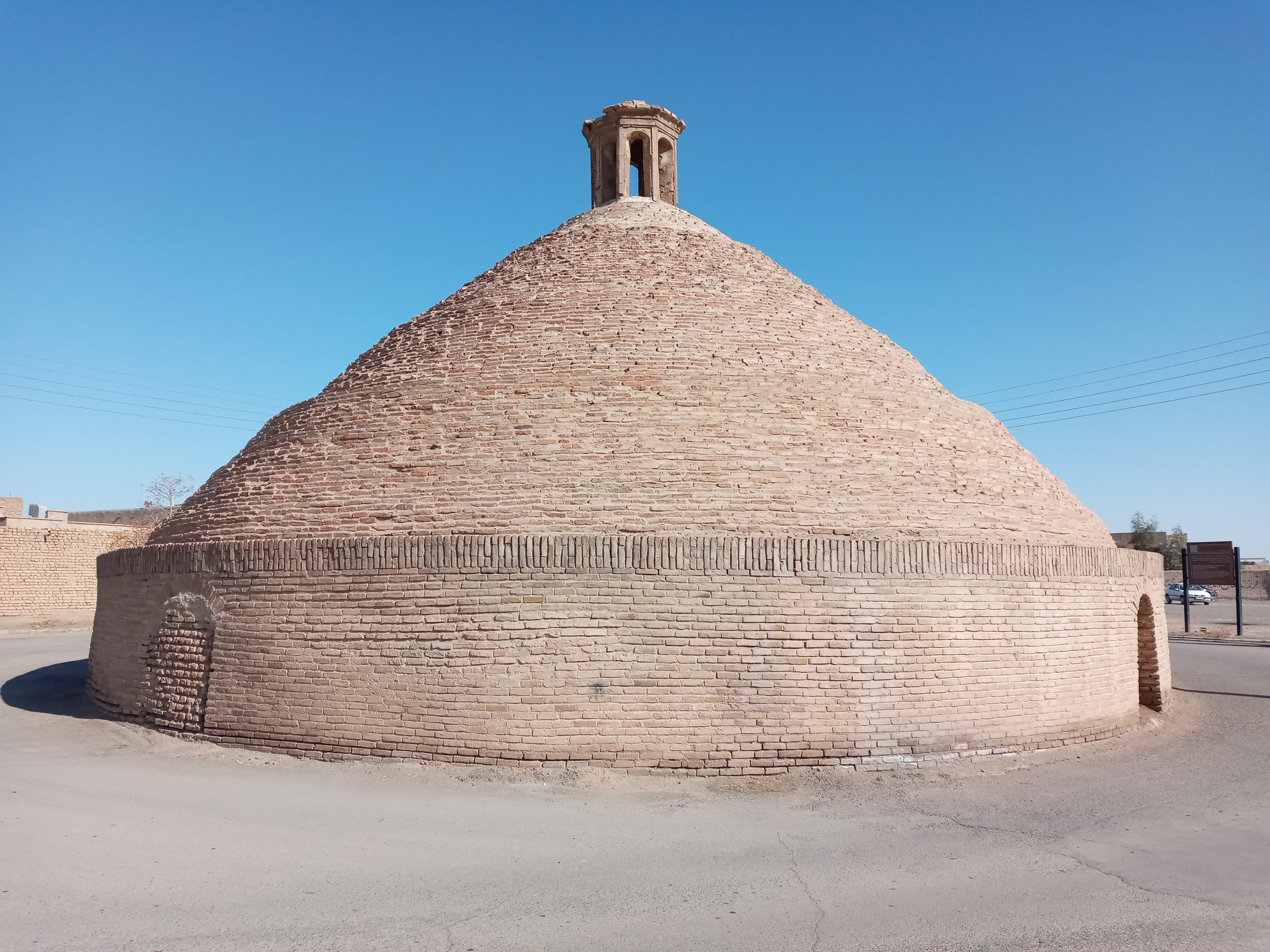

== See also ==
- Aliabad Tower
- Firuzabad Tower
- Abdolabad Tomb
- Cultural Heritage, Handcrafts and Tourism Organization
- Iran National Heritage List
