= Kusheh, Bardaskan =

Village in Razavi Khorasan province, Iran

Kusheh Persian: كوشه
- Village
- Location within Iran
- Coordinates: 35°09′20″N 57°58′24″E
- Country: Iran
- Province: Razavi Khorasan
- County: Bardaskan
- District: Shahrabad
- Rural District: Shahrabad

Population (2016)
  - Total: 1,627
- Time zone: UTC+3:30 (IRST)

Kusheh (Persian: كوشه) (Note: Also romanized as Kūsheh; also known as Kosheh) is a village in Shahrabad Rural District of Shahrabad District in Bardaskan County, Razavi Khorasan province, Iran.

== Demographics ==
=== Population ===
At the time of the 2006 National Census, the village's population was 1,768 in 419 households. The following census in 2011 counted 1,673 people in 473 households. The 2016 census measured the population of the village as 1,627 people in 511 households, the most populous in its rural district.
