= Aliabad Tower =

- برج علی‌آباد

- Location within Iran
- Alternative names: Keshmar Tower, Aliabade-Keshmar Tower

General information
- Type: Tower
- Location: Aliabad, Bardaskan, Razavi Khorasan, Iran
- Coordinates: 35°17′31″N 58°06′11″E
- Completed: 14th century

Height
- Height: 18 metres (59 ft)

Dimensions
- Circumference: 42 metres (138 ft)

Technical details
- Material: Brick

Design and construction
- Architect

Iran National Heritage List
- Official name: Aliabad Tower
- Type: Funerary Tower
- Designated: 1932
- Reference no.: 127
- Conservation organization: Cultural Heritage, Handicrafts and Tourism Organization of Iran

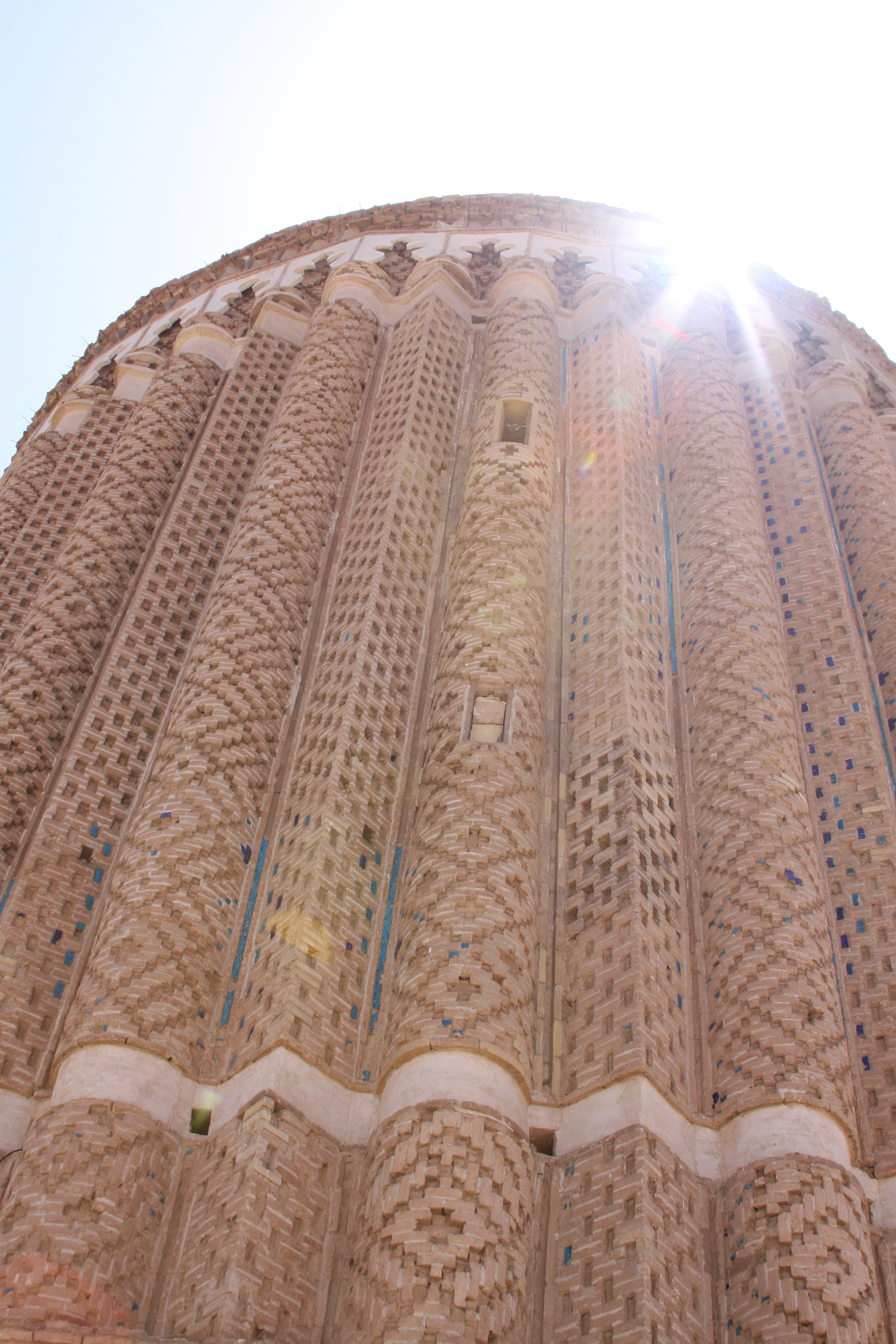

The Aliabad Tower (Persian: برج علی‌آباد) is a historical tower dating to the 14th century. It is located in Aliabad-e Keshmar, near the town of Bardaskan in the Iranian province of Razavi Khorasan. The tower measures 18 metres (59 ft) in height, with an outer circumference of 42 metres (138 ft) and an internal height of 21 metres (69 ft). The cone-shaped facade is made of brick. The design is reminiscent of the Dakhma of Zoroastrianism. The tower was added to the list of National Monuments of Iran.

== Gallery ==
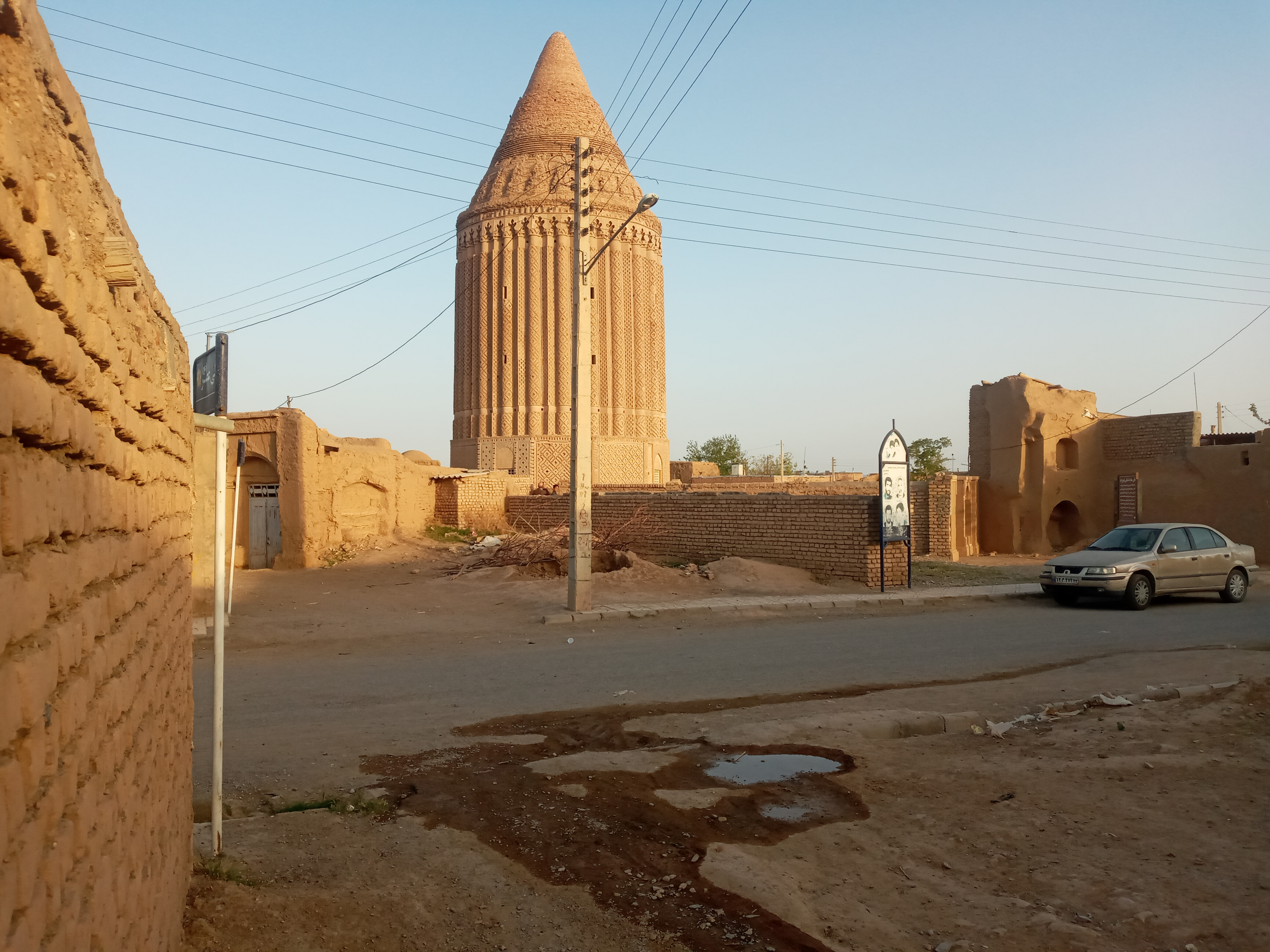
Tower from distance

Tower from distance

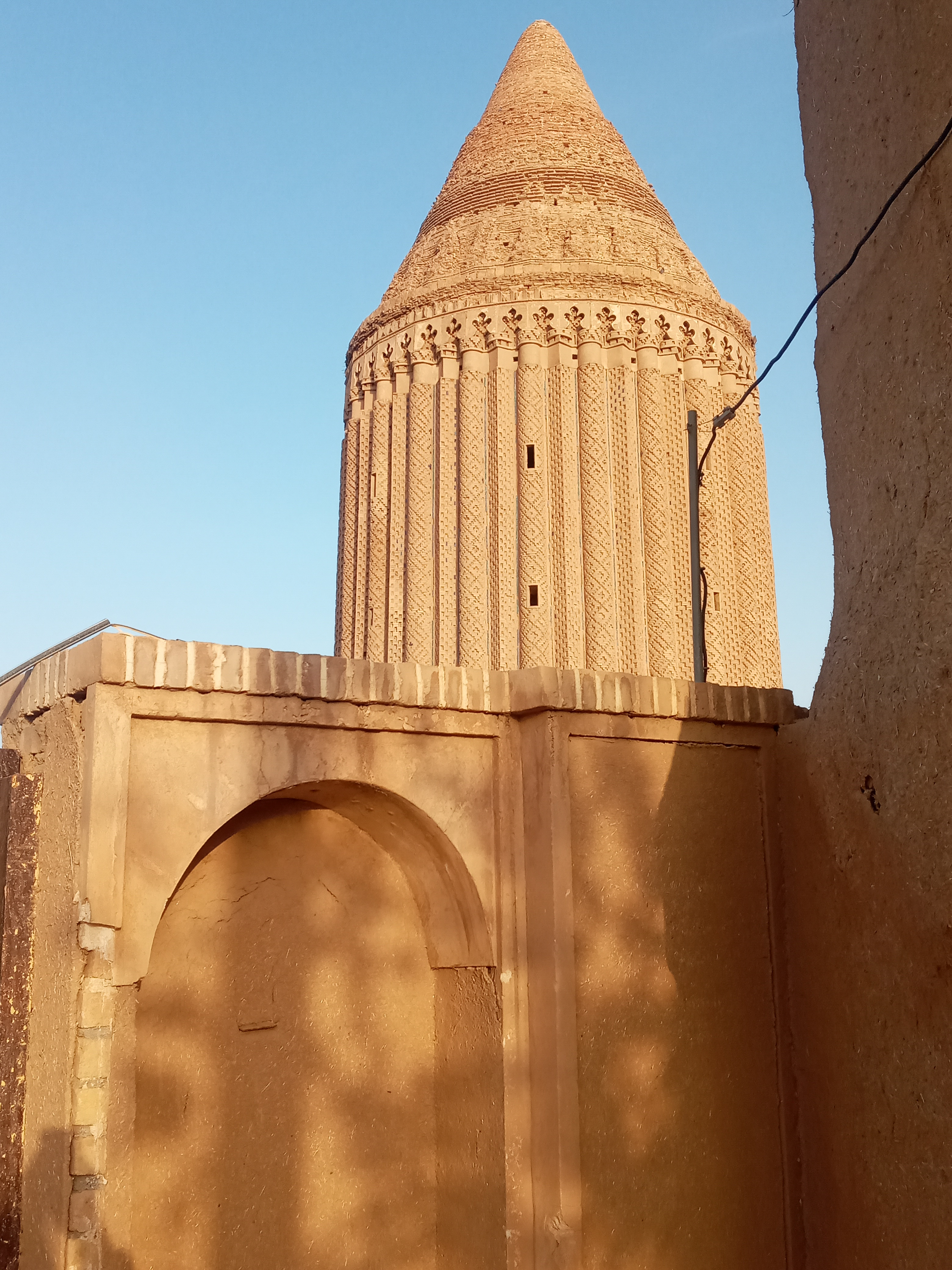
Exterior

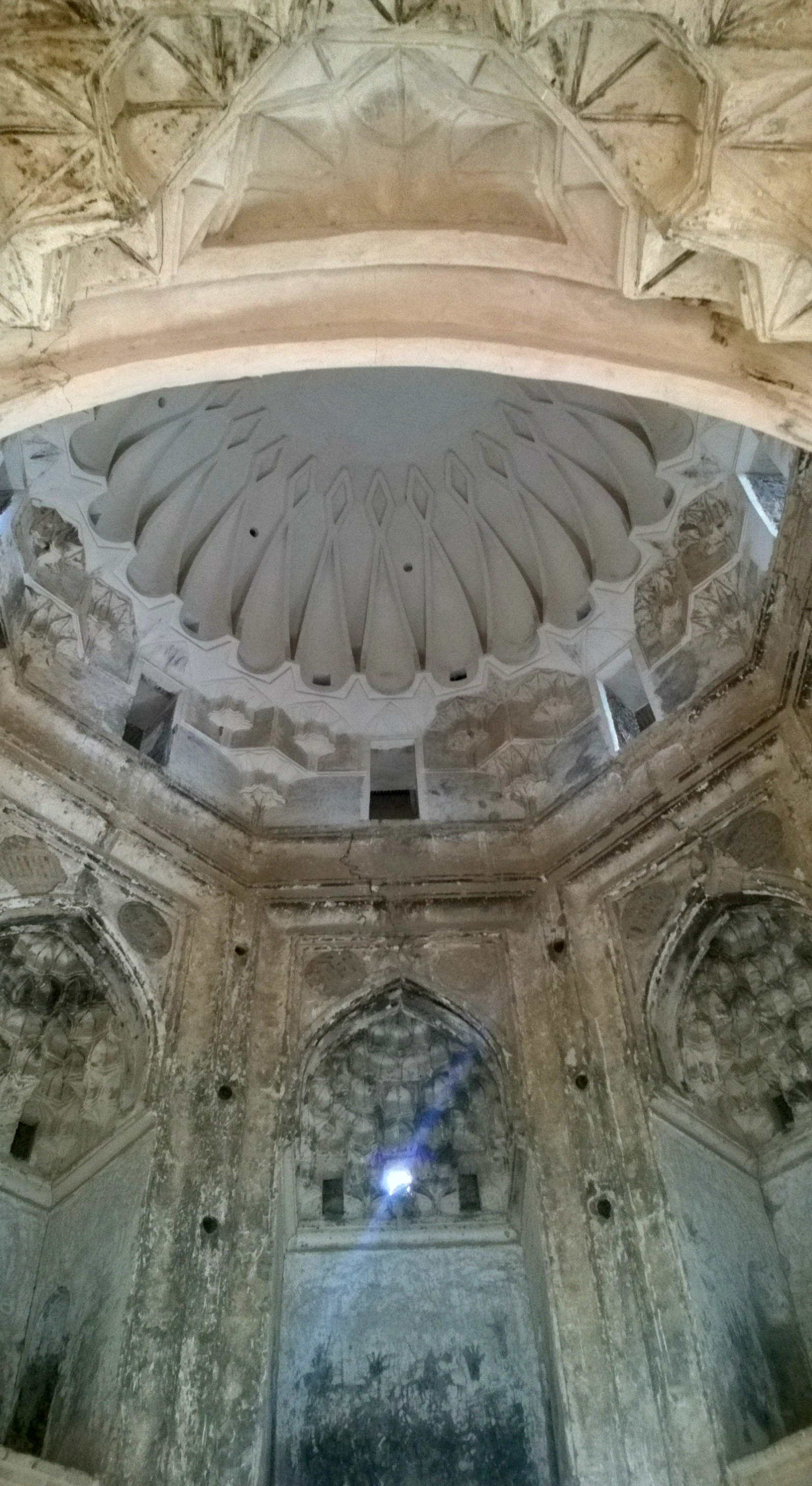
Interior

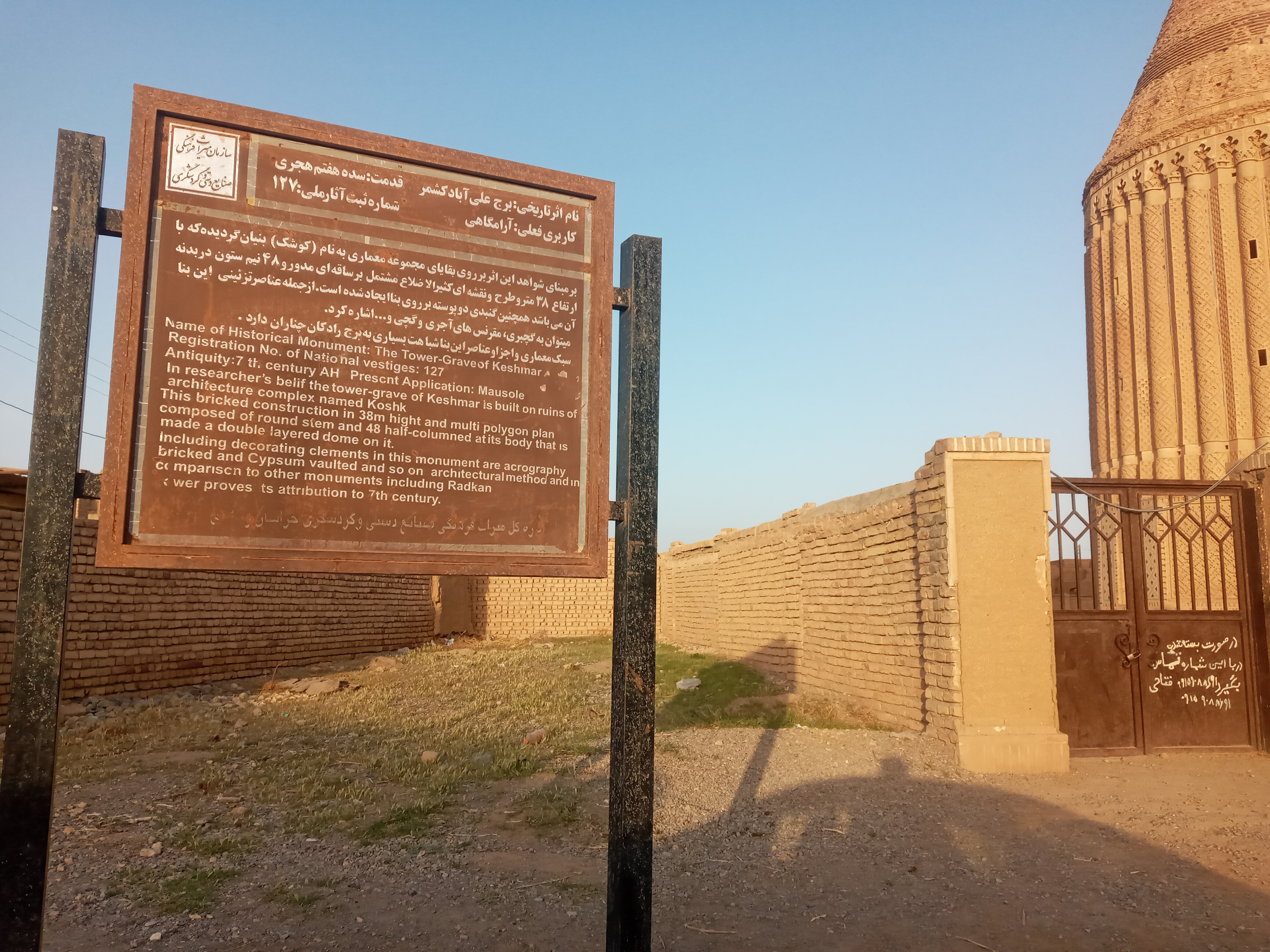
Tower's directory

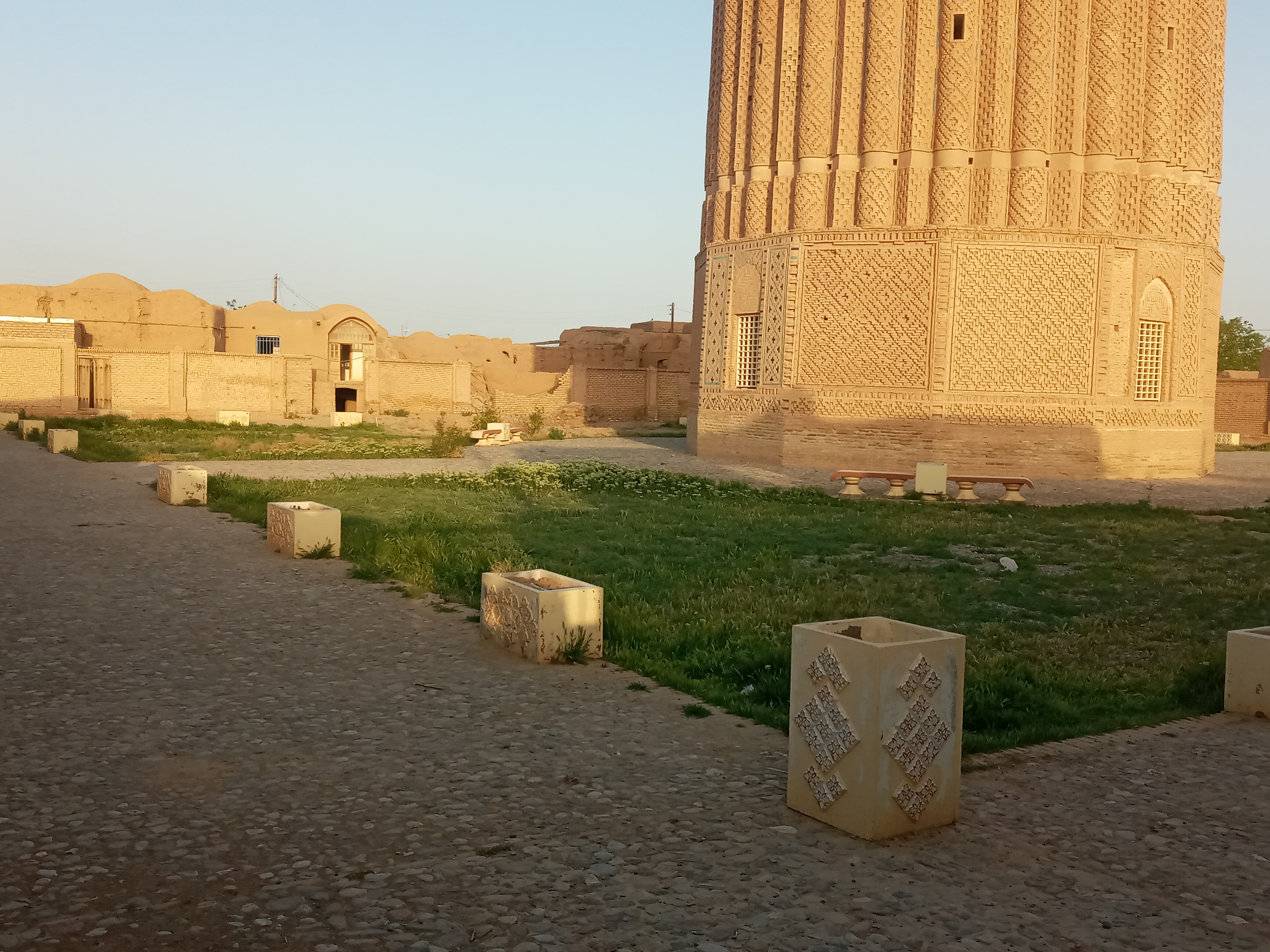
A near view

== See also ==
- Firuzabad Tower
- Seyed Bagher Ab anbar
- Abdolabad Tomb
- Gonbad-e Qabus (tower)
- Aladdin Tower
