= Aliabadak, Bardaskan =

Village in Razavi Khorasan province, Iran

Aliabadak علی‌آبادک
- Village
- Location within Iran
- Coordinates: 35°10′26″N 58°01′37″E
- Country: Iran
- Province: Razavi Khorasan
- County: Bardaskan
- District: Shahrabad
- Rural District: Jolgeh

Population (2016)
  - Total: 534
- Time zone: UTC+3:30 (IRST)

Aliabadak (Persian: علی‌آبادک) (Note: Also romanized as Ali Abadak, ‘Alī Ābādak and Alīābādak; also known as ‘Alīābād) is a village in Jolgeh Rural District of Shahrabad District in Bardaskan County, Razavi Khorasan province, Iran.

== Demographics ==
=== Population ===
At the time of the 2006 National Census, the village's population was 496 in 130 households. The following census in 2011 counted 437 people in 143 households. The 2016 census measured the population of the village as 534 people in 169 households.
