= Shahrabad Rural District (Bardaskan County) =

Rural district in Razavi Khorasan province, Iran

Shahrabad Rural District Persian: دهستان شهرآباد
- Rural District
- Location within Iran
- Coordinates: 35°04′N 57°49′E
- Country: Iran
- Province: Razavi Khorasan
- County: Bardaskan
- District: Shahrabad
- Established: 2004
- Capital: Shahrabad

Population (2016)
  - Total: 9,000
- Time zone: UTC+3:30 (IRST)

Shahrabad Rural District (Persian: دهستان شهرآباد) is in Shahrabad District of Bardaskan County, Razavi Khorasan province, Iran. It is administered from the city of Shahrabad.

== Demographics ==
=== Population ===
At the time of the 2006 National Census, the rural district's population was 10,800 in 2,692 households. There were 8,772 inhabitants in 2,609 households at the following census of 2011. The 2016 census measured the population of the rural district as 9,000 in 2,830 households. The most populous of its 28 villages was Kusheh, with 1,627 people.

=== Other villages in the rural district ===
- Hasanabad
- Jalalabad
- Kazemabad
- Khorramabad
- Mohammadabad
- Rahmaniyeh
- Zangineh
- Zirakabad
