= Aliabadak, Yazd =

Aliabadak علي ابادك
- Village
- Interactive map of Aliabadak
- Country: Iran
- Province: Yazd
- County: Taft
- Bakhsh: Central
- Rural District: Pishkuh

Population (2006)
  - Total: 44
- Time zone: UTC+3:30 (IRST)
  - Summer (DST): UTC+4:30 (IRDT)

Aliabadak (Persian: علي ابادك, romanized: ‘Alīābādak) is a village in Pishkuh Rural District, in the Central District of Taft County, Yazd Province, Iran. At the 2006 census, its population was 44, in 13 families.
