= Rahmanniyeh Castle =

- قلعه رحمانیه
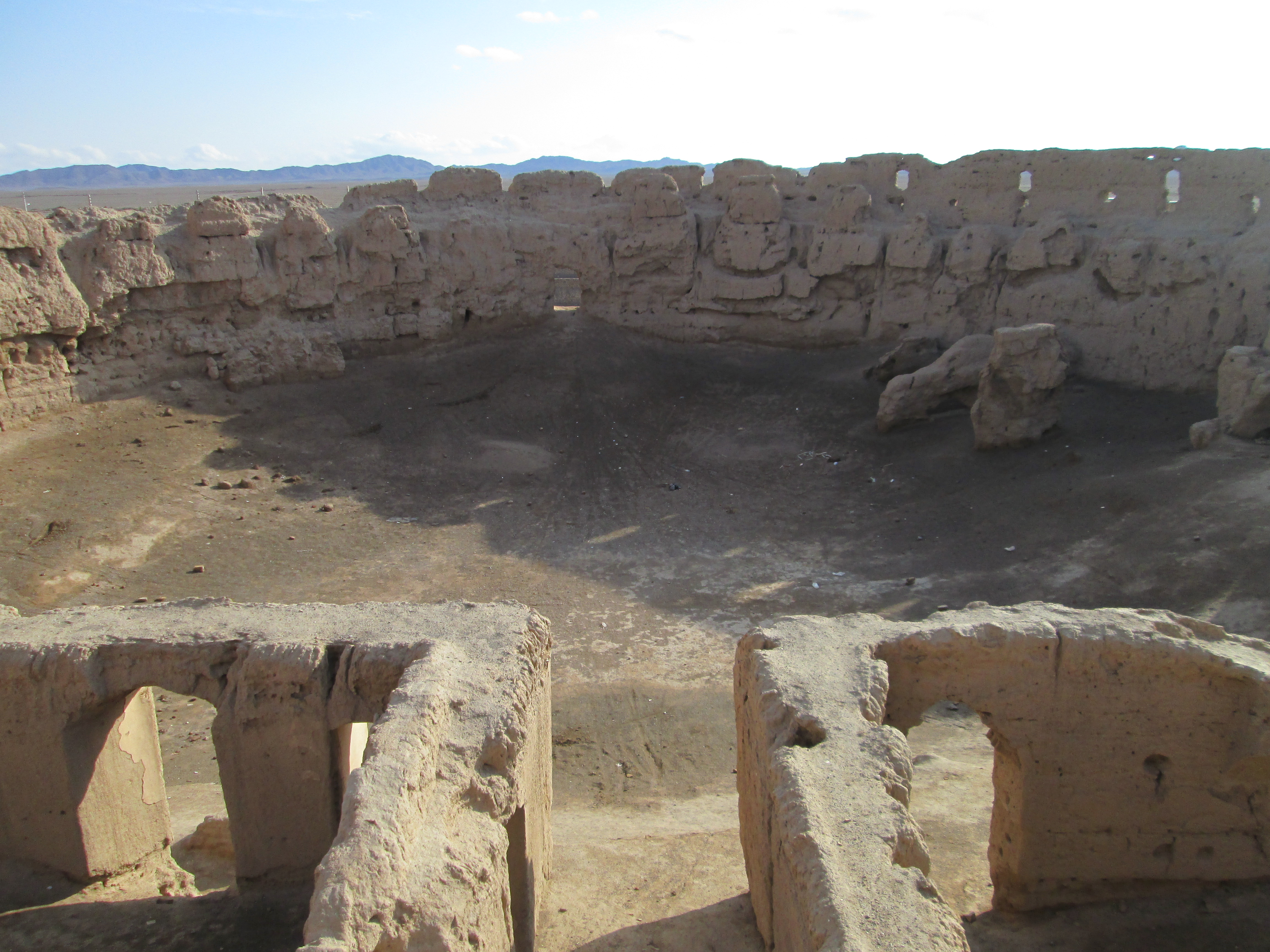
- Interactive map of the Rahmanniyeh Castle area

General information
- Type: Castle
- Location: Bardaskan County, Iran
- Coordinates: 35.0603°N 57.885°E

Rahmanniyeh Castle (Persian: قلعه رحمانیه) is a historical castle located in Bardaskan County in Razavi Khorasan Province, The longevity of this fortress dates back to the 8th to 12th centuries AH.
