= Jolgeh Rural District (Bardaskan County) =

Rural district in Razavi Khorasan province, Iran

Jolgeh Rural District Persian: دهستان جلگه
- Rural District
- Location within Iran
- Coordinates: 35°02′N 57°56′E
- Country: Iran
- Province: Razavi Khorasan
- County: Bardaskan
- District: Shahrabad
- Established: 2004
- Capital: Roknabad

Population (2016)
  - Total: 7,382
- Time zone: UTC+3:30 (IRST)

Jolgeh Rural District (Persian: دهستان جلگه) is in Shahrabad District of Bardaskan County, Razavi Khorasan province, Iran. Its capital is the village of Roknabad.

== Demographics ==
=== Population ===
At the time of the 2006 National Census, the rural district's population was 6,919 in 1,826 households. There were 7,385 inhabitants in 2,163 households at the following census of 2011. The 2016 census measured the population of the rural district as 7,382 in 2,318 households. The most populous of its 23 villages was Roknabad, with 2,039 people.

=== Other villages in the rural district ===
- Abdolabad
- Aliabadak
- Azimabad
- Cheragh Chin
- Firuzabad
- Nasrabad
- Quzhdabad
- Soltanabad
- Zaherabad
