= Shahrabad District =

District in Razavi Khorasan province, Iran

Shahrabad District Persian: بخش شهرآباد
- District
- Location within Iran
- Coordinates: 35°02′N 57°52′E
- Country: Iran
- Province: Razavi Khorasan
- County: Bardaskan
- Established: 2004
- Capital: Shahrabad

Population (2016)
  - Total: 18,465
- Time zone: UTC+3:30 (IRST)

Shahrabad District (Persian: بخش شهرآباد) is in Bardaskan County, Razavi Khorasan province, Iran. Its capital is the city of Shahrabad.

== History ==
The village of Shahrabad was converted to a city in 2009.

== Demographics ==
=== Population ===
At the time of the 2006 National Census, the district's population was 17,719 in 4,518 households. The following census in 2011 counted 18,412 people in 5,353 households. The 2016 census measured the population of the district as 18,465 inhabitants in 5,792 households.

=== Administrative divisions ===
Shahrabad District Population
Administrative Divisions	2006	2011	2016
Jolgeh RD	6,919	7,385	7,382
Shahrabad RD	10,800	8,772	9,000
Shahrabad (city)		2,255	2,083
Total	17,719	18,412	18,465
RD = Rural District
