= Dahan Qaleh =

Dahan Qaleh دهن قلعه
- Village
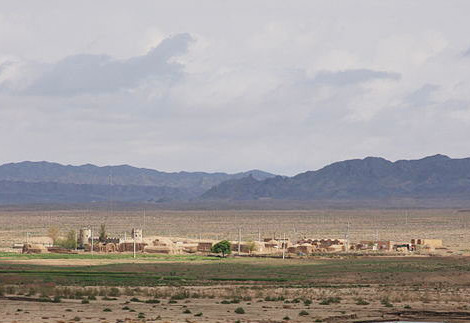
- Dahan Qaleh

- Location within Iran
- Coordinates: 35°18′57″N 57°38′34″E
- Country: Iran
- Province: Razavi Khorasan
- County: Bardaskan
- Bakhsh: Anabad
- Rural District: Doruneh

Population (2006)
  - Total: 16
- Time zone: UTC+3:30 (IRST)
  - Summer (DST): UTC+4:30 (IRDT)

Dahan Qaleh (Persian: دهن قلعه, also Romanized as Dahan Qal‘eh and Dahān Qal‘eh; also known as Gūshḵū-ye ‘Olyā (Persian: گوشكوعليا), Dehāneh Qal‘eh, and Dahāneh Qal‘eh) is a village in Doruneh Rural District, Anabad District, Bardaskan County, Razavi Khorasan Province, Iran. At the 2006 census, its population was 16, in 4 families.
