= Anabad =

Anabad may refer to:

- Anabad, Azerbaijan, a village in Nakhchivan, Azerbaijan
- Anabad District, a district of Iran
- Anabad, Iran, the capital of Anabad District
