= Cheshmeh Hadi =

Coordinates: 35°25′54″N 57°38′31″E

Cheshmeh Hadi چشمه هادي
- Village
- Interactive map of Cheshmeh Hadi
- Country: Iran
- Province: Razavi Khorasan
- County: Bardaskan
- Bakhsh: Anabad
- Rural District: Doruneh

Population (2006)
  - Total: 123
- Time zone: UTC+3:30 (IRST)
  - Summer (DST): UTC+4:30 (IRDT)

Cheshmeh Hadi (Persian: چشمه هادي, also Romanized as Cheshmeh Hādī) is a village in Doruneh Rural District, Anabad District, Bardaskan County, Razavi Khorasan Province, Iran. At the 2006 census, its population was 123, in 24 families.
