= Kalateh Najaf =

Kalateh-ye Najaf كلاته نجف
- Village
- Location within Iran
- Coordinates: 35°19′50″N 57°36′25″E
- Country: Iran
- Province: Razavi Khorasan
- County: Bardaskan
- Bakhsh: Anabad
- Rural District: Doruneh

Population (2006)
  - Total: 31
- Time zone: UTC+3:30 (IRST)
  - Summer (DST): UTC+4:30 (IRDT)

Kalateh-ye Najaf (Persian: كلاته نجف, also Romanized as Kalāteh-ye Najaf; also known as Kalāteh-ye Najafābād) is a village in Doruneh Rural District, Anabad District, Bardaskan County, Razavi Khorasan Province, in Northeast Iran. At the 2006 census, its population was 31, in 8 families.
