= Balaju =

Balaju بالاجو
- Village
- Location within Iran
- Coordinates: 35°18′00″N 57°33′00″E
- Country: Iran
- Province: Razavi Khorasan
- County: Bardaskan
- Bakhsh: Anabad
- Rural District: Doruneh

Population (2006)
  - Total: 22
- Time zone: UTC+3:30 (IRST)
  - Summer (DST): UTC+4:30 (IRDT)

Balaju (Persian: بالاجو, also Romanized as Bālājū; also known as Bālājūn) is a village in Doruneh Rural District, Anabad District, Bardaskan County, Razavi Khorasan Province, Iran. At the 2006 census, its population was 22, in 4 families.

== See also ==
- List of cities, towns and villages in Razavi Khorasan Province
