= Kalateh Jomeh =

Kalateh-ye Jomeh كلاته جمعه
- Village
- Location within Iran
- Coordinates: 35°19′46″N 57°47′50″E
- Country: Iran
- Province: Razavi Khorasan
- County: Bardaskan
- Bakhsh: Anabad
- Rural District: Sahra

Population (2006)
  - Total: 90
- Time zone: UTC+3:30 (IRST)
  - Summer (DST): UTC+4:30 (IRDT)

Kalateh-ye Jomeh (Persian: كلاته جمعه, also Romanized as Kalāteh-ye Jom‘eh) is a village in Sahra Rural District, Anabad District, Bardaskan County, Razavi Khorasan Province, Iran. At the 2006 census, its population was 90, in 24 families.
