= Kalateh-ye Gazbalaki =

Kalateh-ye Gazbalaki كلاته گزبلكي
- Village
- Interactive map of Kalateh-ye Gazbalaki
- Country: Iran
- Province: Razavi Khorasan
- County: Bardaskan
- Bakhsh: Anabad
- Rural District: Doruneh

Population (2006)
  - Total: 43
- Time zone: UTC+3:30 (IRST)
  - Summer (DST): UTC+4:30 (IRDT)

Kalateh-ye Gazbalaki (Persian: كلاته گزبلكي, also Romanized as Kalāteh-ye Gazbalaḵī) is a village in Doruneh Rural District, Anabad District, Bardaskan County, Razavi Khorasan Province, Iran. At the 2006 census, its population was 43, in 8 families.
