= Ali Palang =

Ali Palang علي پلنگ
- Village
- Location within Iran
- Coordinates: 35°18′48″N 57°33′45″E
- Country: Iran
- Province: Razavi Khorasan
- County: Bardaskan
- Bakhsh: Anabad
- Rural District: Doruneh

Population (2006)
  - Total: 24
- Time zone: UTC+3:30 (IRST)
  - Summer (DST): UTC+4:30 (IRDT)

Ali Palang (Persian: علي پلنگ, also Romanized as ‘Alī Palang) is a village in Doruneh Rural District, Anabad District, Bardaskan County, Razavi Khorasan Province, Iran. At the 2006 census, its population was 24, in 6 families.

== See also ==
- List of cities, towns and villages in Razavi Khorasan Province
