= Shalaqeh =

Shalaqeh شلاقه
- Village
- Location within Iran
- Coordinates: 35°19′12″N 57°34′37″E
- Country: Iran
- Province: Razavi Khorasan
- County: Bardaskan
- Bakhsh: Anabad
- Rural District: Doruneh

Population (2006)
  - Total: 40
- Time zone: UTC+3:30 (IRST)
  - Summer (DST): UTC+4:30 (IRDT)

Shalaqeh (Persian: شلاقه, also Romanized as Shalāqeh) is a village in Doruneh Rural District, Anabad District, Bardaskan County, Razavi Khorasan Province, Iran. At the 2006 census, its population was 40, in 9 families.
