= Cheshmeh Ney =

Cheshmeh Ney چشمه ني
- Village
- Location within Iran
- Coordinates: 35°24′52″N 57°23′08″E
- Country: Iran
- Province: Razavi Khorasan
- County: Bardaskan
- Bakhsh: Anabad
- Rural District: Doruneh

Population (2006)
  - Total: 51
- Time zone: UTC+3:30 (IRST)
  - Summer (DST): UTC+4:30 (IRDT)

Cheshmeh Ney (Persian: چشمه ني) is a village in Doruneh Rural District, Anabad District, Bardaskan County, Razavi Khorasan Province, Iran. At the 2006 census, its population was 51, in 12 families.
