= Ali Beyk =

Ali Beyk علي بيك
- Village
- Location within Iran
- Coordinates: 35°17′59″N 57°45′32″E
- Country: Iran
- Province: Razavi Khorasan
- County: Bardaskan
- Bakhsh: Anabad
- Rural District: Sahra

Population (2006)
  - Total: 149
- Time zone: UTC+3:30 (IRST)
  - Summer (DST): UTC+4:30 (IRDT)

Ali Beyk (Persian: علي بيك, also Romanized as ‘Alī Beyk and ‘Alī Beyg) is a village in Sahra Rural District, Anabad District, Bardaskan County, Razavi Khorasan Province, Iran. At the 2006 census, its population was 149, in 37 families.
