= Zura =

Zura or Zur'a may refer to:

== People with the given name Zura ==
- Zura Barayeva (died 2002), a Chechen participant in the Moscow theater hostage crisis
- Zura Begum, a Union of Burma legislator and member of the Burmese parliament in the 1950s
- Zura Bitiyeva (1948–2003), a Chechen human rights activist, assassinated in 2003
- Zura Karuhimbi (1925–2018), a Rwandan humanitarian
- Zura Tkemaladze (born 2000), a Georgian tennis player

== People with the surname Zura ==
- Abu Zurʽa al-Razi (died 878), an Iranian Muslim scholar
- Edmundo Zura (born 1983), an Ecuadorian footballer
- Ibn Zur'a (943–1008), a philosopher in Baghdad

== Other uses ==
- Zura, Afghanistan, a village in Balkh Province
- Zura, Russia, a village in Udmurtia
- Zura, a language related to the Enya language of the Democratic Republic of the Congo
- Moḩammad Zūrā, a village in Iran
- Ercheia zura, also known as Ercheia diversipennis, a species of moth
- Żura, Polish name for Jura, Transnistria, village in Moldova

== See also ==
- Zuras, a Marvel comics character
