= Mozaffarabad, Bardaskan =

Village in Razavi Khorasan province, Iran

Mozaffarabad مظفرآباد
- Village
- Location within Iran
- Coordinates: 35°14′40″N 57°50′30″E
- Country: Iran
- Province: Razavi Khorasan
- County: Bardaskan
- District: Anabad
- Rural District: Sahra

Population (2016)
  - Total: 1,524
- Time zone: UTC+3:30 (IRST)

Mozaffarabad (Persian: مظفرآباد) (Note: Also romanized as Moz̧affarābād) is a village in Sahra Rural District of Anabad District in Bardaskan County, Razavi Khorasan province, Iran.

== Demographics ==
=== Population ===
At the time of the 2006 National Census, the village's population was 1,437 in 359 households. The following census in 2011 counted 1,490 people in 414 households. The 2016 census measured the population of the village as 1,524 people in 464 households, the most populous in its rural district.
