= Zamanabad, Bardaskan =

Village in Razavi Khorasan province, Iran

Zamanabad زمان اباد
- Village
- Location within Iran
- Coordinates: 35°10′53″N 57°49′15″E
- Country: Iran
- Province: Razavi Khorasan
- County: Bardaskan
- District: Anabad
- Rural District: Sahra

Population (2016)
  - Total: 516
- Time zone: UTC+3:30 (IRST)

Zamanabad (Persian: زمان اباد) (Note: Also romanized as Zamānābād) is a village in Sahra Rural District of Anabad District in Bardaskan County, Razavi Khorasan province, Iran.

== Demographics ==
=== Population ===
At the time of the 2006 National Census, the village's population was 463 in 115 households. The following census in 2011 counted 389 people in 108 households. The 2016 census measured the population of the village as 516 people in 146 households.
