= Eslamabad, Bardaskan =

Village in Razavi Khorasan province, Iran

Eslamabad اسلام اباد
- Village
- Location within Iran
- Coordinates: 35°10′55″N 57°51′05″E
- Country: Iran
- Province: Razavi Khorasan
- County: Bardaskan
- District: Anabad
- Rural District: Sahra

Population (2016)
  - Total: 1,199
- Time zone: UTC+3:30 (IRST)

Eslamabad (Persian: اسلام اباد) (Note: Also romanized as Eslāmābād; formerly known as Shāhrokhābād (شاهرخ اباد)) is a village in Sahra Rural District of Anabad District in Bardaskan County, Razavi Khorasan province, Iran.

== Demographics ==
=== Population ===
At the time of the 2006 National Census, the village's population was 1,099 in 284 households. The following census in 2011 counted 1,123 people in 335 households. The 2016 census measured the population of the village as 1,199 people in 347 households.
