= Cheshmeh-ye Hajji Soleyman =

Village in Razavi Khorasan province, Iran

Cheshmeh-ye Hajji Soleyman Persian: چشمه حاجي سليمان
- Village
- Location within Iran
- Coordinates: 35°18′48″N 57°37′58″E
- Country: Iran
- Province: Razavi Khorasan
- County: Bardaskan
- District: Anabad
- Rural District: Doruneh

Population (2016)
  - Total: 189
- Time zone: UTC+3:30 (IRST)

Cheshmeh-ye Hajji Soleyman (Persian: چشمه حاجي سليمان) (Note: Also romanized as Cheshmeh-ye Ḩājjī Soleymān; also known as Cheshmeh-ye Soleymān and Cheshmeh) is a village in Doruneh Rural District of Anabad District in Bardaskan County, Razavi Khorasan province, Iran.

== Demographics ==
=== Population ===
At the time of the 2006 National Census, the village's population was 186 in 43 households. The following census in 2011 counted 187 people in 54 households. The 2016 census measured the population of the village as 189 people in 56 households.
