= Ansariyeh, Razavi Khorasan =

Coordinates: 36°40′12″N 48°30′45″E

Chah-e Dasht Mohammad Khan 6 چاه دشت محمدخان 6
- Village
- Interactive map of Chah-e Dasht Mohammad Khan 6
- Country: Iran
- Province: Razavi Khorasan
- County: Bardaskan
- Bakhsh: Anabad
- Rural District: Sahra

Population (2006)
  - Total: 17
- Time zone: UTC+3:30 (IRST)
  - Summer (DST): UTC+4:30 (IRDT)

Chah-e Dasht Mohammad Khan 6 (Persian: چاه دشت محمدخان 6, also Romanized as Chāh-e Dasht Moḩammad Khān 6; also known as Ānṣārīyeh) is a village in Sahra Rural District, Anabad District, Bardaskan County, Razavi Khorasan Province, Iran. At the 2006 census, its population was 17, in 5 families.
