= Hoseynabad-e Mahlar-e Olya =

Hoseynabad-e Mahlar-e Olya حسين ابادمهلارعليا
- Village
- Location within Iran
- Coordinates: 35°11′28″N 57°32′25″E
- Country: Iran
- Province: Razavi Khorasan
- County: Bardaskan
- Bakhsh: Anabad
- Rural District: Doruneh

Population (2006)
  - Total: 121
- Time zone: UTC+3:30 (IRST)
  - Summer (DST): UTC+4:30 (IRDT)

Hoseynabad-e Mahlar-e Olya (Persian: حسين ابادمهلارعليا, also Romanized as Ḩoseynābād-e Mahlār-e ‘Olyā; also known as Ḩoseynābād-e Mohlār-e ‘Olyā) is a village in Doruneh Rural District, Anabad District, Bardaskan County, Razavi Khorasan Province, Iran. At the 2006 census, its population was 121, in 28 families.
