= Salehiyeh, Razavi Khorasan =

Village in Razavi Khorasan province, Iran

Salehiyeh Persian: صالحيه
- Village
- Location within Iran
- Coordinates: 35°08′21″N 57°23′12″E
- Country: Iran
- Province: Razavi Khorasan
- County: Bardaskan
- District: Anabad
- Rural District: Doruneh

Population (2016)
  - Total: 206
- Time zone: UTC+3:30 (IRST)

Salehiyeh (Persian: صالحيه) (Note: Also romanized as Şāleḩīyeh) is a village in Doruneh Rural District of Anabad District in Bardaskan County, Razavi Khorasan province, Iran.

== Demographics ==
=== Population ===
At the time of the 2006 National Census, the village's population was 167 in 38 households. The following census in 2011 counted 181 people in 51 households. The 2016 census measured the population of the village as 206 people in 66 households.
