= Kalateh-ye Baraq-e Olya =

Village in Razavi Khorasan province, Iran

Kalateh-ye Baraq-e Olya Persian: كلاته برق عليا
- Village
- Location within Iran
- Coordinates: 35°12′53″N 57°20′24″E
- Country: Iran
- Province: Razavi Khorasan
- County: Bardaskan
- District: Anabad
- Rural District: Doruneh

Population (2016)
  - Total: 181
- Time zone: UTC+3:30 (IRST)

Kalateh-ye Baraq-e Olya (Persian: كلاته برق عليا) (Note: Also romanized as Kalāteh-ye Baraq-e ‘Olyā) is a village in Doruneh Rural District of Anabad District in Bardaskan County, Razavi Khorasan province, Iran.

== Demographics ==
=== Population ===
At the time of the 2006 National Census, the village's population was 153 in 37 households. The following census in 2011 counted 205 people in 61 households. The 2016 census measured the population of the village as 181 people in 57 households.
