= Anser =

Anser is a genus of geese.

Anser may also refer to:

== People ==
- Anser (poet), poet of ancient Rome

== Other uses ==
- ANSER (organization), a non-profit research organization in Virginia
- Anser (putter), a model of golf club made by Ping
- Anser Island, in Victoria, Australia
- ACME Anser, an amphibious jet fighter project of the 1950s
- Anser, the proper name of the star Alpha Vulpeculae
- Argonne–Northwestern Solar Energy Research Center
- Sega Mega Anser, a Sega Mega Drive accessory

== See also ==
- Ansar (disambiguation)
- Answer (disambiguation)
