= Doruneh, Bardaskan =

Village in Razavi Khorasan province, Iran

Doruneh Persian: درونه
- Village

- Location within Iran
- Coordinates: 35°10′42″N 57°24′57″E
- Country: Iran
- Province: Razavi Khorasan
- County: Bardaskan
- District: Anabad
- Rural District: Doruneh

Population (2016)
  - Total: 1,603
- Time zone: UTC+3:30 (IRST)

Doruneh (Persian: درونه) (Note: Also romanized as Darooneh, Daruneh, and Dorūneh; also known as Dowrūnā and Durūna) is a village in, and the capital of, Doruneh Rural District in Anabad District of Bardaskan County, Razavi Khorasan province, Iran.

== Demographics ==
=== Population ===
At the time of the 2006 National Census, the village's population was 1,569 in 393 households. The following census in 2011 counted 1,580 people in 454 households. The 2016 census measured the population of the village as 1,603 people in 498 households, the most populous in its rural district.
