= Hoseynabad-e Mahlar =

Hoseynabad-e Mahlar or Hoseynabad-e Mohlar (Persian: حسين ابادمهلارعليا) may refer to:

- Hoseynabad-e Mahlar-e Olya
- Hoseynabad-e Mahlar-e Sofla
