= Shariatabad, Razavi Khorasan =

Shariatabad شريعت اباد
- Village
- Location within Iran
- Coordinates: 35°12′04″N 57°47′22″E
- Country: Iran
- Province: Razavi Khorasan
- County: Bardaskan
- Bakhsh: Anabad
- Rural District: Sahra

Population (2006)
  - Total: 82
- Time zone: UTC+3:30 (IRST)
  - Summer (DST): UTC+4:30 (IRDT)

Shariatabad (Persian: شريعت اباد, also Romanized as Sharī‘atābād; also known as Ḩoseynābād) is a village in Sahra Rural District, Anabad District, Bardaskan County, Razavi Khorasan Province, Iran. At the 2006 census, its population was 82, in 16 families.
