= Bab ol Hakam =

Village in Razavi Khorasan province, Iran

Bab ol Hakam باب الحكم
- Village
- Location within Iran
- Coordinates: 35°15′11″N 57°54′01″E
- Country: Iran
- Province: Razavi Khorasan
- County: Bardaskan
- District: Anabad
- Rural District: Sahra

Population (2016)
  - Total: 927
- Time zone: UTC+3:30 (IRST)

Bab ol Hakam (Persian: باب الحكم) (Note: Also romanized as Bab al Hakam, Bāb al Ḩakam, Bāb ol Ḩakam, and Bāb ol Ḩokm; also known as Bāb ol Ḩakīm and Bāba Lu Hakim) is a village in Sahra Rural District of Anabad District in Bardaskan County, Razavi Khorasan province, Iran.

== Demographics ==
=== Population ===
At the time of the 2006 National Census, the village's population was 957 in 267 households. The following census in 2011 counted 967 people in 295 households. The 2016 census measured the population of the village as 927 people in 302 households.
