= Rasan, Razavi Khorasan =

Village in Razavi Khorasan province, Iran

Rasan Persian: رسن
- Village
- Location within Iran
- Coordinates: 35°09′36″N 57°14′37″E
- Country: Iran
- Province: Razavi Khorasan
- County: Bardaskan
- District: Anabad
- Rural District: Doruneh

Population (2016)
  - Total: 163
- Time zone: UTC+3:30 (IRST)

Rasan (Persian: رسن) is a village in Doruneh Rural District of Anabad District in Bardaskan County, Razavi Khorasan province, Iran.

== Demographics ==
=== Population ===
At the time of the 2006 National Census, the village's population was 147 in 35 households. The following census in 2011 counted 156 people in 39 households. The 2016 census measured the population of the village as 163 people in 48 households.
