= Chah Mejeng =

Village in Razavi Khorasan province, Iran

Chah Mejeng Persian: چاه مجنگ
- Village
- Location within Iran
- Coordinates: 35°13′51″N 57°36′33″E
- Country: Iran
- Province: Razavi Khorasan
- County: Bardaskan
- District: Anabad
- Rural District: Doruneh

Population (2016)
  - Total: 150
- Time zone: UTC+3:30 (IRST)

Chah Mejeng (Persian: چاه مجنگ) (Note: Also romanized as Chāh Mejeng; also known as Chāh Majīn and Chāh Mechang) is a village in Doruneh Rural District of Anabad District in Bardaskan County, Razavi Khorasan province, Iran.

== Demographics ==
=== Population ===
At the time of the 2006 National Census, the village's population was 128 in 32 households. The following census in 2011 counted 188 people in 52 households. The 2016 census measured the population of the village as 150 people in 42 households.
