= Mohammad Zurab =

Mohammad Zurab محمدزوراب
- Village
- Location within Iran
- Coordinates: 35°28′15″N 57°29′53″E
- Country: Iran
- Province: Razavi Khorasan
- County: Bardaskan
- Bakhsh: Anabad
- Rural District: Doruneh

Population (2006)
  - Total: 122
- Time zone: UTC+3:30 (IRST)
  - Summer (DST): UTC+4:30 (IRDT)

Mohammad Zurab (Persian: محمدزوراب, also Romanized as Moḩammad Zūrāb; also known as Moḩammad Zūrā) is a village in Doruneh Rural District, Anabad District, Bardaskan County, Razavi Khorasan Province, Iran. At the 2006 census, its population was 122, in 27 families.
