= Ebrahimabad, Bardaskan =

Village in Razavi Khorasan province, Iran

Ebrahimabad ابراهيم اباد
- Village
- Location within Iran
- Coordinates: 35°15′07″N 57°55′02″E
- Country: Iran
- Province: Razavi Khorasan
- County: Bardaskan
- District: Anabad
- Rural District: Sahra

Population (2016)
  - Total: 1,070
- Time zone: UTC+3:30 (IRST)

Ebrahimabad (Persian: ابراهيم اباد) (Note: Also romanized as Ebrāhīmābād) is a village in Sahra Rural District of Anabad District in Bardaskan County, Razavi Khorasan province, Iran.

== Demographics ==
=== Population ===
At the time of the 2006 National Census, the village's population was 948 in 237 households. The following census in 2011 counted 1,007 people in 305 households. The 2016 census measured the population of the village as 1,070 people in 338 households.
