= Marandiz =

Marandiz (Persian: مارانديز) may refer to:

- Marandiz, Bajestan
- Marandiz, Bardaskan
