= Ansar =

Ansar, Al Ansar, or Al-Ansar may refer to:

== Organizations ==
=== Religious groups ===
- Ansar (Islam), citizens from Medina who helped Muhammad
- Ansar (Sudan), a Sufi religious movement in the Sudan

=== Military group ===
- Al-Ansar (Iraq), a Communist guerrilla group in Iraq active from 1979 to 1988
- Ansar Brigade, a Syrian rebel group
- Bangladesh Ansar, an internal security force in Bangladesh

== People ==
- Ansar Burney, Pakistani-Arab human rights activist (b. 1956)

== Places ==
=== Iran ===
- Ansar, Hamadan, a village in Hamadan Province, Iran
- Ansar, North Khorasan, a village in North Khorasan Province, Iran
- Ansar Rural District, in West Azerbaijan Province, Iran

=== Other places ===
- Ansar, Siwan, India
- Ansar, Kazakhstan, a rural locality in Akmola Region
- Ansar, Lebanon, a village in south Lebanon

== Sports teams ==
- Al Ansar FC, a Lebanese association football team
  - Al Ansar FC (women), a defunct Lebanese women's association football team
- Al Ansar Club (Libya), a Libyan association football team
- Al-Ansar FC (Medina), a Saudi Arabian association football club
- Al-Ansar (Saudi Arabia, basketball), a Saudi Arabian basketball team
- Ansar Howara SC, a Lebanese association football team
- Ansar Al Mawadda SC, a Lebanese association football team

== Other uses ==
- Anshar, also spelt Anšar, an ancient Babylonian sky god

== See also ==
- Ansar Allah, also known as the Houthis
- Ansar Allah (disambiguation)
- Ansar al-Islam, a Sunni Islamist group of Iraqis promoting a radical interpretation of Islam
- Ansar al-Sharia, a number of Islamist groups active in the Arab world
- Ansar-e Hezbollah, a militant conservative Islamic group in Iran
- Ansar al-Sunna (Mozambique), an Islamist militant group active in Cabo Delgado Province, Mozambique
- Ansar Dine, a Tuareg Islamist group, accused of having links with Al-Qaeda in the Islamic Maghreb and other Islamist groups
- Ansari (disambiguation)
- Ansaru, a Nigerian Islamist group, in conflict with the Nigerian state
- Ansarullah (Ahmadiyya), an auxiliary organization of the Ahmadiyya Muslim Community
- Anser (disambiguation)
- Jamaat Ansar al-Sunna, an Iraqi Sunni insurgent group that fought against US Troops and their local allies during the Iraq War
- Nuwaubian Nation, formerly the Ansaaru Allah Community, a black nationalist group in the US
