= Shariatabad =

Shariatabad (Persian: شريعت اباد) may refer to:

- Shariatabad, Amol, Mazandaran Province
- Shariatabad, Nowshahr, Mazandaran Province
- Shariatabad, Razavi Khorasan
