= Hoseynabad-e Mahlar-e Sofla =

Village in Razavi Khorasan province, Iran

Hoseynabad-e Mahlar-e Sofla Persian: حسين ابادمهلارسفلي
- Village
- Location within Iran
- Coordinates: 35°11′10″N 57°30′27″E
- Country: Iran
- Province: Razavi Khorasan
- County: Bardaskan
- District: Anabad
- Rural District: Doruneh

Population (2016)
  - Total: 188
- Time zone: UTC+3:30 (IRST)

Hoseynabad-e Mahlar-e Sofla (Persian: حسين ابادمهلارسفلي) (Note: Also romanized as Ḩoseynābād-e Mahlār-e Soflá) is a village in Doruneh Rural District of Anabad District in Bardaskan County, Razavi Khorasan province, Iran.

== Demographics ==
=== Population ===
At the time of the 2006 National Census, the village's population was 120 in 27 households. The following census in 2011 counted 155 people in 42 households. The 2016 census measured the population of the village as 188 people in 57 households.
