= Hatiteh, Bardaskan =

Village in Razavi Khorasan province, Iran

Hatiteh حطيطه
- Village
- Location within Iran
- Coordinates: 35°11′19″N 57°52′49″E
- Country: Iran
- Province: Razavi Khorasan
- County: Bardaskan
- District: Anabad
- Rural District: Sahra

Population (2016)
  - Total: 936
- Time zone: UTC+3:30 (IRST)

Hatiteh (Persian: حطيطه) (Note: Also romanized as Ḩaţīţeh) is a village in Sahra Rural District of Anabad District in Bardaskan County, Razavi Khorasan province, Iran.

== Demographics ==
=== Population ===
At the time of the 2006 National Census, the village's population was 930 in 225 households. The following census in 2011 counted 964 people in 280 households. The 2016 census measured the population of the village as 936 people in 288 households.
