= Ansar Allah (disambiguation) =

Ansar Allah or Ansarullah (anṣāru llāhi أنصار الله) is the Arabic for "Helpers/Supporters of God". It may refer to:

- the Houthi movement in Yemen
- Jamaat Ansarullah, a Tajik jihadist group in Afghanistan
- Ansarullah (Ahmadiyya), an Ahmadiyya auxiliary organisation
- Ansaaru Allah or Nuwaubian Nation, an alternative name of an "Egyptian themed" black nationalist group
- Jund Ansar Allah, an armed Palestinian Islamist organization operating in the Gaza Strip
- Ansar Allah (Lebanon) a Palestinian Islamist organization with ties to Hezbollah operating in South America

== See also ==
- Ansar (Islam), historically the "helpers" in Medina who accommodated the early Muslim migrants (including Muhammad) who fled persecution in Mecca
- Ansari (nisbat)
- Ansar (disambiguation)
- Ansari (disambiguation)
