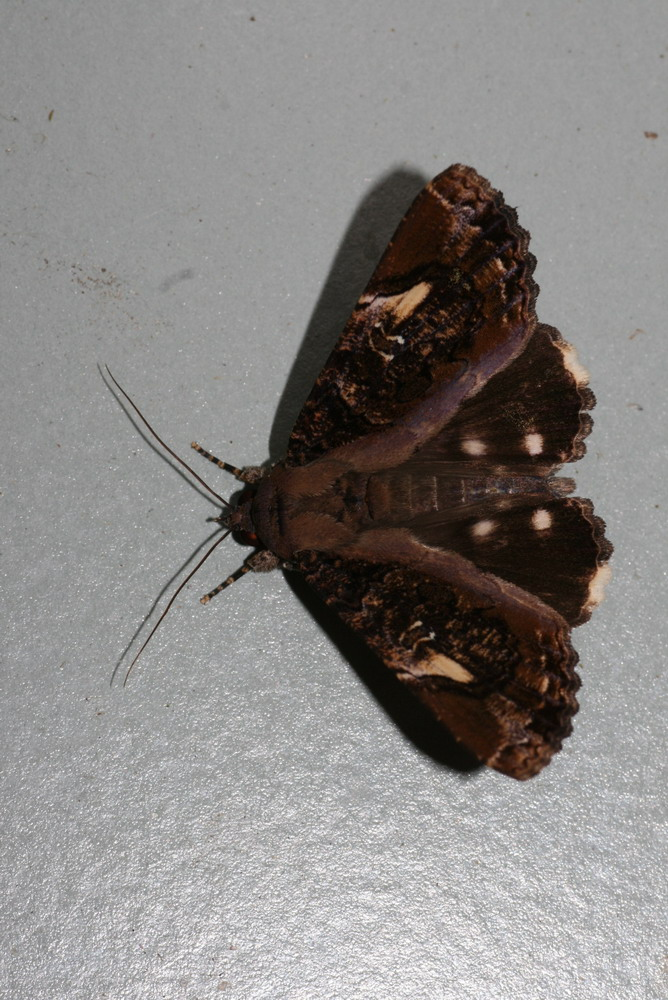

Scientific classification
- Kingdom: Animalia
- Phylum: Arthropoda
- Class: Insecta
- Order: Lepidoptera
- Superfamily: Noctuoidea
- Family: Erebidae
- Genus: Ercheia
- Species: E. pulchrivenula

Binomial name
- Ercheia pulchrivenula Gaede, 1938

= Ercheia pulchrivenula =

Species of moth

Ercheia pulchrivenula is a species of moth of the family Erebidae.

== Distribution ==
It is found in Thailand, Peninsular Malaysia, Sumatra and Borneo.

The species has been treated erroneously as a synonym of Ercheia pulchrivena by many authors.
