= Hatiteh =

Hatiteh (Persian: حطيطه) may refer to:

- Hatiteh, Bardaskan
- Hatiteh, Joghatai
