= Marandiz, Bardaskan =

Village in Razavi Khorasan province, Iran

Marandiz مارنديز
- Village
- Location within Iran
- Coordinates: 35°13′10″N 57°49′50″E
- Country: Iran
- Province: Razavi Khorasan
- County: Bardaskan
- District: Anabad
- Rural District: Sahra

Population (2016)
  - Total: 733
- Time zone: UTC+3:30 (IRST)

Marandiz (Persian: مارنديز) (Note: Also romanized as Mārandīz; also known as Mār Āndīz (مارانديز)) is a village in Sahra Rural District of Anabad District in Bardaskan County, Razavi Khorasan province, Iran.

== Demographics ==
=== Population ===
At the time of the 2006 National Census, the village's population was 651 in 162 households. The following census in 2011 counted 675 people in 189 households. The 2016 census measured the population of the village as 733 people in 220 households.
