= Asari =

Asari may refer to:

== Fiction ==
- Asari (Mass Effect), a fictional race in the video game series Mass Effect
- Asari-chan, a Japanese manga series by Mayumi Muroyama

== Places ==
- Asari (crater), on the dwarf planet Ceres
- Asari, Latvia, a neighbourhood of Jūrmala, Latvia
- Asari-Toru, a Rivers State, Nigeria

== People ==
- Junko Asari (born 1969), a Japanese marathon runner
- Masakatsu Asari (浅利 正勝; born 1945), Japanese ski jumper
- Satoru Asari (born 1974), former Japanese football player
- Yosuke Asari (born 1987), Japanese actor
- Mujahid Dokubo-Asari, jailed leader of the Niger Delta People's Volunteer Force

== Other uses ==
- Asari, the Japanese term for the saltwater clam species Venerupis philippinarum
- Asari, a Hindu caste usually grouped with the Vishwakarma

== See also ==
- Ansari (disambiguation)
