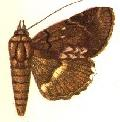

Scientific classification
- Kingdom: Animalia
- Phylum: Arthropoda
- Class: Insecta
- Order: Lepidoptera
- Superfamily: Noctuoidea
- Family: Erebidae
- Genus: Ercheia
- Species: E. dipterygia

Binomial name
- Ercheia dipterygia Hampson, 1913

= Ercheia dipterygia =

Species of moth

Ercheia dipterygia is a species of moth of the family Erebidae. It is found on the Andamans.
