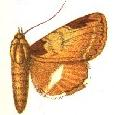

Scientific classification
- Kingdom: Animalia
- Phylum: Arthropoda
- Class: Insecta
- Order: Lepidoptera
- Superfamily: Noctuoidea
- Family: Erebidae
- Genus: Ercheia
- Species: E. quadriplaga

Binomial name
- Ercheia quadriplaga (Walker, 1865)

Synonyms
- Achaea quadriplaga Walker, 1865

= Ercheia quadriplaga =

Species of moth

Ercheia quadriplaga is a species of moth of the family Erebidae. It is found in Asia, including Sulawesi.
