= Ercheia amoena =

Scientific classification
- Kingdom: Animalia
- Phylum: Arthropoda
- Clade: Pancrustacea
- Class: Insecta
- Order: Lepidoptera
- Superfamily: Noctuoidea
- Family: Erebidae
- Genus: Ercheia
- Species: E. amoena

Binomial name
- Ercheia amoena Prout, 1919

Species of moth

Ercheia amoena is a species of moth of the family Erebidae first described by Louis Beethoven Prout in 1919. It is found in New Guinea.

The wingspan is about 50 mm. The forewings are very variegated. The costal edge is narrowly blackish, irregularly dotted with ochreous and the costal area from the base to the postmedian line and a narrow area between the postmedian and subterminal lines are predominantly warm brown. There is a broad central streak from the base nearly to the postmedian and the terminal area is predominantly vinaceous (the colour of red wine). The hindwings are blackish fuscous, but pale and glossy at the costal margin.
