= Ercheia designata =

Scientific classification
- Domain: Eukaryota
- Kingdom: Animalia
- Phylum: Arthropoda
- Class: Insecta
- Order: Lepidoptera
- Superfamily: Noctuoidea
- Family: Erebidae
- Genus: Ercheia
- Species: E. designata

Binomial name
- Ercheia designata (Warren, 1914)

Synonyms
- Melipotis designata Warren, 1914

Species of moth

Ercheia designata is a species of moth of the family Erebidae. It is found in New Guinea.
