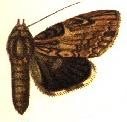

Scientific classification
- Domain: Eukaryota
- Kingdom: Animalia
- Phylum: Arthropoda
- Class: Insecta
- Order: Lepidoptera
- Superfamily: Noctuoidea
- Family: Erebidae
- Genus: Ercheia
- Species: E. styx

Binomial name
- Ercheia styx Bethune-Baker, 1906

= Ercheia styx =

Species of moth

Ercheia styx is a species of moth of the family Erebidae. It is found on New Guinea.
