= Ercheia kebea =

Scientific classification
- Domain: Eukaryota
- Kingdom: Animalia
- Phylum: Arthropoda
- Class: Insecta
- Order: Lepidoptera
- Superfamily: Noctuoidea
- Family: Erebidae
- Genus: Ercheia
- Species: E. kebea

Binomial name
- Ercheia kebea Bethune-Baker, 1906

Synonyms
- Ercheia kebea borneensis Prout, 1919; Melipotis nigristriata Warren, 1914; Ercheia albirenata Gaede, 1917; Ercheia borneensis L.B. Prout, 1919; Ercheia cebea Hampson, 1913

Species of moth

Ercheia kebea is a species of moth in the family Erebidae. It is found in Thailand, Sumatra, Borneo, Seram, New Guinea, Queensland, and east to Fiji.
