= Ercheia bergeri =

Scientific classification
- Kingdom: Animalia
- Phylum: Arthropoda
- Class: Insecta
- Order: Lepidoptera
- Superfamily: Noctuoidea
- Family: Erebidae
- Genus: Ercheia
- Species: E. bergeri

Binomial name
- Ercheia bergeri Viette, 1968

Species of moth

Ercheia bergeri is a species of moth of the family Erebidae. It is found in Madagascar.
