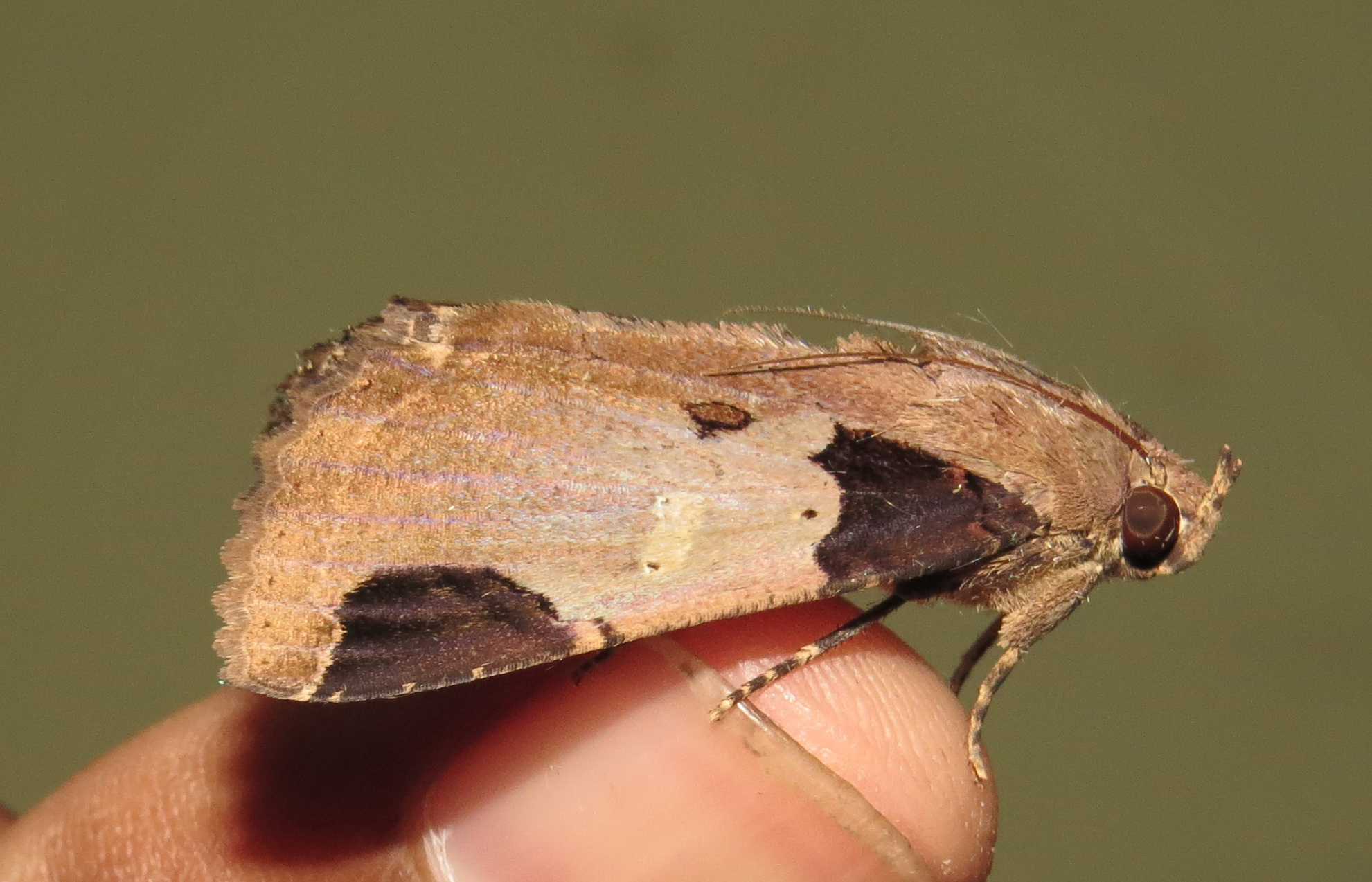
- Male
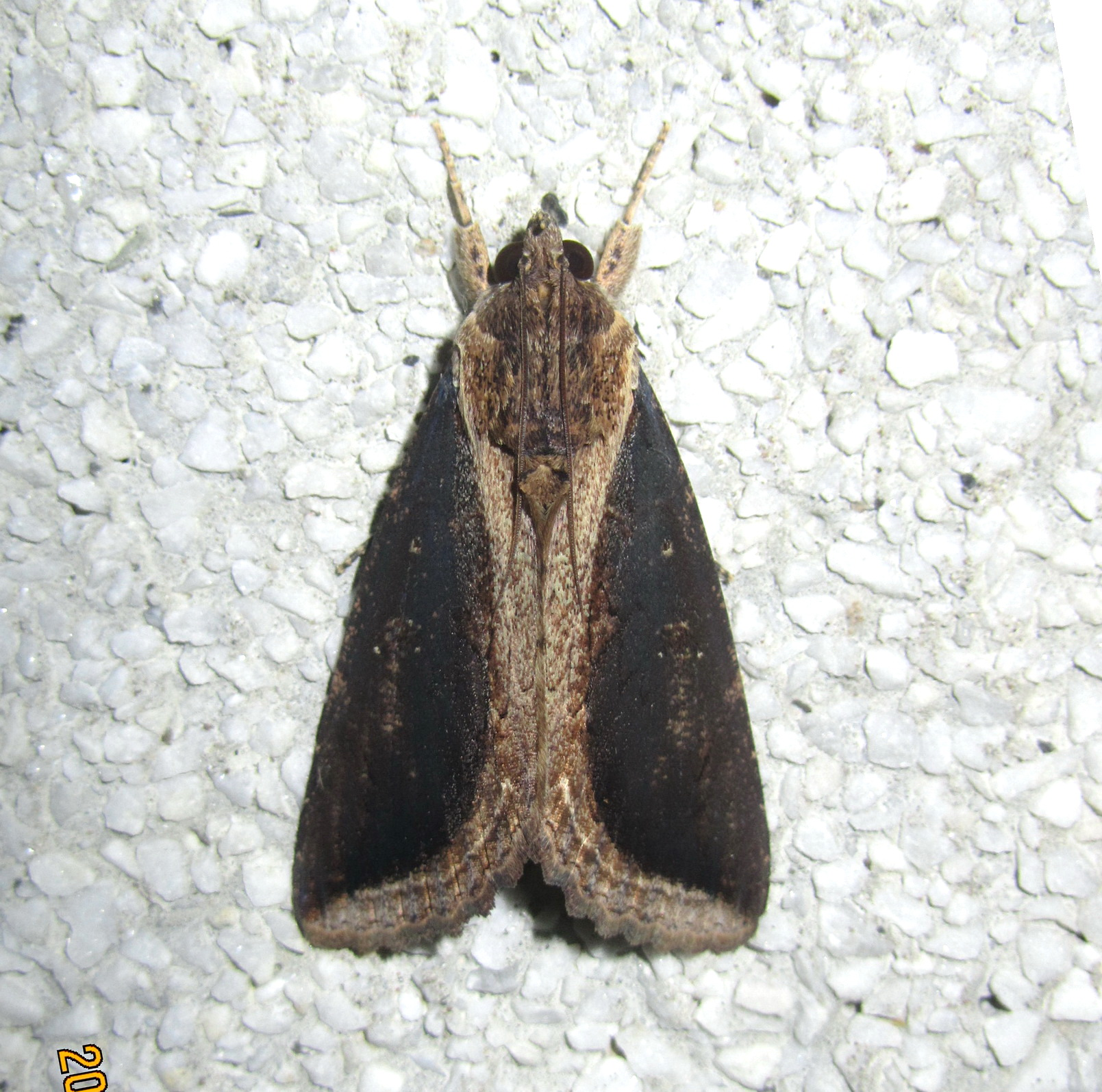
- Female

Scientific classification
- Domain: Eukaryota
- Kingdom: Animalia
- Phylum: Arthropoda
- Class: Insecta
- Order: Lepidoptera
- Superfamily: Noctuoidea
- Family: Erebidae
- Genus: Ercheia
- Species: E. cyllaria

Binomial name
- Ercheia cyllaria (Cramer, 1779)

Synonyms
- Noctua cyllaria Cramer, 1782; Achaea cyllota Guenée, 1852; Achaea fusifera Walker, 1858; Achaea signivitta Walker, 1858; Achaea polychroma Walker, 1858; Achaea atrivitta Walker, 1864; Achaea purpureilinea Walker, 1864; Achaea semipallida Walker, 1864; Ercheia tenebrosa Moore, 1867; Melipotis gundiana Felder, 1874; Melipotis costipannosa Moore, 1882; Ercheia pannosa Moore, 1883; Ercheia uniformis Moore, 1883; Ercheia anvira Swinhoe, 1918; Ercheia cyllota (Guenée, 1852); Ercheia costipannosa (Moore, 1882); Ercheia gundiani (Felder, 1874); Ercheia semipallida (Walker, 1864); Ercheia atrivitta (Walker, 1864); Ercheia polychroma (Walker, 1858); Ercheia signivitta (Walker, 1858); Ercheia fusifera (Walker, 1858); Ercheia charon Butler, 1880; Ercheia collustrans Lucas, 1894

= Ercheia cyllaria =

Species of moth

Ercheia cyllaria is a species of moth of the family Erebidae first described by Pieter Cramer in 1779. It is found in the Indian subregion, Sri Lanka, Taiwan, Japan, Indochina, Thailand, Peninsular Malaysia, Sumatra, Borneo, Seram and the Kai Islands.

== Description ==
Its head, thorax and forewings are pale reddish brown. The collar and patagia are often streaked with black. Forewings with indistinct, waved antemedial line and a very much excurved postmedial line beyond the cell. A waved sub-marginal line is present. Orbicular is a speck and reniform is indistinctly dark outlined. Abdomen and hindwings fuscous black. Hindwings with three medial white spots, which may be disconnected and the costal spot obsolescent or conjoined into a band. A spot near center of outer margin. Cilia white at apex and outer angle. Ventral side ochreous white, irrorated (sprinkled) with black. Forewings with oblique crenulate postmedial line and broad sub-marginal diffused band. Hindwings similar, but with a lunule at end of cell and the line more irregular. Colours and spots can vary in subspecies.

The larvae feed on Asparagus, Brassica, Dalbergia and Grewia species.
