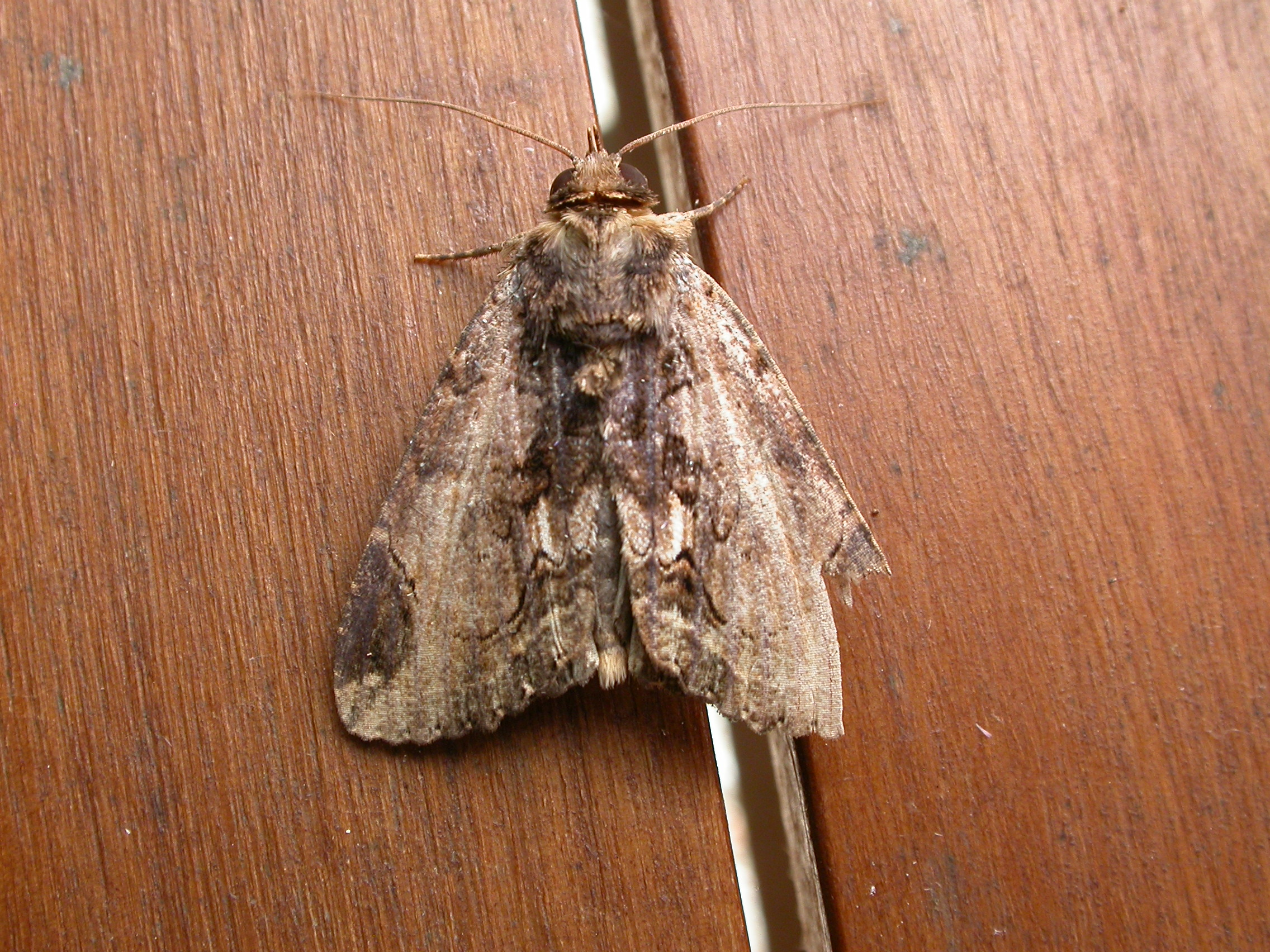

Scientific classification
- Kingdom: Animalia
- Phylum: Arthropoda
- Class: Insecta
- Order: Lepidoptera
- Superfamily: Noctuoidea
- Family: Erebidae
- Genus: Ercheia
- Species: E. dubia

Binomial name
- Ercheia dubia (Butler, 1874)

Synonyms
- Catephia dubia Butler, 1874; Ercheia certa Bethune-Baker, 1906

= Ercheia dubia =

Species of moth

Ercheia dubia is a species of moth of the family Erebidae first described by Arthur Gardiner Butler in 1874. It is found in Asia (including Korea and Japan) and in Australia (Northern Territory and Queensland) and New Guinea

The wingspan is 45–53 mm.

The adult moth of this species is grey or brown, with two large black patches on each forewing: one at the base and one at the wing tip. The hindwings are darker, and each has a large central white spot.
