= Ercheia scotobathra =

Scientific classification
- Kingdom: Animalia
- Phylum: Arthropoda
- Clade: Pancrustacea
- Class: Insecta
- Order: Lepidoptera
- Superfamily: Noctuoidea
- Family: Erebidae
- Genus: Ercheia
- Species: E. scotobathra

Binomial name
- Ercheia scotobathra Prout, 1926

Species of moth

Ercheia scotobathra is a species of moth of the family Erebidae. It is found in Indonesia (Buru).
