= Ercheia chionoptera =

Scientific classification
- Domain: Eukaryota
- Kingdom: Animalia
- Phylum: Arthropoda
- Class: Insecta
- Order: Lepidoptera
- Superfamily: Noctuoidea
- Family: Erebidae
- Genus: Ercheia
- Species: E. chionoptera

Binomial name
- Ercheia chionoptera H. H. Druce, 1912

Species of moth

Ercheia chionoptera is a species of moth of the family Erebidae first described by Hamilton Herbert Druce in 1912. It is found in Cameroon.
