= Ercheia mahagonica =

Scientific classification
- Kingdom: Animalia
- Phylum: Arthropoda
- Clade: Pancrustacea
- Class: Insecta
- Order: Lepidoptera
- Superfamily: Noctuoidea
- Family: Erebidae
- Genus: Ercheia
- Species: E. mahagonica

Binomial name
- Ercheia mahagonica (Saalmüller, 1891)

Synonyms
- Melipotis mahagonica Saalmüller, 1891

Species of moth

Ercheia mahagonica is a species of moth of the family Erebidae first described by Saalmüller in 1891. It is found in Ghana and Madagascar.
