= Ercheia subsignata =

Scientific classification
- Kingdom: Animalia
- Phylum: Arthropoda
- Class: Insecta
- Order: Lepidoptera
- Superfamily: Noctuoidea
- Family: Erebidae
- Genus: Ercheia
- Species: E. subsignata

Binomial name
- Ercheia subsignata (Walker, 1865)

Synonyms
- Achaea subsignata Walker, 1865; Ercheia periploca Holland, 1894

Species of moth

Ercheia subsignata is a species of moth of the family Erebidae. It is found in the Republic of Congo, the Democratic Republic of Congo (North Kivu, East Kasai, Orientale), Ethiopia, Gabon, Ghana, Kenya, Malawi, Nigeria, Sierra Leone and São Tomé & Principe.
