= Air Craft Marine Engineering =

Short-lived aircraft manufacturer

The Air Craft Marine Engineering Company (ACME) was a short-lived aircraft manufacturer based in Van Nuys, California. It was established in 1954 to develop an amphibious utility aircraft, the ACME Anser.
