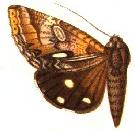

Scientific classification
- Domain: Eukaryota
- Kingdom: Animalia
- Phylum: Arthropoda
- Class: Insecta
- Order: Lepidoptera
- Superfamily: Noctuoidea
- Family: Erebidae
- Genus: Ercheia
- Species: E. ekeikei

Binomial name
- Ercheia ekeikei Bethune-Baker, 1906

Synonyms
- Ercheia eceicei Hampson, 1913

= Ercheia ekeikei =

Species of moth

Ercheia ekeikei is a species of moth of the family Erebidae. It is found in New Guinea as well as Queensland.

The wingspan is about 10 mm.
