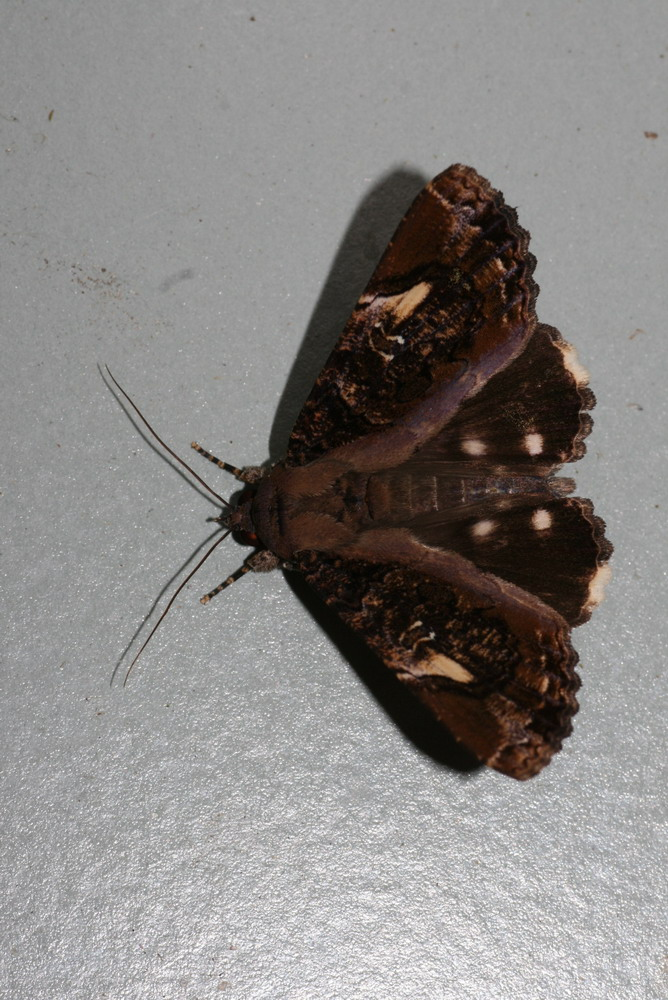
- Female Ercheia pulchrivenula

Scientific classification
- Kingdom: Animalia
- Phylum: Arthropoda
- Class: Insecta
- Order: Lepidoptera
- Superfamily: Noctuoidea
- Family: Erebidae
- Tribe: Ercheiini
- Genus: Ercheia; Walker, 1858

= Ercheia =

Genus of moths

Ercheia is a genus of moths in the family Erebidae. The genus was erected by Francis Walker in 1858.

== Description ==
Palpi upturned, where the second joint reaching vertex of head and third joint long in both sexes. Antennae minutely ciliated in male. Thorax and abdomen smoothly scaled. Mid and hind tibia spined, whereas fore tibia of male clothed with long hair. Forewings with somewhat rounded apex and crenulate cilia in both wings.

== Species ==
- Ercheia amoena L. B. Prout, 1919
- Ercheia bergeri Viette, 1968
- Ercheia careona Swinhoe, 1918
- Ercheia chionoptera Druce, 1912
- Ercheia cyllaria (Cramer, 1779)
- Ercheia designata (Warren, 1914)
- Ercheia dipterygia Hampson, 1913
- Ercheia diversipennis Walker, [1858] (syn: Ercheia ambidens (Felder and Rogenhofer, 1874), Ercheia zygia Swinhoe, 1885)
- Ercheia dubia Butler, 1874
- Ercheia ekeikei Bethune-Baker, 1906
- Ercheia enganica Swinhoe, 1918
- Ercheia kebea Bethune-Baker, 1906
- Ercheia latistria L. B. Prout, 1919
- Ercheia mahagonica (Saalmüller, 1891)
- Ercheia multilinea Swinhoe, 1902
- Ercheia niveostrigata Warren, 1913
- Ercheia pulchrivenula Gaede, 1938
- Ercheia pulchrivena (Walker, 1864)
- Ercheia quadriplaga (Walker, 1865)
- Ercheia scotobathra A. E. Prout, 1926
- Ercheia styx Bethune-Baker, 1906
- Ercheia subsignata (Walker, 1865) (syn: Ercheia periploca Holland, 1894)
- Ercheia umbrosa Butler, 1881
- Ercheia zura Swinhoe, 1885

== Former species ==
- Ercheia albirenata Gaede, 1917
- Ercheia anvira Swinhoe, 1918
- Ercheia spilophracta Turner, 1933 (Facidina)
