= Argonne–Northwestern Solar Energy Research Center =

The Argonne–Northwestern Solar Energy Research Center (ANSER Center) is a joint research program between the Argonne National Laboratory and Northwestern University. Michael R. Wasielewski, Professor of Chemistry at Northwestern founded the ANSER center in 2007 and is its current director. The center's goal is to develop the fundamental understanding, materials, and methods necessary to create efficient and economically viable technologies for solar fuels and electricity production. The union of synthesis, measurement, theory, and engineering allows ANSER to create exceptional new energy conversion systems. As part of its $777 million effort to establish Energy Frontier Research Centers, Grants provided by the US Department of Energy will enable the ANSER "to analyse photosynthesis for ways to create more efficient photovoltaic cells and create hybrid solar cells that have both organic and inorganic components."

== Overview ==
The ANSER Center was established in July 2007 and joins established strengths at Northwestern University (NU) and Argonne National Laboratory (Argonne) with those of senior personnel at Yale University, the University of Illinois at Urbana-Champaign (UIUC), and the University of Chicago (UC) in molecular and nanostructured assemblies, materials, catalysts, and phenomena integral to solar energy conversion and storage.

Vision
The long-term vision of the ANSER Center is to develop the fundamental understanding, materials and methods necessary to create dramatically more efficient technologies for solar fuels and electricity production. The center plans to achieve this vision by designing and synthesizing new nanoscale architectures and studying them to deepen the understanding of basic solar energy conversion phenomena. The union of synthesis, measurement, theory, and engineering will allow ANSER to create exceptional new energy conversion systems. At the same time, the ANSER Center seeks to create and mentor a technically excellent workforce capable of solving energy-related problems far into the future.

Objective
The purpose of multi-disciplinary research carried out by the ANSER Center is to develop a fundamental understanding of the: -Interaction of light and charge with molecules and materials
-Energy levels and electronic structures of molecules and materials
-Dynamics of photo-induced charge generation, separation, and transport with unparalleled temporal and spatial resolution
-Interfaces at which charge generation, separation, transport, and selective chemical reactions occur
-Properties of unique materials, from self-assembling, bio-inspired materials for hydrogen fuel production from water to transparent conductors, and nanostructured hard and soft materials for solar electricity generation

Education and Outreach
The ANSER Center works closely with the NU-based National Center for Learning and Teaching in Nanoscale Science and Engineering (NCLT) to develop outreach programs to the science education community. NCLT participants include Argonne and UIUC, among others as primary partners. ANSER holds joint summer programs with NCLT in the area of undergraduate solar cell and nanotechnology research, professional development, summer research for science teachers, and year-round research with faculty members from partnering minority institutions. Web-based educational materials on solar energy conversion and Web podcasts on topics in the field of solar energy conversion are currently under development. These will be made available broadly to the general public and the K-16 educational establishment.
