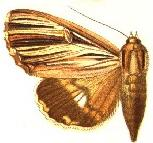
- Echanella multilinea female

Scientific classification
- Domain: Eukaryota
- Kingdom: Animalia
- Phylum: Arthropoda
- Class: Insecta
- Order: Lepidoptera
- Superfamily: Noctuoidea
- Family: Erebidae
- Genus: Ercheia
- Species: E. multilinea

Binomial name
- Ercheia multilinea Swinhoe, 1902

Synonyms
- Ercheia abnormis Swinhoe, 1904

= Ercheia multilinea =

Species of moth

Ercheia multilinea is a species of moth of the family Erebidae. It is found in Sundaland, the Philippines, Sulawesi and Seram. The species is infrequent in forest from the lowlands to 1790m, but is perhaps more often encountered above 1000m.

The species is sexually dimorphic, both sexes being distinctive. Males have most of the forewing a rosy fawn, with the reniform and a subapical patch picked out paler; the dorsum is broadly slaty blue-grey with a white streak at the interior of this zone at two thirds. Females have the forewing longitudinally streaked with dark brown, fawn and cream, with the reniform ringed cream.

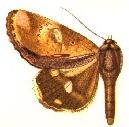
Echanella multilinea male

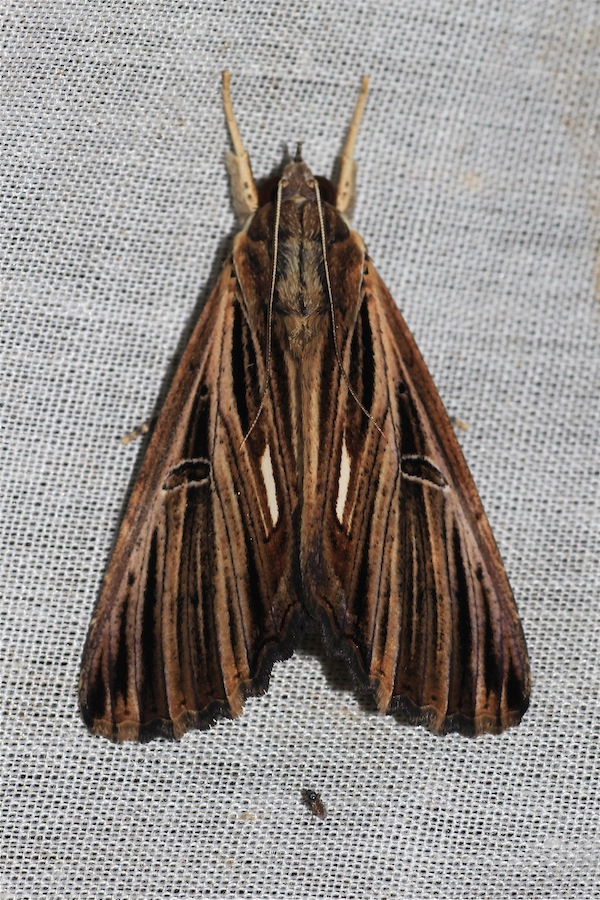
Echanella multilinea female from Borneo
