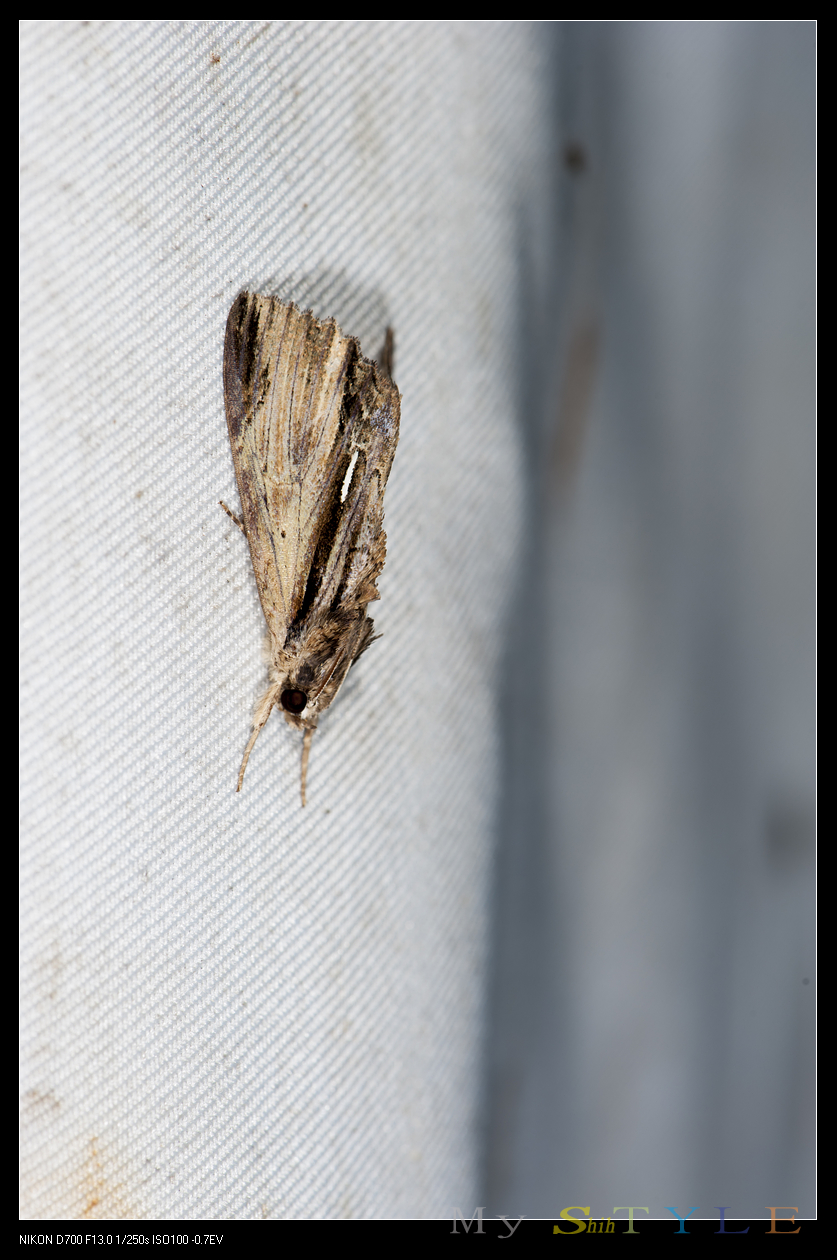

Scientific classification
- Domain: Eukaryota
- Kingdom: Animalia
- Phylum: Arthropoda
- Class: Insecta
- Order: Lepidoptera
- Superfamily: Noctuoidea
- Family: Erebidae
- Genus: Ercheia
- Species: E. niveostrigata

Binomial name
- Ercheia niveostrigata Warren, 1913

= Ercheia niveostrigata =

Species of moth

Ercheia niveostrigata is a species of moth of the family Erebidae first described by Warren in 1913. It is found in Taiwan.
