= Ercheia latistria =

Scientific classification
- Kingdom: Animalia
- Phylum: Arthropoda
- Clade: Pancrustacea
- Class: Insecta
- Order: Lepidoptera
- Superfamily: Noctuoidea
- Family: Erebidae
- Genus: Ercheia
- Species: E. latistria

Binomial name
- Ercheia latistria Prout, 1919

Species of moth

Ercheia latistria is a species of moth of the family Erebidae. It is found in Indonesia, where it has been recorded from Halmahera (Maluku Islands).
