= Ercheia enganica =

Scientific classification
- Domain: Eukaryota
- Kingdom: Animalia
- Phylum: Arthropoda
- Class: Insecta
- Order: Lepidoptera
- Superfamily: Noctuoidea
- Family: Erebidae
- Genus: Ercheia
- Species: E. enganica

Binomial name
- Ercheia enganica C. Swinhoe, 1918

Species of moth

Ercheia enganica is a species of moth of the family Erebidae first described by Charles Swinhoe in 1918. It is found in Indonesia, where it has been recorded from Enggano Island near Sumatra.
