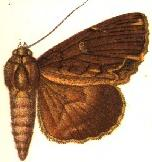

Scientific classification
- Kingdom: Animalia
- Phylum: Arthropoda
- Class: Insecta
- Order: Lepidoptera
- Superfamily: Noctuoidea
- Family: Erebidae
- Genus: Ercheia
- Species: E. umbrosa

Binomial name
- Ercheia umbrosa Butler, 1881

Synonyms
- Ercheia strigipennis (Moore, 1882); Melipotis strigipennis Moore, 1882

= Ercheia umbrosa =

Species of moth

Ercheia umbrosa is a species of moth of the family Erebidae. It is found in Japan, Korea, China and India.

The larvae feed on Albizzia julibrissin.
