= Ercheia diversipennis =

Scientific classification
- Kingdom: Animalia
- Phylum: Arthropoda
- Class: Insecta
- Order: Lepidoptera
- Superfamily: Noctuoidea
- Family: Erebidae
- Genus: Ercheia
- Species: E. diversipennis

Binomial name
- Ercheia diversipennis Walker, 1858

Synonyms
- Melipotis ambidens Felder & Rogenhofer, 1874; Ercheia zura Swinhoe, 1885; Ercheia zygia Swinhoe, 1885

Species of moth

Ercheia diversipennis is a species of moth of the family Erebidae first described by Francis Walker in 1858. It is found in Sri Lanka, India, Myanmar, Indonesia and Malaysia.
