= Ansari =

Ansari, or variants, may refer to:

== People ==
- Ansari (surname), including a list of people with the name
- Ansar (Islam), citizens of Medina who helped the prophet Muhammad after he migrated from Mecca
- Ansari (nesba), an Arab community, found predominantly in the Arab and South Asian countries
  - Ansari (Panipat)
- Momin Ansari, a Muslim community of merchants found mainly in India, Pakistan, and Nepal
- Alawites, often called "Ansaris" in older sources

== Places ==
- Ansariyah, Lebanon
- Ansariyeh, Razavi Khorasan, Iran
- Ansari mountains, the Syrian Coastal Mountain Range

== Other uses ==
- Ansari X Prize, a former space competition

== See also ==
- Ansar (disambiguation)
