= Hybrid solar cell =

Type of photovoltaic cell

Hybrid solar cells combine advantages of both organic and inorganic semiconductors. Hybrid photovoltaics have organic materials that consist of conjugated polymers that absorb light as the donor and transport holes. Inorganic materials are used as the acceptor and electron transport. These devices have a potential for low-cost by roll-to-roll processing and scalable solar power conversion.

== Theory ==
Photovoltaics convert sunlight into electricity by the photovoltaic effect. Electrons absorb photon energy that excites them to the conduction band from the valence band. This generates a hole-electron pair separated by a potential barrier (such as a p-n junction), and induces a current.

=== Hybrid solar cell ===
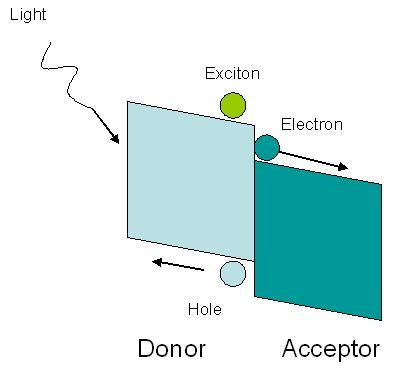
Figure 1. Energy diagram of the donor and acceptor. The conduction band of the acceptor is lower than the LUMO of the polymer, allowing for transfer of the electron.

Hybrid solar cells mix an organic material with a high electron transport material to form the photoactive layer. The two materials are assembled in a heterojunction-type photoactive layer, which can have greater power conversion efficiency than a single material. One of the materials acts as the photon absorber and exciton donor. The other facilitates exciton dissociation at the junction. Charge is transferred and then separated after an exciton created in the donor is delocalized on a donor-acceptor complex.

The acceptor material needs a suitable energy offset to the binding energy of the exciton to the absorber. Charge transfer is favorable if the following condition is satisfied:

$$E_A^A - E_A^D > U_D$$

where A and D refer to the acceptor and donor, respectively, E_{A} is the electron affinity, and U the exciton's coulombic binding energy on the donor. An energy diagram of the interface is shown in figure 1. Commonly used photovoltaic polymers such as MEH-PPV feature exciton binding energy from 0.3-1.4 eV.

The energy required to separate the exciton is provided by the energy offset between the LUMOs or conduction bands of the donor and acceptor. After dissociation, the carriers are transported to the respective electrodes through a percolation network.

The average distance an exciton can diffuse through a material before annihilation by recombination is the exciton diffusion length. FOr polymers, this is on the order of 5–10 nanometers. The time scale for radiative and non-radiative decay is from 1 picosecond to 1 nanosecond. Excitons generated within this length close to an acceptor would contribute to the photocurrent.

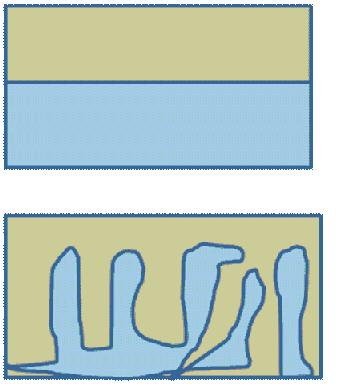
Figure 2. Two different structures of heterojunctions, a) phase separated bi-layer and b) bulk heterojunction. The bulk heterojunction allows for more interfacial contact between the two phases, which is beneficial for the nanoparticle-polymer compound as it provides more surface area for charge transfer.

To deal with this short exciton diffusion length, a bulk heterojunction structure is used rather than a phase-separated bilayer. Dispersing the particles throughout the polymer matrix creates a larger interfacial area for charge transfer to occur. Figure 2 displays the difference between a bilayer and a bulk heterojunction.

=== Types of interfaces and structures ===
Controlling the interface of inorganic-organic hybrid solar cells can increase the efficiency of the cells. This increased efficiency can be achieved by increasing the interfacial surface area between the organic and the inorganic materials to facilitate charge separation and by controlling the nanoscale lengths and periodicity of each structure so that charges separate and move toward the appropriate electrode without recombining. The three main nanoscale structures used are:

- mesoporous inorganic films infused with electron-donating organic,
- alternating inorganic-organic lamellar structures,
- and nanowire structures.

==== Mesoporous films ====
Mesoporous films have been used for hybrid solar cells. The structure of mesoporous thin film solar cells typically includes a porous inorganic that is saturated with organic surfactant. The organic absorbs light, and transfers electrons to the inorganic semiconductor (usually a transparent conducting oxide), which then transfers the electron to the electrode. Problems with these cells include their random ordering and the difficulty of controlling their nanoscale structure to promote charge conduction.

==== Ordered lamellar films ====
Alternating layers of organic and inorganic compounds have been controlled through electrodeposition-based self-assembly. This is of interest because lamellar structure and periodicity of the alternating organic-inorganic layers can be controlled through solution chemistry. To produce this type of cell with practical efficiencies, larger organic surfactants that absorb more of the visible spectrum must be deposited between the layers of electron-accepting inorganic.

==== Films of ordered nanostructures ====
Researchers grew nanostructure-based solar cells that use ordered nanostructures like nanowires or nanotubes of inorganic surrounding by electron-donating organics utilizing self-organization processes. Ordered nanostructures offer the advantage of directed charge transport and controlled phase separation between donor and acceptor materials. The nanowire-based morphology offers reduced internal reflection, facile strain relaxation and increased defect tolerance. The ability to make single-crystalline nanowires on low-cost substrates such as aluminum foil and to relax strain in subsequent layers removes two more major cost hurdles associated with high-efficiency cells. There have been rapid increases in efficiencies of nanowire-based solar cells and they seem to be one of the most promising nanoscale solar hybrid technologies.

=== Fundamental challenge factors ===
Hybrid cell efficiency must be increased to start large-scale manufacturing. Three factors affect efficiency. First, the bandgap should be reduced to absorb red photons, which contain a significant fraction of the energy in the solar spectrum. Current organic photovoltaics have shown 70% of quantum efficiency for blue photons. Second, contact resistance between each layer in the device should be minimized to offer higher fill factor and power conversion efficiency. Third, charge-carrier mobility should be increased to allow the photovoltaics to have thicker active layers while minimizing carrier recombination and keeping the series resistance of the device low.

== Types of hybrid solar cells ==
=== Polymer–nanoparticle composite ===
Nanoparticles are a class of semiconductor materials whose size in at least one dimension ranges from 1 to 100 nanometers, on the order of exciton wavelengths. This size control creates quantum confinement and allows for the tuning of optoelectronic properties, such as band gap and electron affinity. Nanoparticles also have a large surface area to volume ratio, which presents more area for charge transfer to occur.

The photoactive layer can be created by mixing nanoparticles into a polymer matrix. Solar devices based on polymer-nanoparticle composites most resemble polymer solar cells. In this case, the nanoparticles take the place of the fullerene based acceptors used in fully organic polymer solar cells. Hybrid solar cells based upon nanoparticles are an area of research interest because nanoparticles have several properties that could make them preferable to fullerenes, such as:

- Fullerenes are synthesized by a combination of a high temperature arc method and continuous gas-phase synthesis, which makes their production difficult and energy intensive. The colloidal synthesis of nanoparticles by contrast is a low temperature process.
- PCBM (a common fullerene acceptor) diffuses during long timespans or when exposed to heat, which can alter the morphology and lower the efficiency of a polymer solar cell. Limited testing of nanoparticle solar cells indicates they may be more stable over time.
- Nanoparticles are more absorbent than fullerenes, meaning more light can be theoretically absorbed in a thinner device.
- Nanoparticle size can affect absorption. This combined with the fact that there are many possible semiconducting nanoparticles allows for highly customizable bandgaps that can be easily tuned to certain frequencies, which would be advantageous in tandem solar cells.
- Nanoparticles with size near their Bohr radius can generate two excitons when struck by a sufficiently energetic photon.

==== Structure and processing ====
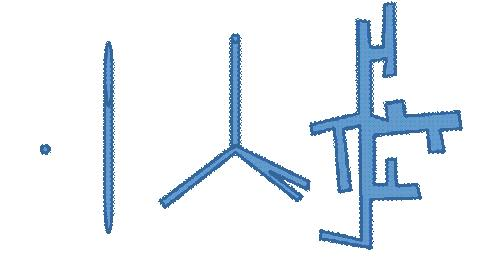
Figure 3. Four different structures of nanoparticles, which have at least 1 dimension in the 1–100 nm range, retaining quantum confinement. Left is a nanocrystal, next to it is nanorod, third is tetrapod, and right is hyperbranched.

For polymers used in this device, hole mobilities are greater than electron mobilities, so the polymer phase is used to transport holes. The nanoparticles transport electrons to the electrode.

The interfacial area between the polymer phase and the nanoparticles needs to be large. This is achieved by dispersing the particles throughout the polymer matrix. However, the nanoparticles need to be interconnected to form percolation networks for electron transport, which occurs by hopping events.

Efficiency is affected by aspect ratio, geometry, and volume fraction of the nanoparticles. Nanoparticle structures include nanocrystals, nanorods, and hyperbranched structures. Figure 3 contains a picture of each structure. Different structures change the conversion efficiency by effecting nanoparticle dispersion in the polymer and providing pathways for electron transport.

The nanoparticle phase is required to provide a pathway for the electrons to reach the electrode. By using nanorods instead of nanocrystals, the hopping event from one crystal to another can be avoided.

Fabrication methods include mixing the two materials in a solution and spin-coating it onto a substrate, and solvent evaporation (sol-gel). Most of these methods do not involve high-temperature processing. Annealing increases order in the polymer phase, increasing conductivity. However, annealing for too long causes the polymer domain size to increase, eventually making it larger than the exciton diffusion length, and possibly allowing some of the metal from the contact to diffuse into the photoactive layer, reducing the efficiency of the device.

==== Materials ====
Inorganic semiconductor nanoparticles used in hybrid cells include CdSe (size ranges from 6–20 nm), ZnO, TiO, and PbS. Common polymers used as photo materials have extensive conjugation and are also hydrophobic. Their efficiency as a photo-material is affected by the HOMO level position and the ionization potential, which directly affects the open circuit voltage and the stability in air. The most common polymers used are P3HT (poly (3-hexylthiophene)), and M3H-PPV (poly[2-methoxy, 5-(2′-ethyl-hexyloxy)-p-phenylenevinylene)]). P3HT has a bandgap of 2.1 eV and M3H-PPV has a bandgap of ~2.4 eV. These values correspond with the bandgap of CdSe, 2.10 eV. The electron affinity of CdSe ranges from 4.4 to 4.7 eV. When the polymer used is MEH-PPV, which has an electron affinity of 3.0 eV, the difference between the electron affinities is large enough to drive electron transfer from the CdSe to the polymer. CdSe also has a high electron mobility (600 cm^{2}·V^{−1}·s^{−1}).

==== Performance values ====
The highest demonstrated efficiency is 3.2%, based upon a PCPDTBT polymer donor and CdSe nanoparticle acceptor. The device exhibited a short circuit current of 10.1 mA·cm^{−2}, an open circuit voltage of .68 V, and a fill factor of .51.

==== Challenges ====
Hybrid solar cells need increased efficiencies and stability over time before commercialization is feasible. In comparison to the 2.4% of the CdSe-PPV system, silicon photodevices have power conversion efficiencies greater than 20%.

Problems include controlling the amount of nanoparticle aggregation as the photolayer forms. The particles need to be dispersed in order to maximize interface area, but need to aggregate to form networks for electron transport. The network formation is sensitive to the fabrication conditions. Dead end pathways can impede flow. A possible solution is implementing ordered heterojunctions, where the structure is well controlled.

The structures can undergo morphological changes over time, namely phase separation. Eventually, the polymer domain size will be greater than the carrier diffusion length, which lowers performance.

Even though the nanoparticle bandgap can be tuned, it needs to be matched with the corresponding polymer. The 2.0 eV bandgap of CdSe is larger than an ideal bandgap of 1.4 for absorbance of light.

The nanoparticles involved are typically colloids, which are stabilized in solution by ligands. The ligands decrease device efficiency because they serve as insulators which impede interaction between the donor and nanoparticle acceptor as well as decreasing the electron mobility. Some, but not complete success has been had by exchanging the initial ligands for pyridine or another short chain ligand.

Hybrid solar cells exhibit material properties inferior to those of bulk silicon semiconductors. The carrier mobilities are much smaller than that of silicon. Electron mobility in silicon is 1000 cm^{2}·V^{−1}·s^{−1}, compared to 600 cm^{2}·V^{−1}·s^{−1} in CdSe, and less than 10 cm^{2}·V^{−1}·s^{−1} in other quantum dot materials. Hole mobility in MEH-PPV is 0.1 cm^{2}·V^{−1}·s^{−1}, while in silicon it is 450 cm^{2}·V^{−1}·s^{−1}.

=== Carbon nanotubes ===
Carbon nanotubes (CNTs) have high electron conductivity, high thermal conductivity, robustness, and flexibility. Field emission displays (FED), strain sensors, and field effect transistors (FET) using CNTs have been demonstrated. Each application shows the potential of CNTs for nanoscale devices and for flexible electronics applications. Photovoltaic applications have also been explored for this material.

Mainly, CNTs have been used as either the photo-induced exciton carrier transport medium impurity within a polymer-based photovoltaic layer or as the photoactive (photon-electron conversion) layer. Metallic CNT is preferred for the former application, while semiconducting CNT is preferred for the later.

==== Efficient carrier transport medium ====
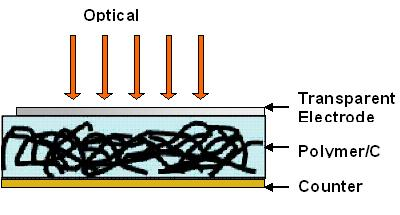
Device diagram for CNT as efficient carrier transport medium.

To increase the photovoltaic efficiency, electron-accepting impurities must be added to the photoactive region. By incorporating CNTs into the polymer, dissociation of the exciton pair can be accomplished by the CNT matrix. The high surface area (~1600 m^{2}/g) of CNTs offers a good opportunity for exciton dissociation. The separated carriers within the polymer-CNT matrix are transported by the percolation pathways of adjacent CNTs, providing the means for high carrier mobility and efficient charge transfer. The factors of performance of CNT-polymer hybrid photovoltaics are low compared to those of inorganic photovoltaics. SWNT in P3OT semiconductor polymer demonstrated open circuit voltage (V_{oc}) of below 0.94 V, with short circuit current (I_{sc}) of 0.12 mA/cm^{2}.

Metal nanoparticles may be applied to the exterior of CNTs to increase the exciton separation efficiency. The metal provides a higher electric field at the CNT-polymer interface, accelerating the exciton carriers to transfer them more effectively to the CNT matrix. In this case, V_{oc} = 0.3396 V and I_{sc} = 5.88 mA/cm^{2}. The fill factor is 0.3876%, and the white light conversion factor 0.775%.

==== Photoactive matrix layer ====
CNT may be used as a photovoltaic device not only as an add-in material to increase carrier transport, but also as the photoactive layer itself. The semiconducting single walled CNT (SWCNT) is a potentially attractive material for photovoltaic applications for the unique structural and electrical properties. SWCNT has high electric conductivity (100 times that of copper) and shows ballistic carrier transport, greatly decreasing carrier recombination. The bandgap of the SWCNT is inversely proportional to the tube diameter, which means that SWCNT may show multiple direct bandgaps matching the solar spectrum.

A strong built-in electric field in SWCNT for efficient photogenerated electron-hole pair separation has been demonstrated by using two asymmetrical metal electrodes with high and low work functions. The open circuit voltage (V_{oc}) is 0.28 V, with short circuit current (I_{sc}) 1.12 nA·cm^{−2} with an incident light source of 8.8 W·cm^{−2}. The resulting white light conversion factor is 0.8%.

==== Challenges ====
Several challenges must be addressed for CNT to be used in photovoltaic applications. CNT degrades over time in an oxygen-rich environment. The passivation layer required to prevent CNT oxidation may reduce the optical transparency of the electrode region and lower the photovoltaic efficiency.

===== Challenges as efficient carrier transport medium =====
Additional challenges involve the dispersion of CNT within the polymer photoactive layer. The CNT is required to be well dispersed within the polymer matrix to form charge-transfer-efficient pathways between the excitons and the electrode

===== Challenges as photoactive matrix layer =====
Challenges of CNT for the photoactive layer include its lack of capability to form a p-n junction, due to the difficulty of doping certain segments of a CNT. (A p-n junction creates an internal built-in potential, providing a pathway for efficient carrier separation within the photovoltaic.) To overcome this difficulty, energy band bending has been done by the use of two electrodes of different work functions. A strong built-in electric field covering the whole SWCNT channel is formed for high-efficiency carrier separation. The oxidation issue with CNT is more critical for this application. Oxidized CNTs have a tendency to become more metallic, and so less useful as a photovoltaic material.

=== Dye-sensitized ===
Dye-sensitized solar cells consists of a photo-sensitized anode, an electrolyte, and a photo-electrochemical system. Hybrid solar cells based on dye-sensitized solar cells are formed with inorganic materials (TiO_{2}) and organic materials.

==== Materials ====
Hybrid solar cells based on dye-sensitized solar cells are fabricated by dye-absorbed inorganic materials and organic materials. TiO_{2} is the preferred inorganic material since this material is easy to synthesize and acts as a n-type semiconductor due to the donor-like oxygen vacancies. However, titania only absorbs a small fraction of the UV spectrum. Molecular sensitizers (dye molecules) attached to the semiconductor surface are used to collect a greater portion of the spectrum. In the case of titania dye-sensitized solar cells, a photon absorbed by a dye-sensitizer molecule layer induces electron injection into the conduction band of titania, resulting in current flow. However, short diffusion length (diffusivity, D_{n}≤10^{−4}cm^{2}/s) in titania dye-sensitized solar cells decrease the solar-to-energy conversion efficiency. To enhance diffusion length (or carrier lifetime), a variety of organic materials are attached to the titania.

==== Fabrication scheme ====
===== Dye-sensitized photoelectrochemical cell (Grätzel cell) =====
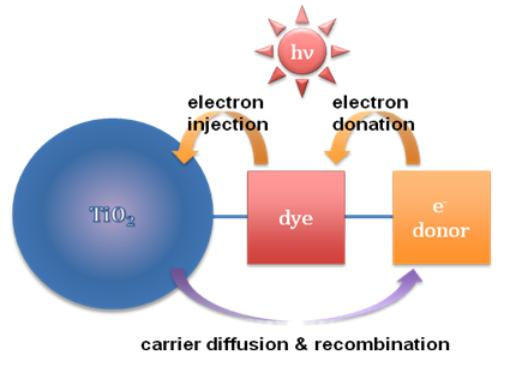
Fig. 5. Schematic representation of electron-hole generation and recombination

TiO_{2} nanoparticles are synthesized in several tens of nanometer scales (~100 nm). In order to make a photovoltaic cell, molecular sensitizers (dye molecules) are attached to the titania surface. The dye-absorbed titania is finally enclosed by a liquid electrolyte. This type of dye-sensitized solar cell is also known as a Grätzel cell. Dye-sensitized solar cell has a disadvantage of a short diffusion length. Recently, supermolecular or multifunctional sensitizers have been investigated so as to enhance carrier diffusion length. For example, a dye chromophore has been modified by the addition of secondary electron donors. Minority carriers (holes in this case) diffuse to the attached electron donors to recombine. Therefore, electron-hole recombination is retarded by the physical separation between the dye–cation moiety and the TiO_{2} surface, as shown in Fig. 5. Finally, this process raises the carrier diffusion length, resulting in the increase of carrier lifetime.

===== Solid-state dye sensitized solar cell =====
Mesoporous materials contain pores with diameters between 2 and 50 nm. A dye-sensitized mesoporous film of TiO_{2} can be used for making photovoltaic cells and this solar cell is called a ‘solid-state dye sensitized solar cell’. The pores in mesoporous TiO_{2} thin film are filled with a solid hole-conducting material such as p-type semiconductors or organic hole conducting material. Replacing the liquid electrolyte in Grätzel's cells with a solid charge-transport material can be beneficial. The process of electron-hole generation and recombination is the same as Grätzel cells. Electrons are injected from photoexcited dye into the conduction band of titania and holes are transported by a solid charge transport electrolyte to an electrode. Many organic materials have been tested to obtain a high solar-to-energy conversion efficiency in dye synthesized solar cells based on mesoporous titania thin film.

==== Efficiency factors ====
Efficiency factors demonstrated for dye-sensitized solar cells are

| Parameters | Types of dye sensitized solar cells | |
| Parameters | Grätzel cell | Solid-state |
|---|---|---|
| Efficiency (%) | ~ 10–11 | ~ 4 |
| V_{oc} (V) | ~ 0.7 | ~ 0.40 |
| J_{sc} (mA/cm^{2}) | ~ 20 | ~ 9.10 |
| Fill factor | ~ 0.67 | ~ 0.6 |

==== Challenges ====
Liquid organic electrolytes contain highly corrosive iodine, leading to problems of leakage, sealing, handling, dye desorption, and maintenance. Much attention is now focused on the electrolyte to address these problems.

For solid-state dye sensitized solar cells, the first challenge originates from disordered titania mesoporous structures. Mesoporous titania structures should be fabricated with well-ordered titania structures of uniform size (~ 10 nm). The second challenge comes from developing the solid electrolyte, which is required to have these properties:

1. The electrolyte should be transparent to the visible spectrum (wide band gap).
2. Fabrication should be possible for depositing the solid electrolyte without degrading the dye molecule layer on titania.
3. The LUMO of the dye molecule should be higher than the conduction band of titania.
4. Several p-type semiconductors tend to crystallize inside the mesoporous titania films, destroying the dye molecule-titania contact. Therefore, the solid electrolyte needs to be stable during operation.

=== Nanostructured inorganic — small molecules ===
In 2008, scientists were able to create a nanostructured lamellar structure that provides an ideal design for bulk heterojunction solar cells. The observed structure is composed of ZnO and small, conducting organic molecules, which co-assemble into alternating layers of organic and inorganic components. This highly organized structure, which is stabilized by π-π stacking between the organic molecules, allows for conducting pathways in both the organic and inorganic layers. The thicknesses of the layers (about 1–3 nm) are well within the exciton diffusion length, which ideally minimizes recombination among charge carriers. This structure also maximizes the interface between the inorganic ZnO and the organic molecules, which enables a high chromophore loading density within the structure. Due to the choice of materials, this system is non-toxic and environmentally friendly, unlike many other systems which use lead or cadmium.

Although this system has not yet been incorporated into a photovoltaic device, preliminary photoconductivity measurements have shown that this system exhibits among the highest values measured for organic, hybrid, and amorphous silicon photoconductors, and so, offers promise in creating efficient hybrid photovoltaic devices.
