= ACME Anser =

Anser

General information
- Type: twin-jet utility aircraft
- National origin: United States
- Manufacturer: ACME (Air Craft Marine Engineering Company)
- Designer: Robert M. Berns

The ACME Anser was an amphibious twin-jet utility aircraft that was developed in the United States by Air Craft Marine Engineering in 1958. The project was cancelled before the prototype was complete.

== Design and development ==
The ACME Company (Air Craft Marine Engineering Company), was formed in September 1954 by Robert M. Berns, a former Lockheed Missile Systems design engineer, to design and develop the prototype of an eight-seat amphibian executive aircraft. The ACME Anser, (Anser from 'Analytical Services', a contributor to the design), was to have been a 6-passenger jet-powered amphibian incorporating advance features; an advanced hull design from NACA test tank data, boundary layer control system and a retractable outboard motor, for taxiing on water.

The structure of the Anser was to have been largely formed of honeycomb skins using fibre-glass and light alloy skin. The cantilever shoulder-mounted wing was to have been a two-spar structure with honey-comb upper panels, fibre-glass leading edges and light-alloy lower skins with boundary-layer suction and re-circulation over flaps and ailerons. The hull was to have been formed with Magnesium alloy castings for high-stress areas and fibre-glass honeycomb skin panels. The tail unit was to have been a simplified light-alloy built-up structure with a plastic foam core mounting a V-tail and housing the retractable outboard motor. A retractable tri-cycle undercarriage was proposed with the main gear retracting into stabilising sponsons either side of the fuselage. The design of the Anser was to CARA 04b requirements allowing its use as a commercial aircraft.

The crew and passenger sat in a pressurised cabin lined with urethane foam for sound-proofing, shock absorption and thermal insulation.

The two Turbomeca based Continental Model 420 turbofan engines were mounted at the wing-root trailing edge adjacent to the fuselage, in easily removable engine change units, with fuel housed in wing leading edge, wing-tip tanks and a hull flexible bag tank.

A mock-up was completed before construction of a prototype and production were cancelled.

== Specifications (Anser - estimated) ==
Data from Jane's All the World's Aircraft 1958-59, Aviation Week 9 September 1957

General characteristics

- Crew: 2
- Capacity: 6 pax / 1,830 lb (830 kg)
- Length: 38 ft (12 m)
- Wingspan: 46 ft (14 m)
- Height: 11 ft 6 in (3.51 m)
- Cabin width: 5 ft 8 in (1.73 m)
- Cabin length: 10 ft 0 in (3.05 m)
- Cabin headroom: 4 ft 11 in (1.50 m)
- Cabin volume: 280 cu ft (7.9 m^{3})
- Baggage hold volume: 80 cu ft (2.3 m^{3})
- Wing area: 264.5 sq ft (24.57 m^{2})
- Aspect ratio: 7.83
- Airfoil: NACA 7 series
- Gross weight: 8,900 lb (4,037 kg)
- Fuel capacity: total capacity 482 US gal (401 imp gal; 1,820 L) / 3,216 lb (1,459 kg) ; 2x 65 US gal (54 imp gal; 246 L) wing leading edge tanks, 2x 86 US gal (72 imp gal; 330 L) wing-tip tanks and a 180 US gal (150 imp gal; 681 L) hull mounted bag tank
- Powerplant: 2 × Continental 420 turbofan engines, 790 lbf (3.5 kN) thrust each

Performance

- Maximum speed: 370 mph (600 km/h, 320 kn)
- Cruise speed: 340 mph (550 km/h, 300 kn)
- Landing speed: 45 mph (39 kn; 72 km/h)
- Range: 1,160 mi (1,870 km, 1,010 nmi)
- Rate of climb: 1,200 ft/min (6.1 m/s)
