= Anabad, Iran =

City in Razavi Khorasan province, Iran

Anabad Persian: انابد
- City
- Location within Iran
- Coordinates: 35°15′06″N 57°48′36″E
- Country: Iran
- Province: Razavi Khorasan
- County: Bardaskan
- District: Anabad
- Established as a city: 2000

Population (2016)
  - Total: 6,186
- Time zone: UTC+3:30 (IRST)

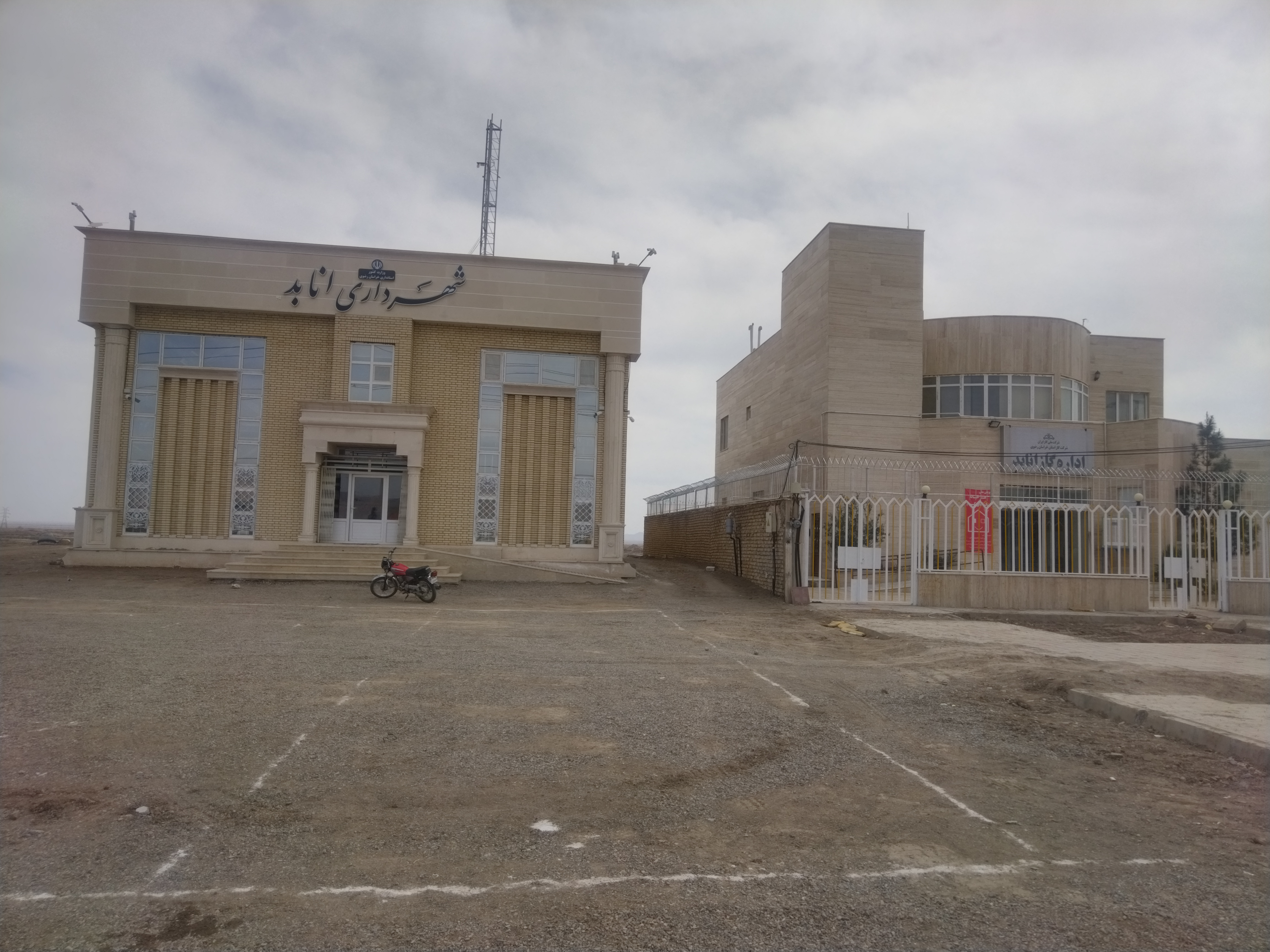
Anabad in 2024

Anabad (Persian: انابد) (Note: Also romanized as Anābad; also known as Anābat, Anār Āb, and Anārbat) is a city in, and the capital of, Anabad District in Bardaskan County, Razavi Khorasan province, Iran. It also serves as the administrative center for Sahra Rural District. The village of Anabad was converted to a city in 2000.

== Demographics ==
=== Population ===
At the time of the 2006 National Census, the city's population was 5,968 in 1,480 households. The following census in 2011 counted 5,739 people in 1,588 households. The 2016 census measured the population of the city as 6,186 people in 1,861 households.
