= Zura, Afghanistan =

Zura
- Location in Afghanistan
- Coordinates: 35°36′24″N 67°4′55″E
- Country: Afghanistan
- Province: Balkh Province
- Time zone: + 4.30

Zura is a village in Balkh Province in northern Afghanistan.

== See also ==
- Balkh Province
