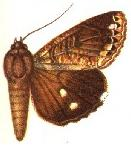

Scientific classification
- Kingdom: Animalia
- Phylum: Arthropoda
- Class: Insecta
- Order: Lepidoptera
- Superfamily: Noctuoidea
- Family: Erebidae
- Genus: Ercheia
- Species: E. pulchrivena

Binomial name
- Ercheia pulchrivena (Walker, 1864)

Synonyms
- Achaea pulchrivena Walker, 1864; Ercheia hollowayi Kobes, 1985

= Ercheia pulchrivena =

Species of moth

Ercheia pulchrivena is a species of moth of the family Erebidae first described by Francis Walker in 1864. It is found on Sumatra and Borneo.
