= Anabad, Azerbaijan =

Anabad
- Municipality
- Location within Azerbaijan
- Coordinates: 38°55′55″N 46°02′15″E
- Country: Azerbaijan
- Autonomous republic: Nakhchivan
- District: Ordubad

Population (2005)
  - Total: 213
- Time zone: UTC+4 (AZT)

Anabad (also, Anabat) is a municipality and village in the Ordubad District of Nakhchivan, Azerbaijan. The village is located in the right side of the Ordubad-Ganza highway, 4 km away from the district center, on the left bank of the Ganza River. Its population is busy with gardening and animal husbandry. There are secondary school, club and a medical center in the village. It has a population of 213.

== Etymology ==
Related with this word there exist microtoponyms as Anabad yeri (Qubadlı), Anabad dərəsi (Laçın), etc. In the south from the Van Lake, there is a village the named "Anabad" near the "Anabad temple". According to some researchers, the name is related with the Persian word of anapat (a place where nobody lives). The name made out from the components of the Turkic words of ana (major, main, senior, large, big) and bad/bat/bet (mountain slope, descent, slopes) means "great mountain slope". Till 1918, there was settlement, named "Anabad" in the Kapan district of Armenia.
