= Ansar, Hamadan =

Ansar انصار
- Village
- Location within Iran
- Coordinates: 35°24′37″N 48°11′46″E
- Country: Iran
- Province: Hamadan
- County: Kabudarahang
- Bakhsh: Gol Tappeh
- Rural District: Mehraban-e Sofla

Population (2006)
  - Total: 139
- Time zone: UTC+3:30 (IRST)
  - Summer (DST): UTC+4:30 (IRDT)

Ansar (Persian: انصار, also Romanized as Anşār; also known as Kachal Aḩmad) is a village in Mehraban-e Sofla Rural District, Gol Tappeh District, Kabudarahang County, Hamadan Province, Iran. At the 2006 census, its population was 139, in 31 families.
