= Sahra Rural District =

Rural district in Razavi Khorasan province, Iran

Sahra Rural District Persian: دهستان صحرا
- Rural District
- Location within Iran
- Coordinates: 35°17′N 57°43′E
- Country: Iran
- Province: Razavi Khorasan
- County: Bardaskan
- District: Anabad
- Established: 1987
- Capital: Anabad

Population (2016)
  - Total: 8,593
- Time zone: UTC+3:30 (IRST)

Sahra Rural District (Persian: دهستان صحرا) is in Anabad District of Bardaskan County, Razavi Khorasan province, Iran. It is administered from the city of Anabad.

== Demographics ==
=== Population ===
At the time of the 2006 National Census, the rural district's population was 7,916 in 2,043 households. There were 8,127 inhabitants in 2,412 households at the following census of 2011. The 2016 census measured the population of the rural district as 8,593 in 2,679 households. The most populous of its 68 villages was Mozaffarabad, with 1,524 people.

=== Other villages in the rural district ===
- Bab ol Hakam
- Ebrahimabad
- Eslamabad
- Hatiteh
- Marandiz
- Zamanabad
