= Doruneh Rural District =

Rural district in Razavi Khorasan province, Iran

Doruneh Rural District Persian: دهستان درونه
- Rural District
- Location within Iran
- Coordinates: 35°07′N 56°58′E
- Country: Iran
- Province: Razavi Khorasan
- County: Bardaskan
- District: Anabad
- Established: 1995
- Capital: Doruneh

Population (2016)
  - Total: 3,782
- Time zone: UTC+3:30 (IRST)

Doruneh Rural District (Persian: دهستان درونه) is in Anabad District of Bardaskan County, Razavi Khorasan province, Iran. Its capital is the village of Doruneh.

== Demographics ==
=== Population ===
At the time of the 2006 National Census, the rural district's population was 3,684 in 875 households. There were 3,789 inhabitants in 1,063 households at the following census of 2011. The 2016 census measured the population of the rural district as 3,782 in 1,127 households. The most populous of its 97 villages was Doruneh, with 1,603 people.

=== Other villages in the rural district ===
- Chah Mejeng
- Cheshmeh-ye Hajji Soleyman
- Esmailabad
- Hoseynabad-e Mahlar-e Sofla
- Kalateh-ye Baraq-e Olya
- Rasan
- Salehiyeh
