= Bardaskan County =

County in Razavi Khorasan province, Iran

Bardaskan County Persian: شهرستان بردسکن
- County
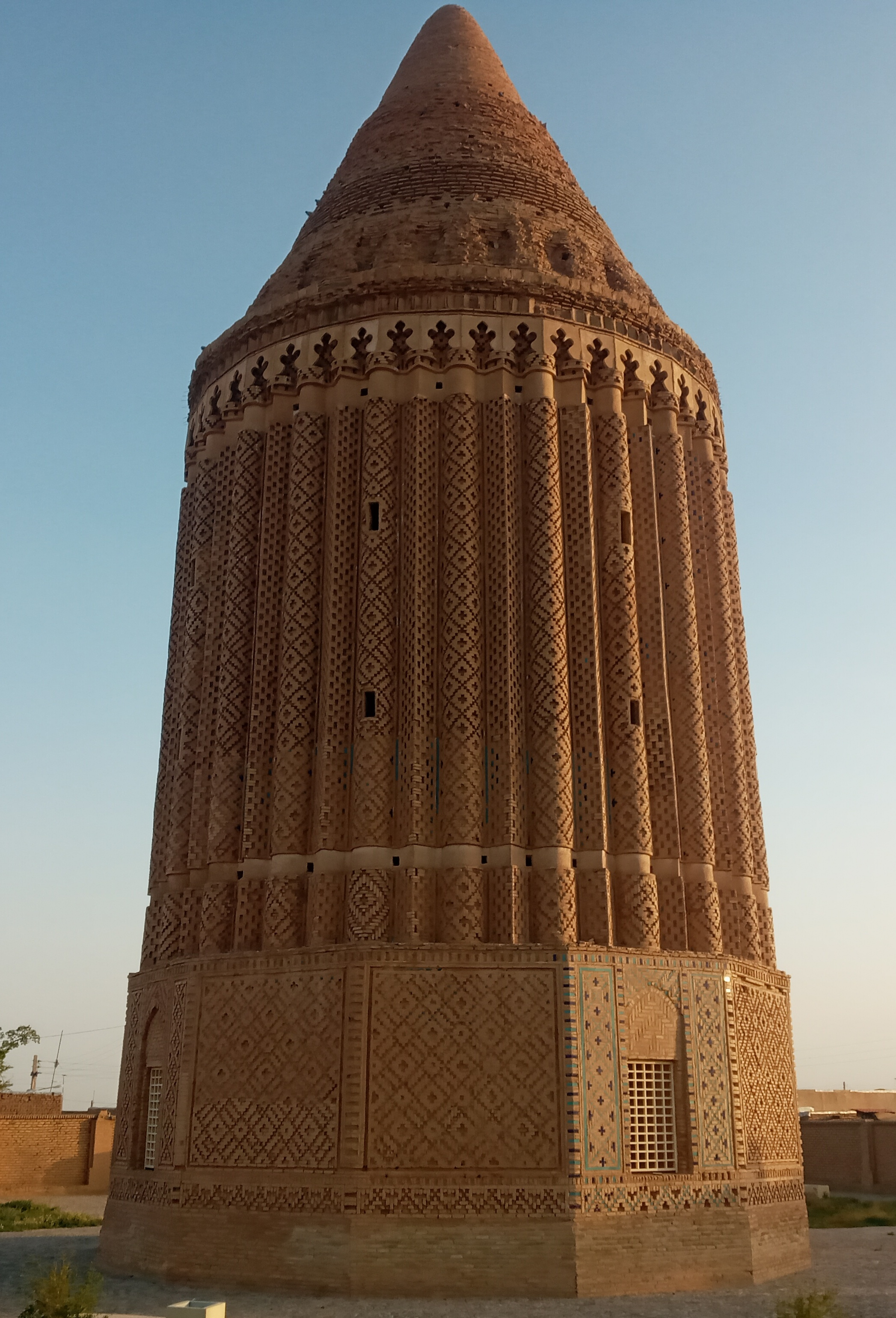
- Aliabad Tower

- Location of Bardaskan County in Razavi Khorasan province (bottom left, green)

- Location of Razavi Khorasan province in Iran
- Coordinates: 35°10′N 57°13′E
- Country: Iran
- Province: Razavi Khorasan
- Established: 1995
- Capital: Bardaskan
- Districts: Central, Anabad, Shahrabad

Population (2016)
  - Total: 75,631
- Time zone: UTC+3:30 (IRST)

Bardaskan County (Persian: شهرستان بردسکن) (Note: Also known as Baradaskan (باردسکن) and Berdaskan (برداسکن)) is in Razavi Khorasan province, Iran. Its capital is the city of Bardaskan.

== History ==
In 2009, the village of Shahrabad was elevated to the status of a city.

== Demographics ==
=== Population ===
At the time of the 2006 National Census, the county's population was 68,392 in 18,229 households. The following census in 2011 counted 72,626 people in 21,171 households. The 2016 census measured the population of the county as 75,631 in 23,732 households.

=== Administrative divisions ===
Bardaskan County's population history and administrative structure over three consecutive censuses are shown in the following table.

Bardaskan County Population
Administrative Divisions	2006	2011	2016
Central District	33,105	36,503	38,605
Kenarshahr RD	5,065	5,513	5,504
Kuhpayeh RD	5,829	4,883	4,868
Bardaskan (city)	22,211	26,107	28,233
Anabad District	17,568	17,655	18,561
Doruneh RD	3,684	3,789	3,782
Sahra RD	7,916	8,127	8,593
Anabad (city)	5,968	5,739	6,186
Shahrabad District	17,719	18,412	18,465
Jolgeh RD	6,919	7,385	7,382
Shahrabad RD	10,800	8,772	9,000
Shahrabad (city)		2,255	2,083
Total	68,392	72,626	75,631
RD = Rural District

== Geography and climate ==
Bardaskan is at the northern edge of the Namak Desert (Great Salt Desert). Its area is 8,535 square kilometres (3,295 mi^{2}). The altitude of Bardaskan is 985 metres (3,232 ft). The weather in northern Bardaskan is cold while the weather in southern and central Bardaskan varies from semi-dry to hot and dry. Annual average rainfall is 150 millimetres (5.9 in). The summer high temperature is nearly 45 °C (113 °F), and winter low is −5 °C (23 °F). There are no perennial rivers, but there are several seasonal rivers.

== Economy ==
The main jobs are farming and animal husbandry. Staple crops are wheat, barley, cotton and cumin seed, and pistachio, saffron, pomegranate, fig and grape products. Saffron, pistachios, and figs are the main commercial products from the county.

== Education ==
Azad University is the only institute of higher education since 2000.

== See also ==
Media related to Bardaskan County at Wikimedia Commons
