= Anabad District =

District in Razavi Khorasan province, Iran

Anabad District Persian: بخش انابد
- District
- Location within Iran
- Coordinates: 35°07′N 57°06′E
- Country: Iran
- Province: Razavi Khorasan
- County: Bardaskan
- Established: 1995
- Capital: Anabad

Population (2016)
  - Total: 18,561
- Time zone: UTC+3:30 (IRST)

Anabad District (Persian: بخش انابد) is in Bardaskan County, Razavi Khorasan province, Iran. Its capital is the city of Anabad.

== Demographics ==
=== Population ===
At the time of the 2006 National Census, the district's population was 17,568 in 4,398 households. The following census in 2011 counted 17,655 people in 5,063 households. The 2016 census measured the population of the district as 18,561 inhabitants in 5,667 households.

=== Administrative divisions ===
Anabad District Population
Administrative Divisions	2006	2011	2016
Doruneh RD	3,684	3,789	3,782
Sahra RD	7,916	8,127	8,593
Anabad (city)	5,968	5,739	6,186
Total	17,568	17,655	18,561
RD = Rural District
