= Nishapur =

City in Razavi Khorasan Province, Iran

Nishapur نیشابور (Persian) Abarshahr (اَبَرشهر) Raēvant (رَئِوَنْت) Shadiyakh (شادیاخ)
- City
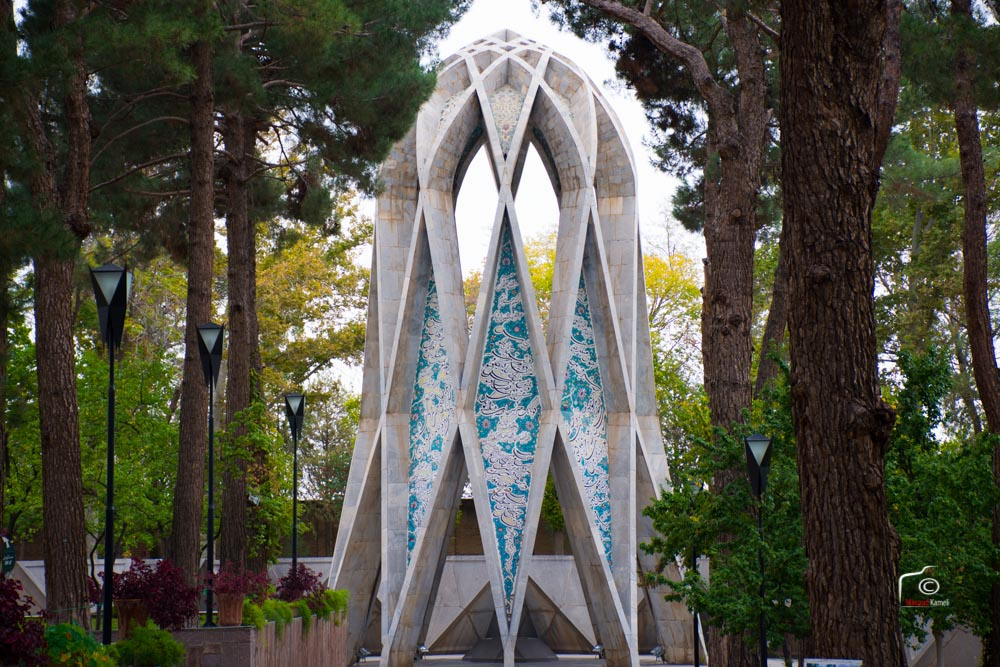
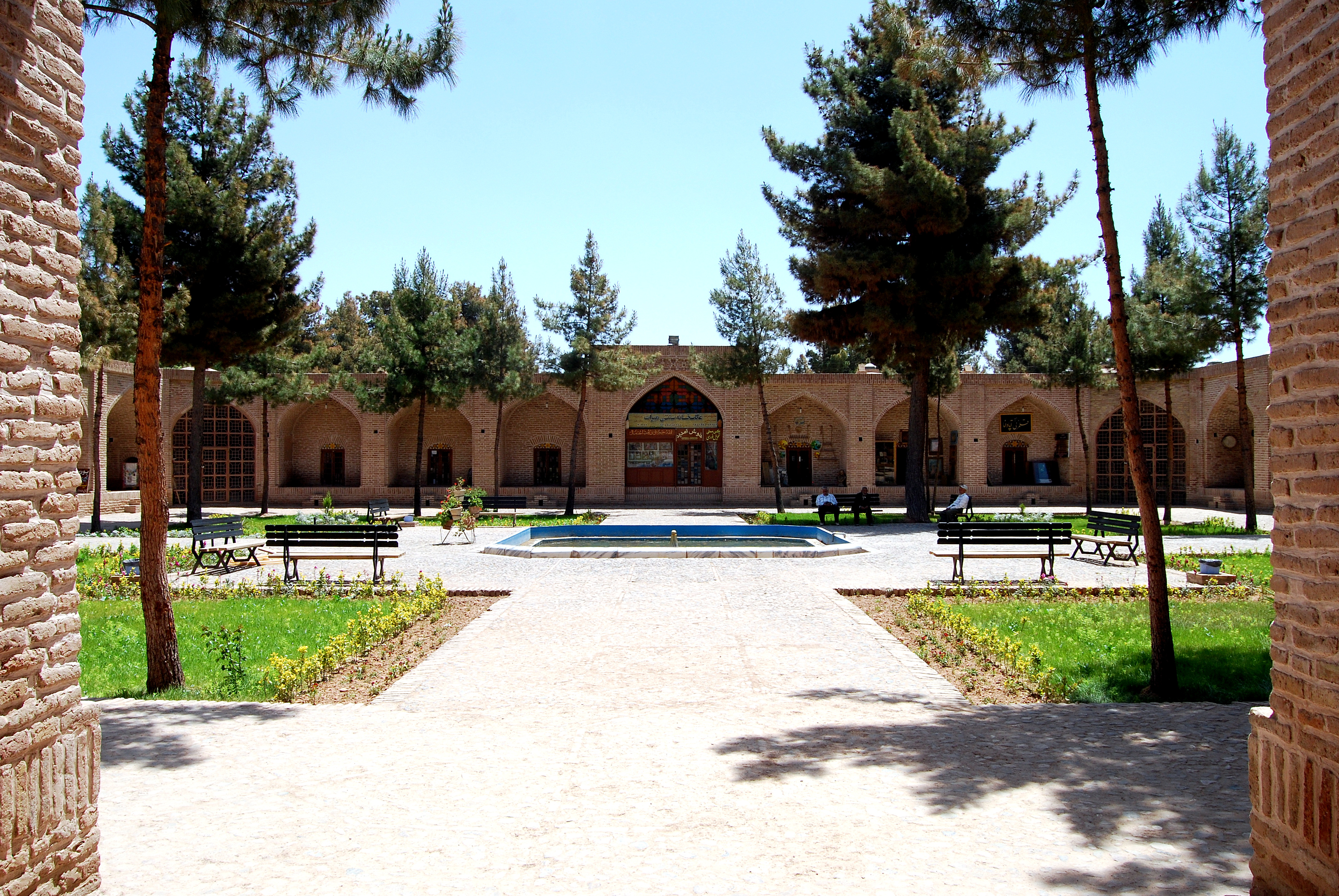
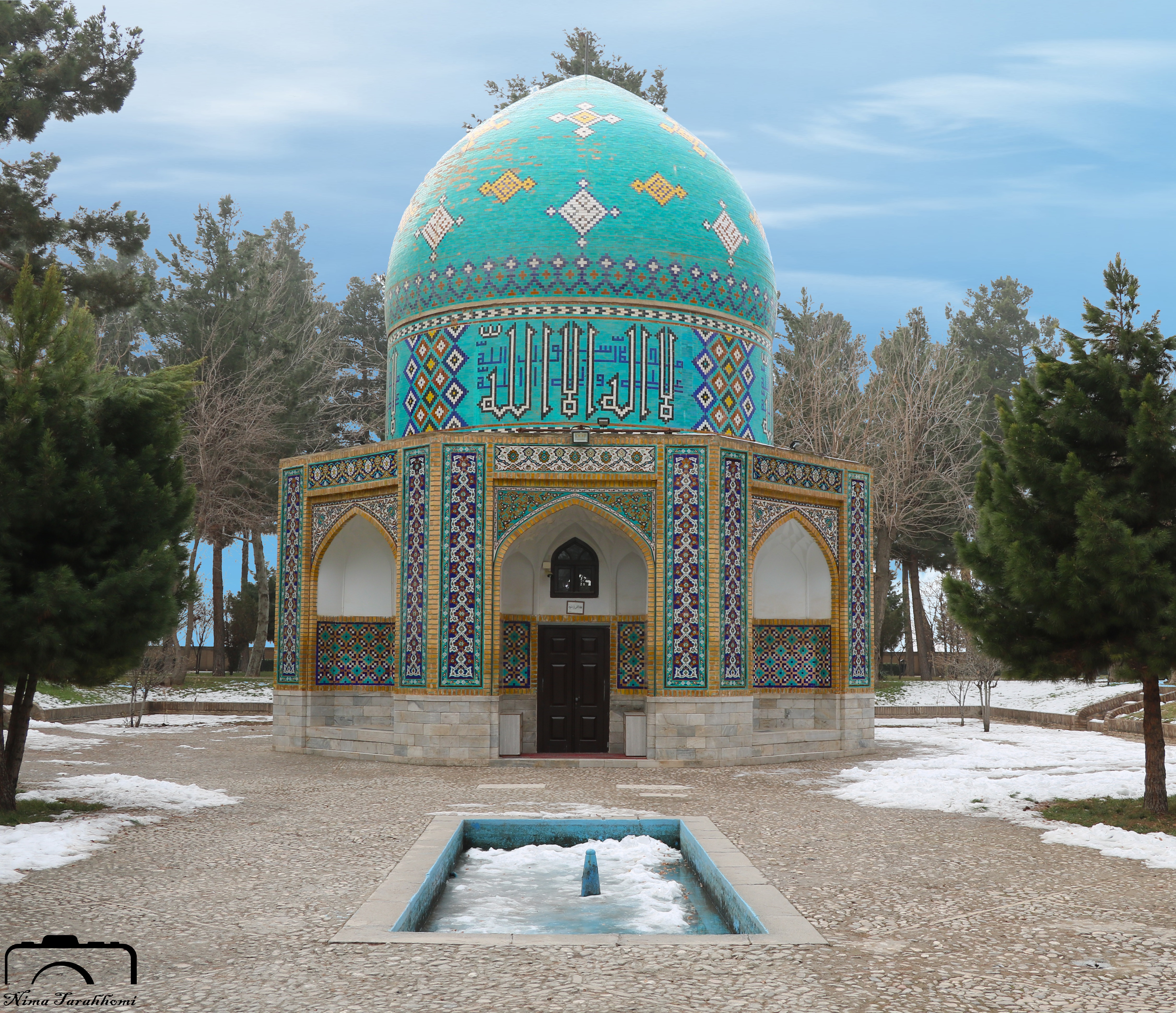
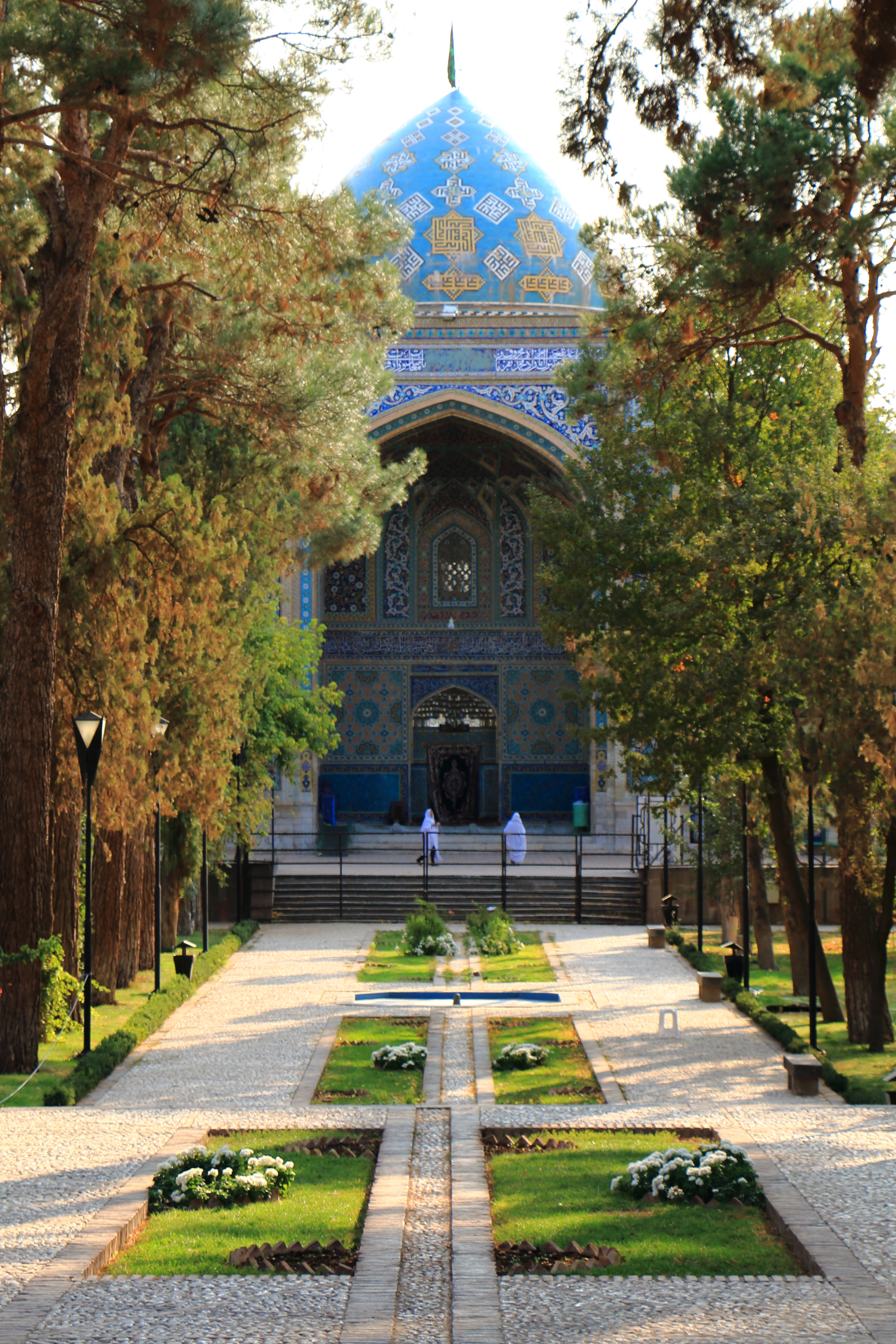
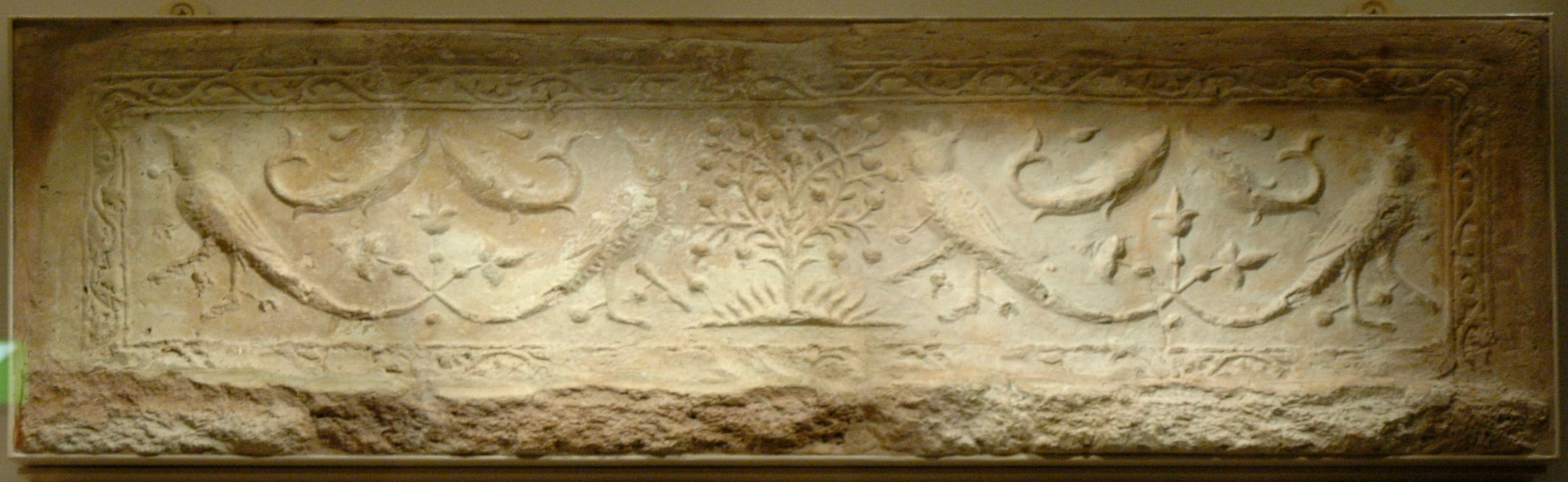
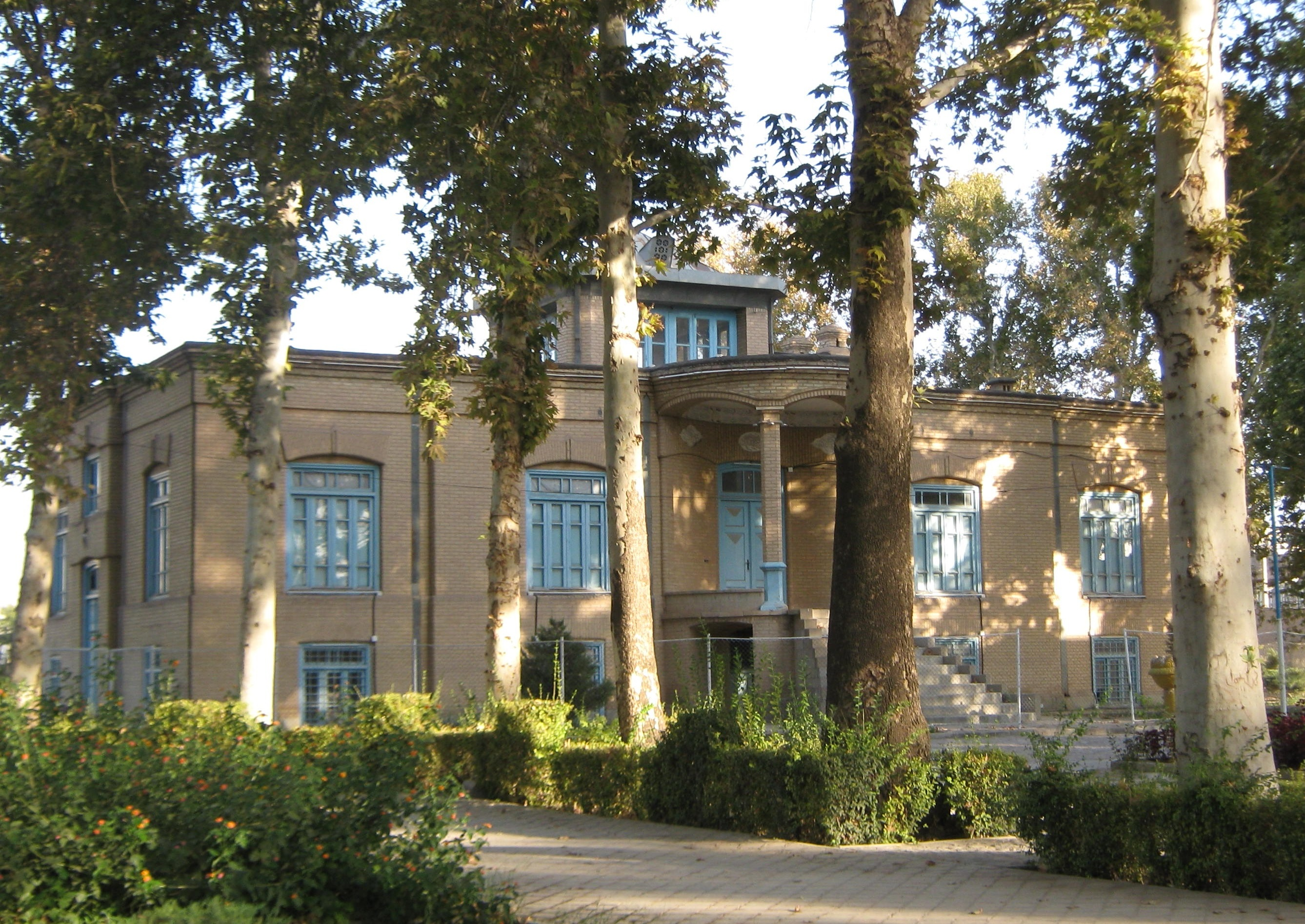
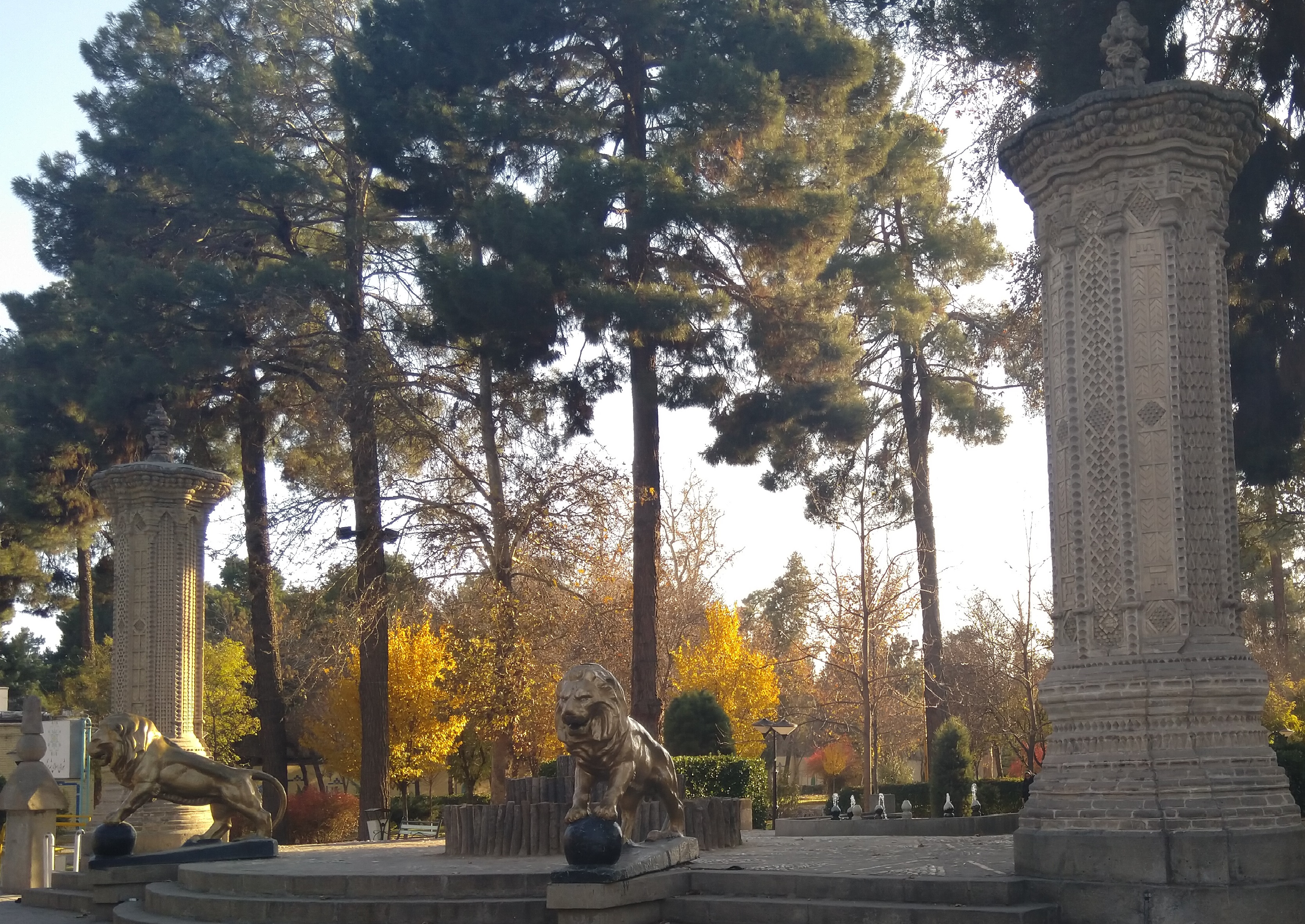
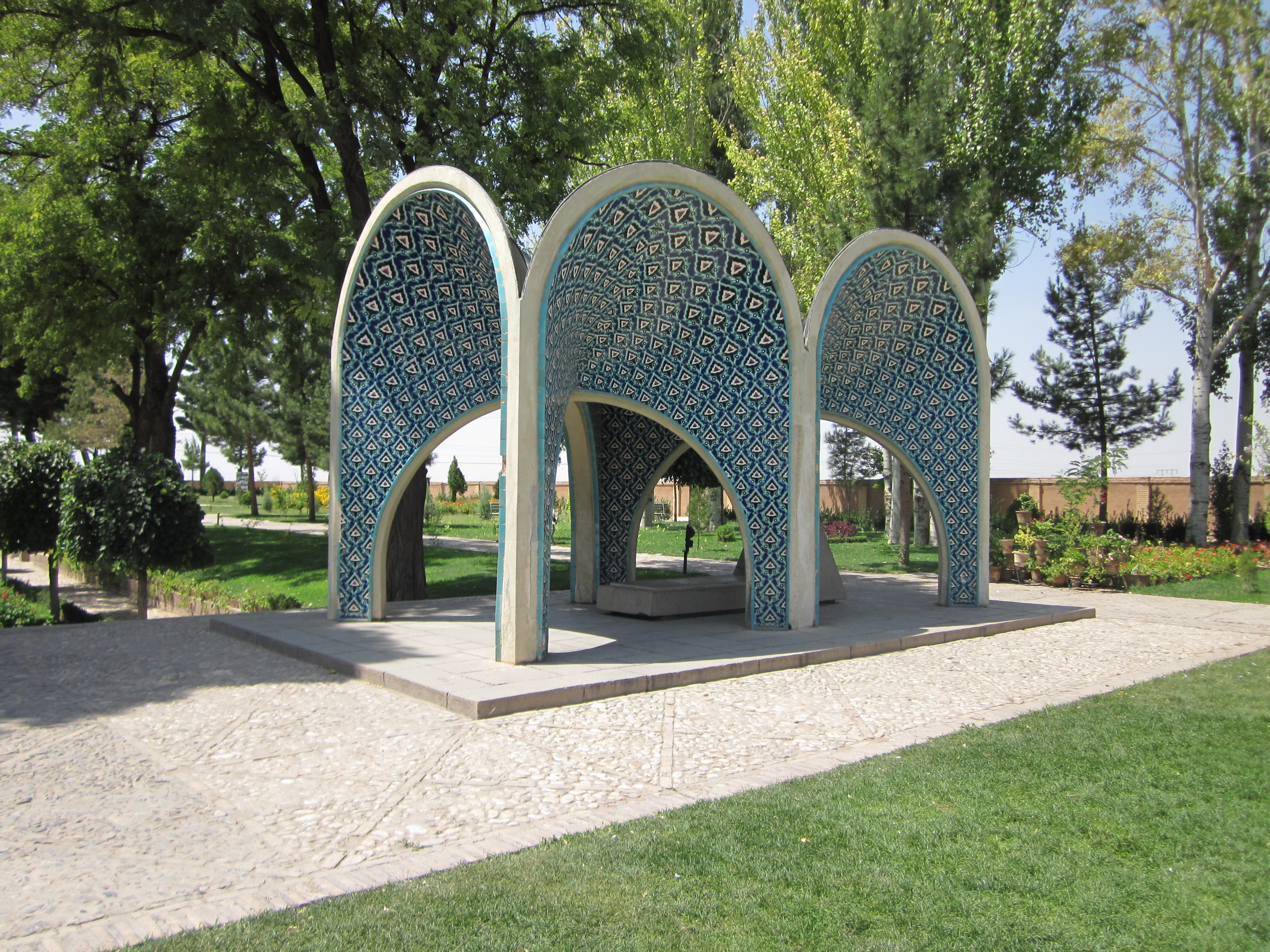
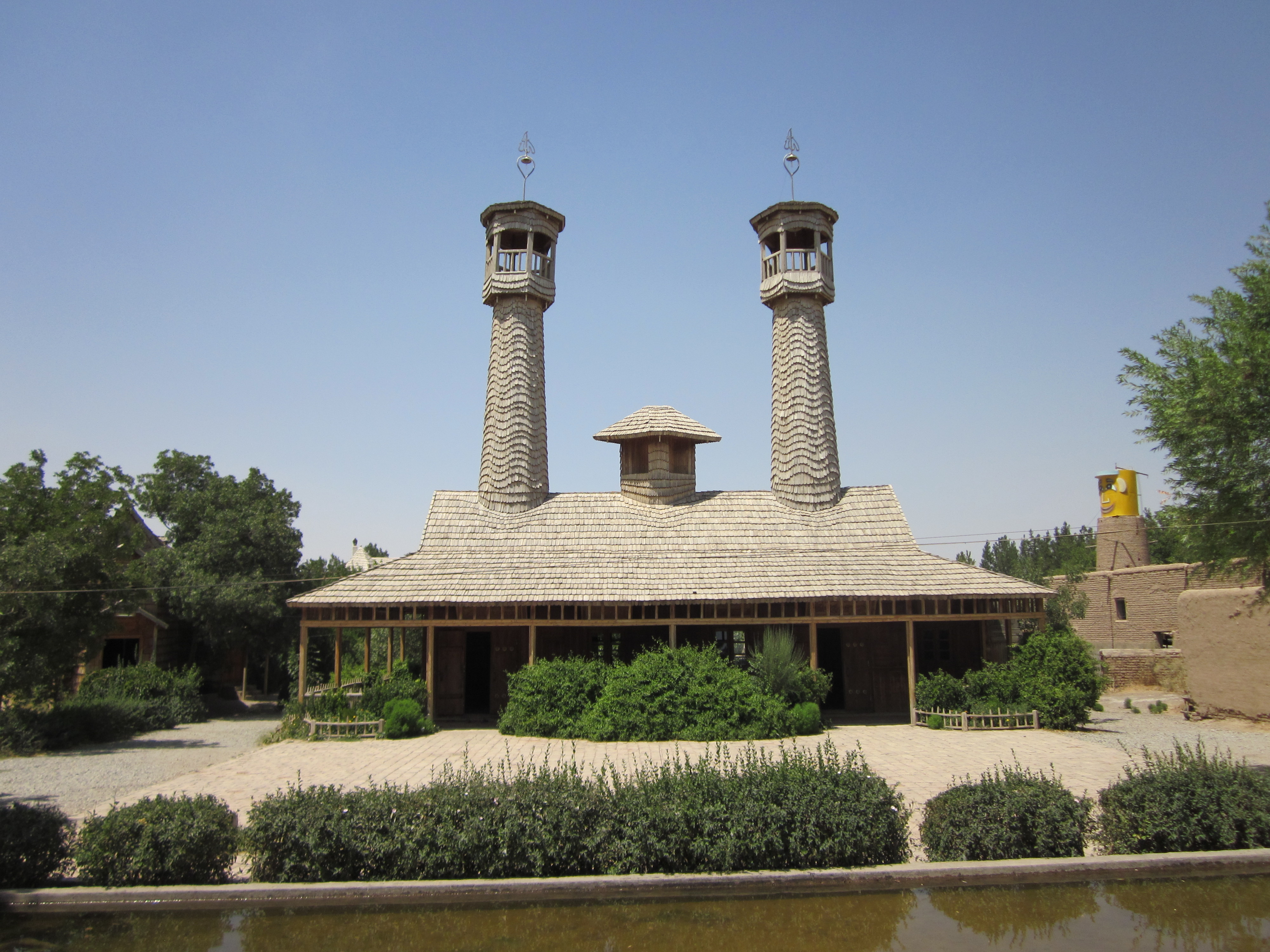
- From top to bottom & from left to right: Mausoleum of Omar Khayyám, Shah Abbasi Caravansarai, Mausoleum of Attar of Nishapur, Imamzadeh Mohammad Mahrouq & Khayyam's garden, An archeological discovery of Nishapur, Bagh-e Meli of Nishapur, Khanate Mansion of Amin Islami, Kamal Al-Molk Tomb and the Wooden Mosque of Nishapur.

- Seal
- Nicknames: Sasanian and Umayyed era: Abarshahr (Upper Cities), Little Damascus (According to Ibn Battuta), The City of Turquoise, The City of Gardens
- Location within Iran Location within West and Central Asia
- Coordinates: 36°12′22″N 58°47′36″E
- Country: Iran
- Province: Razavi Khorasan
- County: Nishapur
- District: Central
- Historical Region: Khorasan
- Founded: 3rd century AD
- Municipality of Nishapur: 1931
- Founder: Shapur I

Government
  - Type: Governorate, Mayor & City Council
  - Mayor: Hassan MereTatiKa
  - Governor of County: Mahdi Davandeh
- Elevation: 1,250 m (4,100 ft)

Population (2016)
  - City: 264,375
- Demonym(s): Nishapuri, Nishaburi or Neyshaburi
- Time zone: UTC+03:30 (IRST)
  - Summer (DST): UTC+04:30 (IRDT)
- Postal code: 93131–93491
- Area code: 051
- Website: neyshabur.ir
- Member of the LHC and the ICCN

Nishapur (Persian: نیشاپور) or Neyshabur (نیشابور, [ˌnejʃɒːˈbuːɹ]) (Note: Also romanized as Neyshapur, Nišâpur, and Nişapur. "Nishapur" is closer to its original and historic meaning, though it is less commonly used by modern native Persian speakers. In Persian poetry, the name of the city is written and pronounced as "نِشابور" (without the usage of "پ" or "ب"). In modern times and among the general public and the Persian mass media, "نیشابور" is the most commonly used pronunciation and spelling of the city, though "نیشاپور" is also correct. Officially (نیشابور), romanized as Neyshabur; also romanized as Nīshābūr, from Middle Persian: 𐭭𐭩𐭥𐭱𐭧𐭯𐭥𐭧𐭥𐭩, meaning "The New City of Shapur" or "The Fair Shapur") is a city in the Central District of Nishapur County, Razavi Khorasan province, Iran, serving as capital of both the county and the district.

Nishapur is the second most populous city of the province in the northeast of Iran, situated in a fertile plain at the foot of Binalud Mountain Range. It has been the historic capital of the Western Quarter of Khorasan, the historic capital of the 9th-century Tahirid dynasty, the initial capital of the 11th-century Seljuk Empire, and is currently the capital city of Nishapur County and a historic Silk Road city of cultural and economic importance in Iran and the Khorasan region.

Nearby are turquoise mines that have supplied the world with high quality turquoise for at least two millennia.

The city was founded in the 3rd century by Shapur I as a capital city of Sasanian satrapy known as Abarshahr or Nishapur. The city later became the capital of Tahirid dynasty and was reformed by Abdullah Tahir in 830, and later selected as the capital of Seljuk dynasty by Tughril in 1037. Nishapur had a territory of 17.6 hectares and 25,000 people in the 6th century, while by the year 1000, the population of the city was about 336,000 people with the territory of 1,680 hectares. From the Abbasid era to the Mongol invasion of Khwarezmia and Eastern Iran, the city evolved into a significant cultural, commercial, and intellectual center within the Islamic world. Nishapur, along with Merv, Herat and Balkh, was one of the four great cities of Khorasan and one of the greatest cities of the Old World in the Islamic Golden Age with strategic importance, a seat of governmental power in the eastern section of caliphates, a dwelling place for diverse ethnic and religious groups and a trading stop on commercial routes from Transoxiana, China, Iraq and Egypt.

Nishapur reached the height of its prosperity under the Samanids in the 10th century but was destroyed and most of its population was slaughtered by the Mongols in 1221. This massacre, combined with subsequent earthquakes and other invasions, is believed to have destroyed the city several times. Unlike its near neighbor Merv, Nishapur managed to recover from these cataclysmic events, and survive until the present day as an active modern city and county in tourism, agriculture, healthcare, industrial production and commerce in Razavi Khorasan Province of Iran; however, many of its older and historical archeological remains are left to be uncovered.

The modern city of Nishapur is composed of three main administrative areas/districts (Persian: منطقه های شهر نیشابور) and is surrounded by many villages which are joining in to the urban area and structure of the city. The Area/district 1 of the city comprises the newer urban developments (initiated mostly in the 1980s and the 1990s) made to the north of the Road 44 and is home to most of the main higher educational institutions of Nishapur such as the University of Neyshabur and the IAUN. The Area/district 2 of the city comprises the downtown of the city and the older and more historic urban structures situated on the south of the Road 44. It is home to some of the main tourist attractions of the city, such as the National Garden of Nishapur and the Khanate Mansion of Amin Islami. The Area/district 3 of the city is home to the ruins and the remains of the ancient city of Nishapur, destroyed by the Mongols in the Middle Ages, and is located in the south and the southeast of the city. The third district of the city is a national and registered protected archeological area by law and any unauthorized archeological excavation is considered illegal. This district is also home to the burial and historical monuments (some are shown on the city infobox) of most of the renowned persons of the city throughout history such as the Mausoleum of Omar Khayyám and the Mausoleum of Attar of Nishapur. The third district is also used as one of the main tourist hotspots of the city.

A carved steatite (soapstone) oil lamp from 9th–10th century Nishapur, Iran, currently held in The Metropolitan Museum of Art.

Many of this city's archeological discoveries are held and shown to the public in the Metropolitan Museum of Art in New York City, the British Museum in London, the National Museum of Iran in Tehran, other international museums and the museums of the city of Nishapur. The city of Nishapur is also a member of international organizations such as the LHC and the ICCN UNESCO.

== Etymology ==
The city of Nishapur gets its name from the Sassanian Persian king Shapur I, who founded the city in the 3rd century CE. The name “Nishapur” comes from Middle Persian (Pahlavi) words:

- “nēv / nish” – meaning new, good, or fair
- “Shapur” – the name of the king

So the name roughly means -“The new (or beautiful/good) city of Shapur.” The city was established by Shapur I as an administrative center of the Sasanian Empire in the region of Khorasan. In later centuries it became one of the most important cities of eastern Iran and a major center on the Silk Road.

Over time the name appeared in different forms in various languages:

- Nēv-Shāpūr / Nēshāpūr (Middle Persian)
- Naysābūr / Nisābūr (Arabic sources)
- Neyshabur / Nishapur (modern English spelling)

== History ==
=== Abarshahr of Sasanian Empire ===
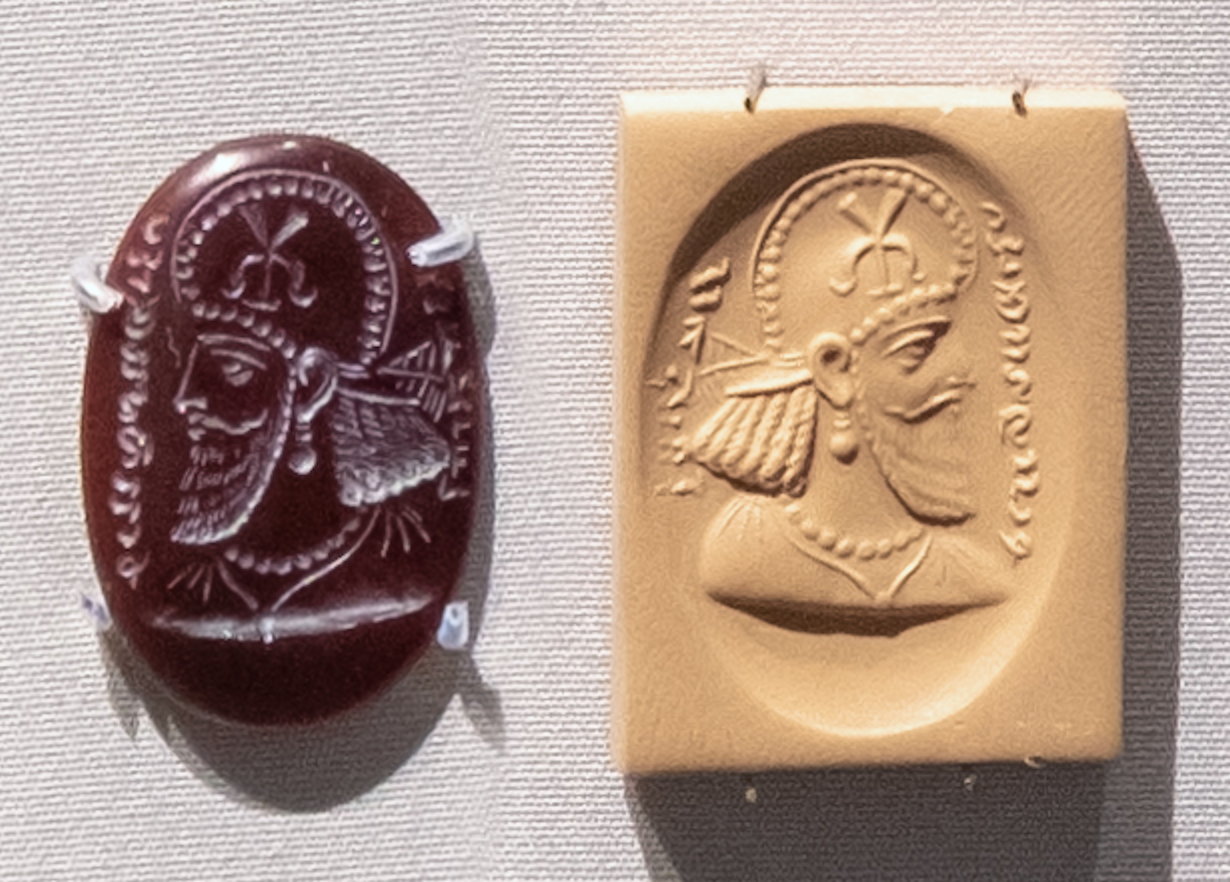
Sasanian seal with inscription in Pahlavi "Perozhormizd, son of the Kanarang", "Kanarang" being the Sasanian military commander of Abarshahr (Nishapur). The cap is decorated with a border of pearls. The title is attested from the 5th century CE. British Museum 134847.

Abarshahr was a satrapy (province) of the Sasanian Empire. Cities in the region were Candac, Artacauan, Apameia, and Pushang (founded by Shapur I). Nishapur was the capital. Abarshar was the name used for Nishapur during the Sasanian Empire and Rashidun Caliphate. The capital was a vital center of administration and of communications between Bactria, India, and Sagistan. The region was involved in the Indian and Chinese trade. Its governor bore the title of kanarang.

=== Names of Nishapur throughout history ===
- Abarshahr or Aparshahr was a satrapy (province) of the Sasanian Empire now located at Nishapur. Cities in the region were Candac, Artacauan, Apameia, and Pushang (founded by Shapur I), and the capital was Nishapur. Abarshar was the name of Nishapur during the Sasanian Empire and the Rashidun Caliphate. The capital was a vital center of administration and communication between Bactria, India, and Sagistan. The region was involved in trade with India and China. Its governor bore the unique title of kanarang.
- Neysabur or Naysabur was named Abarshahr during the Muslim occupation of Khorasan and Nishapur, and was the city's official name during the Rashidun Caliphate, Umayyad Caliphate, and Abbasid Caliphate.

=== Middle Ages ===
==== Muslim Conquest ====
Nishapur surrendered to the Rashidun Caliph Umar. Umar appointed Ahnaf ibn Qais as the chief commander of the Rashidun army out of Esfahan. From Esfahan, two routes led to Khorasan: the main route via Rey and the other via Nishapur. The people of Nishapur chose not to fight and surrendered on the condition of paying a tribute.

Having conquered the region around Nishapur, the Muslim force advanced to Nishapur itself. The city was divided into four sectors, with each sector under a Persian chief. These chiefs shut themselves in the city and closed the gates. The Muslims laid siege to the city for some days. In the meantime, the Persian chiefs quarreled among themselves. One of the chiefs entered into negotiations with the Muslims. He offered to open one of the gates for the Muslim army to enter, provided he was granted immunity. The Muslims accepted the offer. The Persians were taken by surprise, and the Muslims became the new rulers of Nishapur. After consolidating their position at Nishapur, the Muslims conquered other cities around Nishapur, including Pusht, Ashband, Rukh, Zar, Khaf, Osparain, and Arghian.

==== Capital of Abu Muslim ====
Abu Muslim became the governor of Khorasan, and chose Nishapur as his capital. He seems to have initiated a large-scale building program that stimulated the city's growth. Nishapur increased in importance, and two of the ‘Abbasids were governors of this city before becoming caliphs. It was the governor of Khurasan, Ali ibn Isa ibn Mahan, who presented a large gift of Jingdezhen porcelain to Harun al-Rashid, demonstrating the strategic importance of the province on trade routes.

==== Tahirid dynasty in Nishapur ====
The Tahirid dynasty was a dynasty of Persian dehqan origin that ruled from 820 to 872 in Khorasan, northeastern Greater Iran, a region now split between Iran, Afghanistan, Tajikistan, Turkmenistan, and Uzbekistan. The Tahirid capital was originally Merv, but Nishapur became their capital from 828 to 845. Although nominally subject to the Abbasid caliphate in Baghdad, the Tahirid rulers were effectively independent. The dynasty was founded by Tahir ibn Husayn, a leading general in the service of the Abbasid caliph Al-Ma'mun. Tahir's military victories were rewarded with the gift of lands in eastern Persia, which his successors subsequently extended as far as the borders of India. Tahirid influence extended to Baghdad when the Abbasids granted them the military affairs in Mesopotamia.

==== Saffarids/Samanids/Seljuks ====
In 873, the Tahirids were replaced by the Saffarids. Saffarids expanded their sphere of influence through the north of Khurasan and also in south towards Sistan. In late 875, the Saffarid Amir Ya'qub returned to Sistan. A former Tahirid soldier, Ahmad ibn Abdallah al-Khujistani, removed the Saffarid governor and had the khutba recited, recognizing Tahirid authority. According to the Tarikh-i Bayhaq, written by Ibn Funduq, many of Nishapur's ulama were killed by al-Khujistani. The Saffarids also made Nishapur their capital and rebuilt the Tahirid palace. In 900, Ismail Samani defeated the Saffarids and was made governor of Nishapur. The Samanids had been placed in power in Transoxiana by Caliph Al-Ma'mun, and ruled first from Samarqand and then moved to Bukhara. After defeating the Saffarids, their "empire", with nominal sanction from the Abbasids, extended from India to Iraq, making Nishapur a provincial capital. Khurasan was thus an international entrepôt, with merchants coming not only from Iraq, India and Egypt, but also from Russia; additionally, Vikings came from Scandinavia to trade with the Bulghars and Khazars on the Caspian Sea.

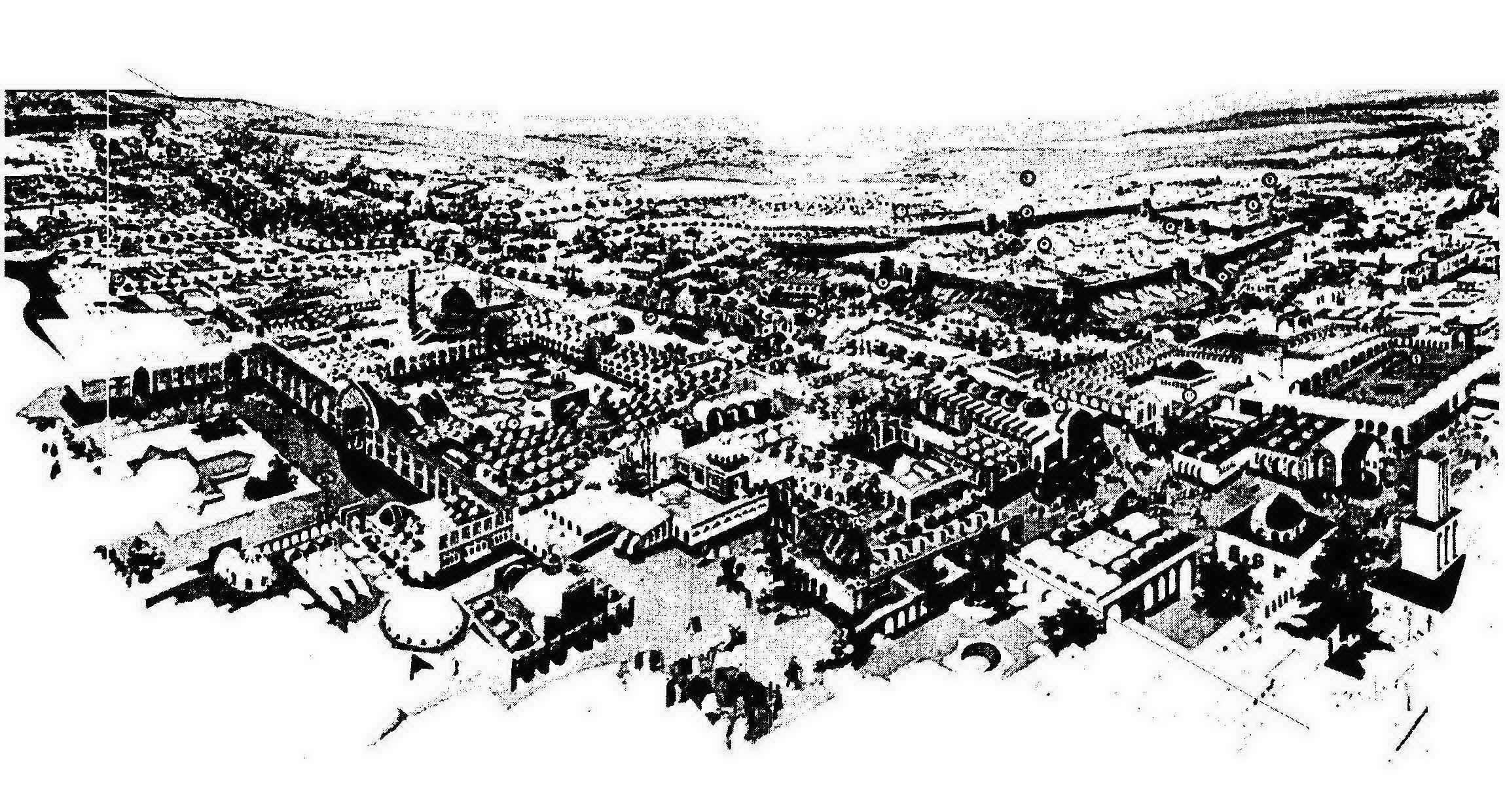
A modern reconstruction of Nishapur in the Middle Ages shown in the edited version of the book History of Nishapur held in the National Library of Iran.

Nishapur occupies an important strategic position astride the old Silk Road that linked Anatolia and the Mediterranean Sea with China. On the Silk Road, Nishapur has often defined the flexible frontier between the Iranian plateau and Central Asia. The town derived its name from its reputed founder, the Sassanian king Shapur I, who is said to have established it in the third century CE. Nearby are the turquoise mines that supplied the world with turquoise for at least two millennia.

It became an important town in the Khorasan region but subsequently declined in significance until a revival in its fortunes in the 9th century under the Tahirid dynasty, when the glazed ceramics of Nishapur formed an important item of trade to the west. For a time Nishapur rivaled Baghdad or Cairo: Toghrül, the first ruler of the Seljuk dynasty, made Nishapur his residence in 1038 and proclaimed himself sultan there, but it declined thereafter, as Seljuk fortunes were concentrated in the west. Nishapur was sacked by the Oghuz Turks in 1154, killing 30,000 people. Nishapur suffered several earthquakes in the twelfth and thirteenth centuries.

==== Siege of Nishapur ====
In 1221, after the death of Taghachar, the husband of Genghis Khan's daughter, the entire city of Nishapur was destroyed by the Mongols over the course of 10 days. Genghis Khan's daughter requested the death of every resident of the city as vengeance for her husband's death. In order to be sure that no wounded would survive the massacre, the Khan's troops killed and beheaded most of the population of the city, and their skulls were reputedly piled in pyramids by the Mongols. Women, Infants, children, and even cats and dogs were among the beheaded. It is estimated that potentially up to 1,747,000 people were slaughtered.

After the massacre, a much smaller settlement was established just north of the ancient town, and the once bustling metropolis lay underground—until a team of excavators from the Metropolitan Museum of Art arrived in the mid-20th century. They worked at Nishapur between 1935 and 1940, returning for a final season in the winter of 1947–48. What remains of old Nishapur is a 3500-hectare "Kohandejh (Persian: کهن دژ)" area, south of the current city of Nishapur.

==== Ilkhanate and Timurid reign ====
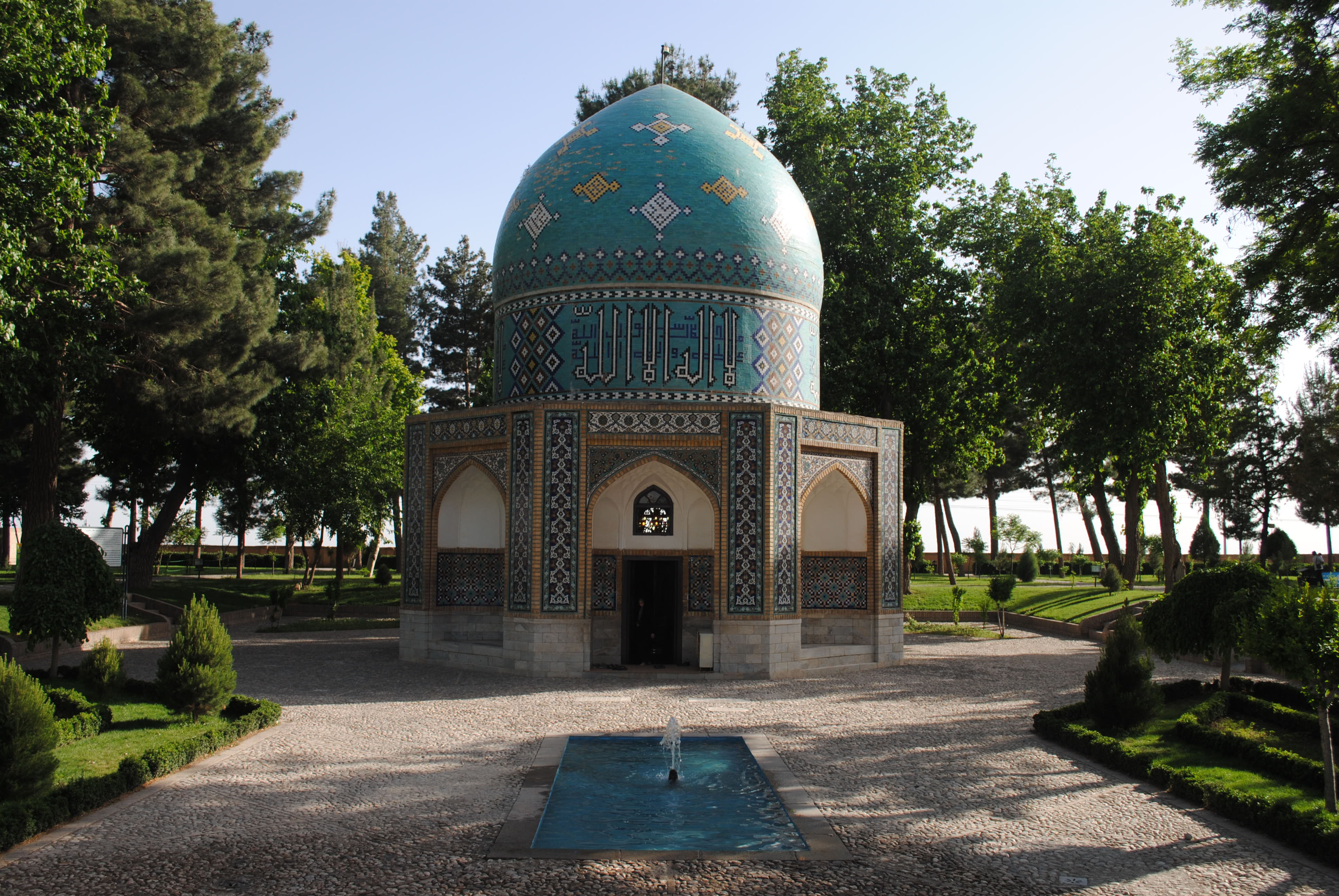
Tomb of Attar of Nishapur was built during the Timurid era (Built by the order of Ali-Shir Nava'i). Mausoleum of Attar of Nishapur is in the southern part of the city of Nishapur. Attar has had a profound influence on Sufism and Persian literature.

After the fall of Nishapur to the Mongols in 1221, the city's structures were weakened, and its agricultural output declined. Mahmud Ghazan and Abu Sa'id Bahadur Khan tried to make the city flourish again, and the city's population grew once more, and some of the villages around the city were improved and rebuilt. Hamdallah Mustawfi had visited the city of Nishapur in the Year 1339 or 1340. During this era, the ambassador of Henry III of Castile, Ruy González de Clavijo reached Nishapur and according to him, Nishapur had become a highly productive agricultural center with 40 non-stop working mills along the ''Abe Bostan'' (Mir Ab River of Nishapur). The current position of the city was formed during this era and on the North West of the older position of the city which is now home to the Mausoleum of Attar of Nishapur and Shadiyakh Archeological Site and other remains of the old position of the city (the old position of the city is also now a protected archeological site by law though it is endangered). The Mausoleum of Attar of Nishapur and the Jameh Mosque of Nishapur (congregational mosque of the city) are among the buildings built during this era in Nishapur. Many poets, scholars, and renowned historical figures of the city and the wider region of Abarshahr (one of the four main regions of Khorasan, with the city capitals of Nishapur, Merv, Herat, and Balkh) were also born in this period.

=== Early modern era ===
==== Safavid Era (16th to early 18th century) ====
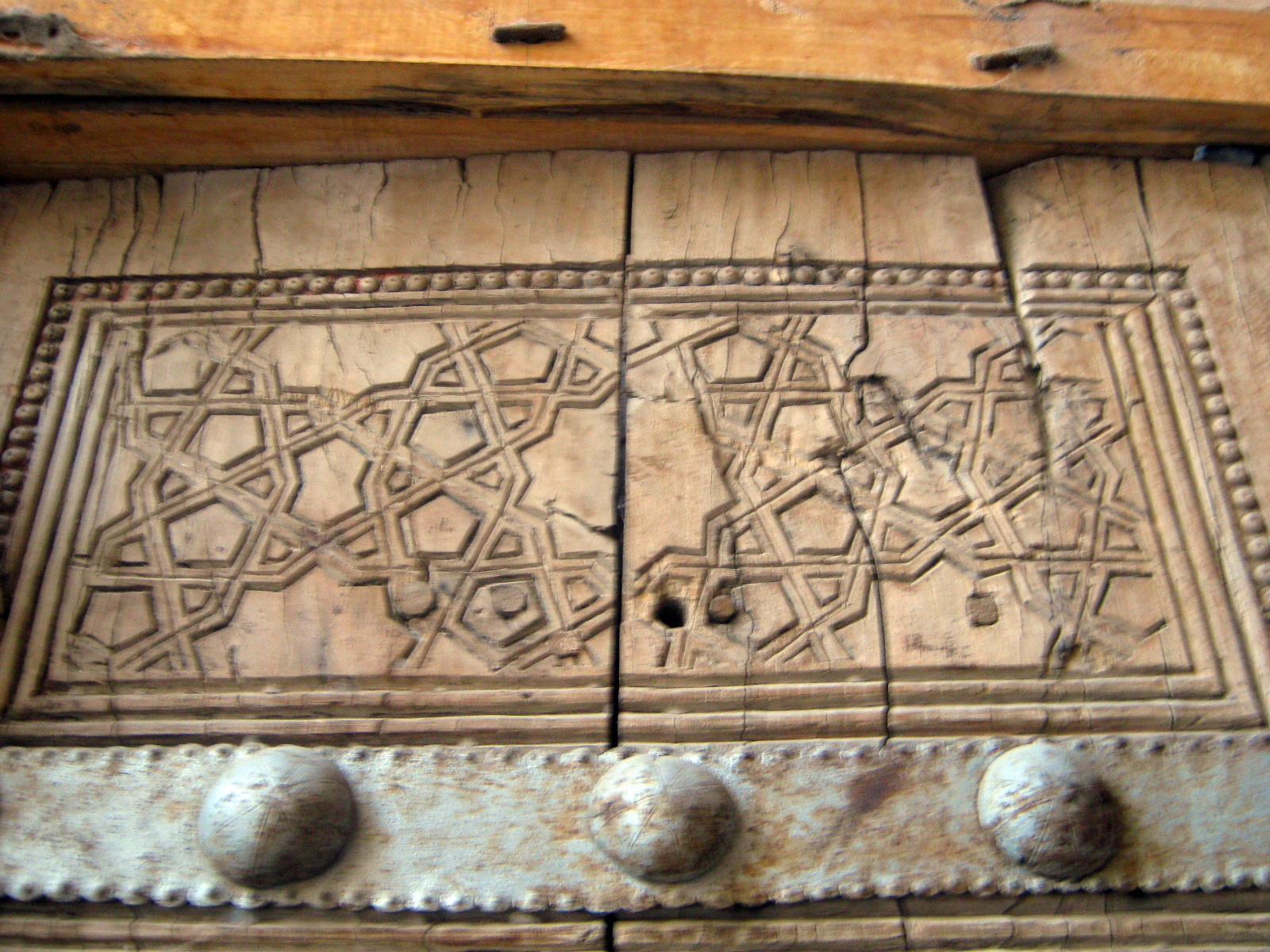
A decorated door with arabesque dating back to the Safvid Persia in Shah Abassi Caravanseray of Nishapur

Due to a conflict between the supporters of the Mohammad Khodabanda, the Safavid Shah of Persia, and his son Abbas the Great. In 1581, the castle of Nishapur went under siege. This siege was one of the events that helped Abbas the Great become the ruler of Khorasan and later the Shah of Persia in the Safavid Empire. In 1592, Abbas the Great took back the control of Nishapur from the Shaybanids. Shah Abbasi Caravanseri of Nishapur was also built during his reign, and later on, he left his two epigraphs on Jame Mosque of Nishapur on the Ramadan of October 1612.

Saadat Ali Khan I Nishapuri, Nawab of Awadh (the ruler who governed the state of Awadh of India), was also born in this period in an influential family in Nishapur.

==== Independence and Qajar Era (18th & 19th century) ====
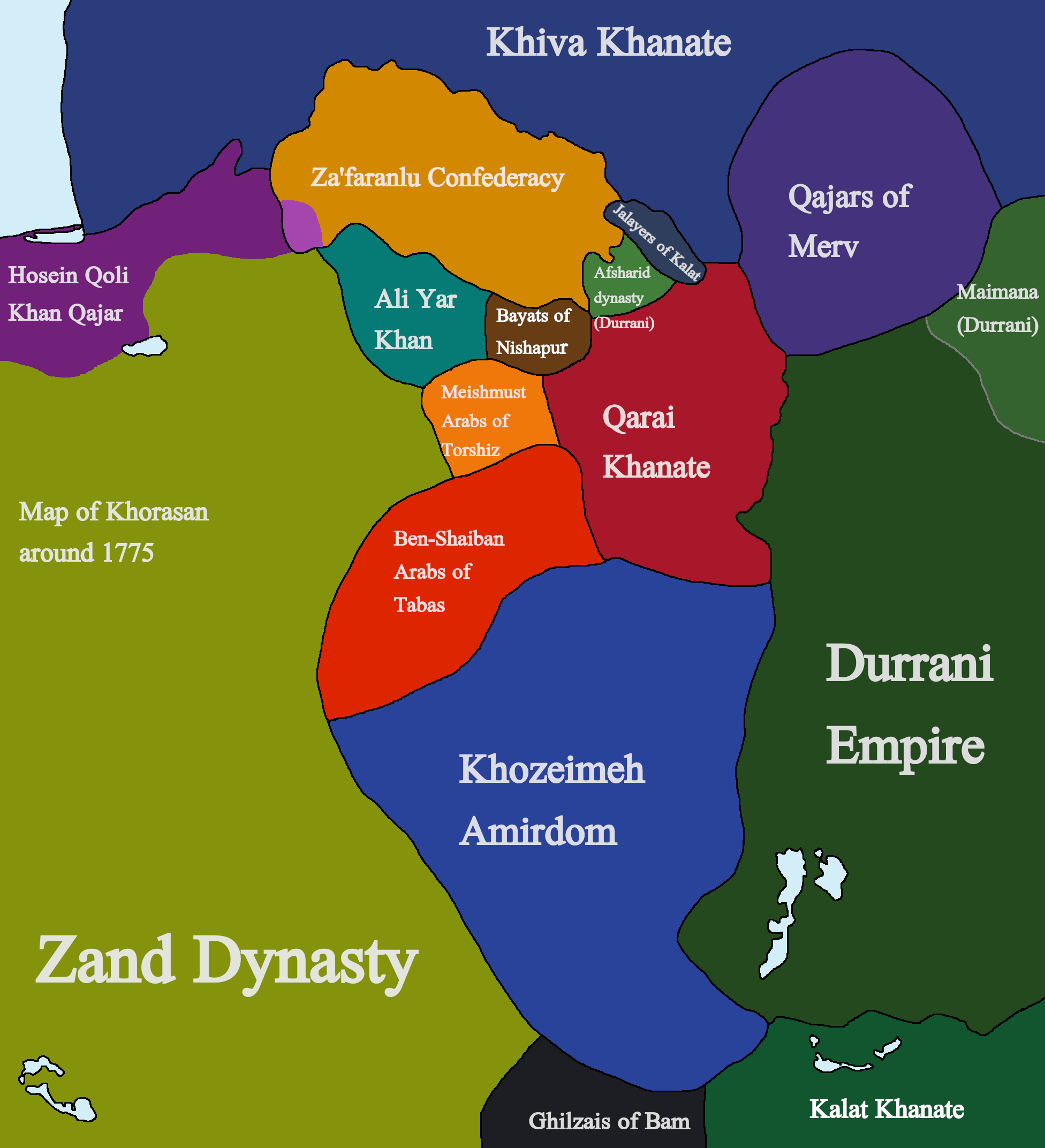
A map of Khorasan and Khanate of Nishapur in 1775 after the death of Nader Shah

After the death of Nader Shah Afshar in 1747, the area became an independent khanate under the reign of the Bayat chieftains. In 1754 Ahmad Shah Durrani captured Nishapur with the support of heavy artillery and imposed Shahrokh Shah as the ruler (Shah) of the western part of Khorasan as a protectorate of the Durrani Empire.

The city was conquered in 1800 by the Qajars. In 1828, the city came under the influence of the Zafaranlu Confederacy but was given back to the Qajars in 1829. During the Revolt of Hasan Khan Salar, the city was an isolated outpost of Qajar rule led by Imamverdi Khan Bayat when most of Khorasan was under the wrath of Hasan Khan Salar. On March 21, 1849, Qajar forces entered Nishapur.

=== Contemporary history ===
==== Pahlavi dynasty ====
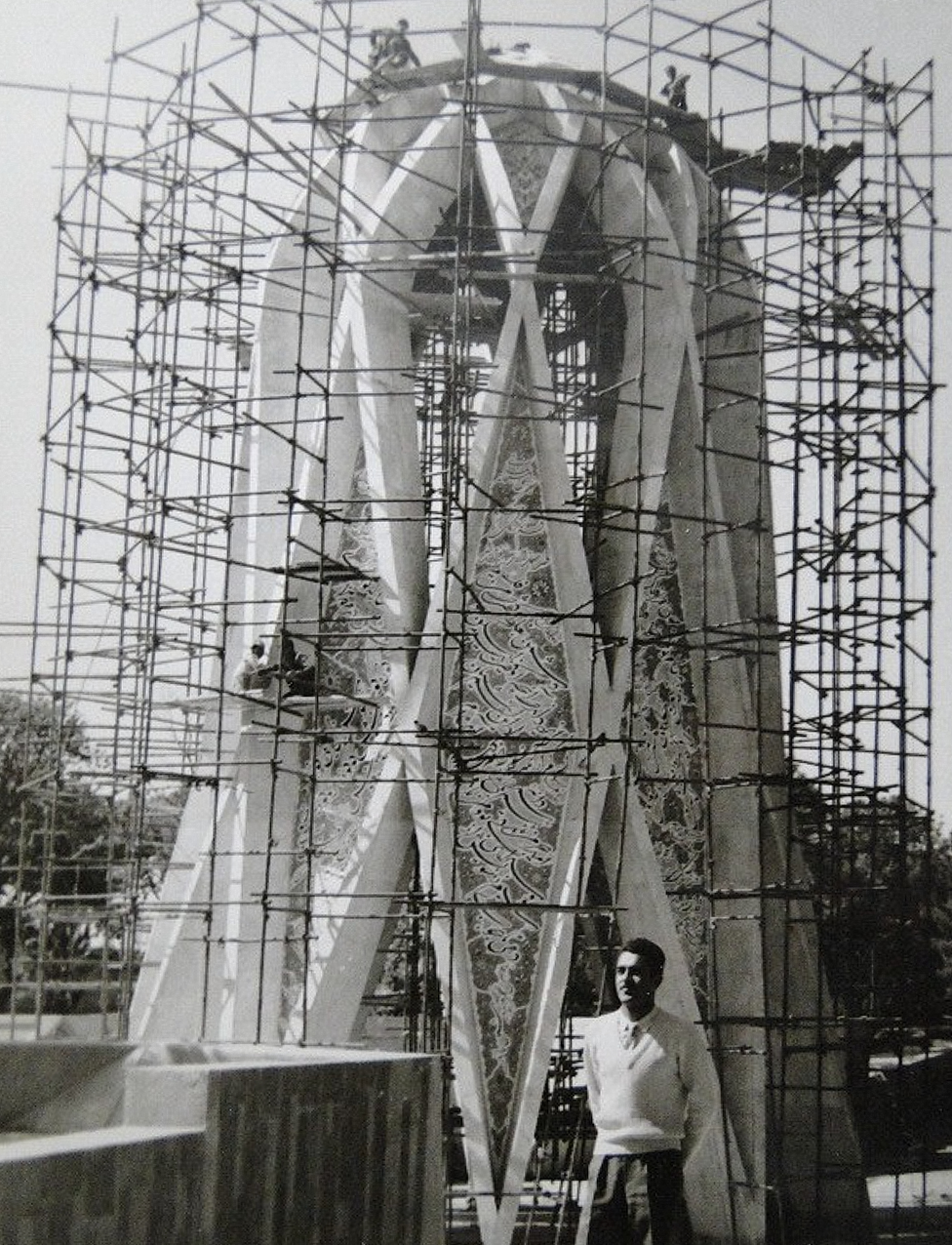
A picture of the construction of Mausoleum of Omar Khayyam, on top of the Headstone of Omar Khayyam. This mausoleum was designed by Hooshang Seyhoun in the 20th century.

The reconstruction of the Mausoleum of Omar Khayyam in Nishapur was commissioned by Reza Shah. Omar's previous tomb was separated from his tomb, and a white marble monument (Current Mausoleum), designed by the Iranian architect Hooshang Seyhoun, was erected over it. This mausoleum became one of the main symbols of the city and one of the known works of the modern Persian architecture. The influence of the architectural design of this mausoleum is visible on the coat of arms of the University of Neyshabur, Neyshabur University of Medical Sciences (NUMS), and other public, civil, and private organizations of the city. The construction of the new mausoleum was completed in the year 1963. The Tomb of Kamal-ol Molk was also built in Nishapur and designed by Seyhoun. The Wooden Mosque of Neyshabur was also built in the year 2000.

The Second Asia-Pacific Jamboree was held at Baghrud Scots Park of Nishapur in preparation for The 15th World Scout Jamboree which was scheduled to be held 15–23 July 1979 in Nishapur but due to the political uncertainty of the Iranian Revolution in the country, the event was cancelled.

==== Post Iranian revolution ====
On February 18, 2004, in the Nishapur train disaster, a train carrying flammable goods derailed and caught fire near the town. Five hours later, during firefighting and rescue work, a massive explosion destroyed the train and many nearby buildings. Around 300 people were said to have been killed, mainly fire and rescue workers, but also the local governor, mayor, and the heads of the fire and rail services. This disaster has become known as one of the worst railway industry disasters of the world.

==== Archaeological discoveries ====
Little archaeology has been done on this vast and complicated site. George Curzon remarked that Nishapur had been destroyed and rebuilt more times than any other city in history, an evocative statement, whether or not it is statistically true. The Metropolitan Museum of Art undertook excavations from 1935 that were interrupted in 1940. Searching largely for museum-worthy trophies that they shared with the government of the Shah, the Metropolitan's publications were limited to its own Nishapur ceramics. The site of Nishapur has been ransacked for half a century since World War II, to feed the international market demand for early Islamic works of art.

Shadiyakh ("Palace of Happiness") was one of the main palaces of old Nishapur up to the 9th century AD, which became more important and populated after that. Some notable people like Attar lived there. Attar's tomb is nowadays in that area. This palace was perhaps completely ruined in the 13th century.

25 kilometers west of Nishapur lies the ruined castle (Qal'eh) of Tuzandeh Jan-e Kohneh, near the village of the same name. The fortress was active from the Parthian and Sasanian to the early Islamic period. A limited survey of the site was carried out by Mahmoud Mousavi in 1986 which yielded Sasanian and 12th Century Islamic ceramics, as well as a couple of bronze objects. The site has since been partially destroyed by farming activity.

== Demographics ==
=== Population ===
At the time of the 2006 National Census, the city's population was 205,972 in 56,652 households. The following census in 2011 counted 239,185 people in 71,263 households. The 2016 census measured the population of the city as 264,375 people in 83,143 households. It is the third most-populous city in the eastern provinces of Iran after Mashhad and Zahedan.

== Geography ==
Nishapur is located at an elevation of 1250 meters on a wide fertile plain at the southwestern foot of the Binalud Mountain range in northcentral Razavi Khorasan Province. The city is connected by both railways and highways to the cities of Mashhad and Tehran. The city also has local routes and highways to the cities of Kashmar and Quchan.

=== Sources of the Middle Ages ===
Throughout the Middle Ages, Nishapur had been praised by many due to its many gardens and its healthy climate in Khorasan. Ibn Hawqal has commented the following about the weather and the climate of this city at that time:

Throughout all of Khorasan, no such companion as enriched with the health of the air, quantity, and the vastness of its mansions can be found.

In the same cited work, Hakim Nishapuri praises Nishapur with many favourable nicknames such as "Persian: نیشابورست، هوای او صافی به صحت آبدان وافی، خالی از خطایا و عاری از وبا و اکثر بلایا… عروس بلدان، خزانه خراسان، دار امارت، لطیف عمارت، موطن ادیبان…" and compares and claims that the weather and climate (or air Persian: هوا) of Nishapur was better and more healthier (according to him, cholera and other such diseases and disasters could not be found in Nishapur) than many neighboring regions such as Sistan (due to its winds), Indus valley (or سند in Persian) and Hindustan (due to their severe hotness), Khwarazm and Turkestan (due to their coldness) and Merv (due to presence of many insects).

=== Modern ===
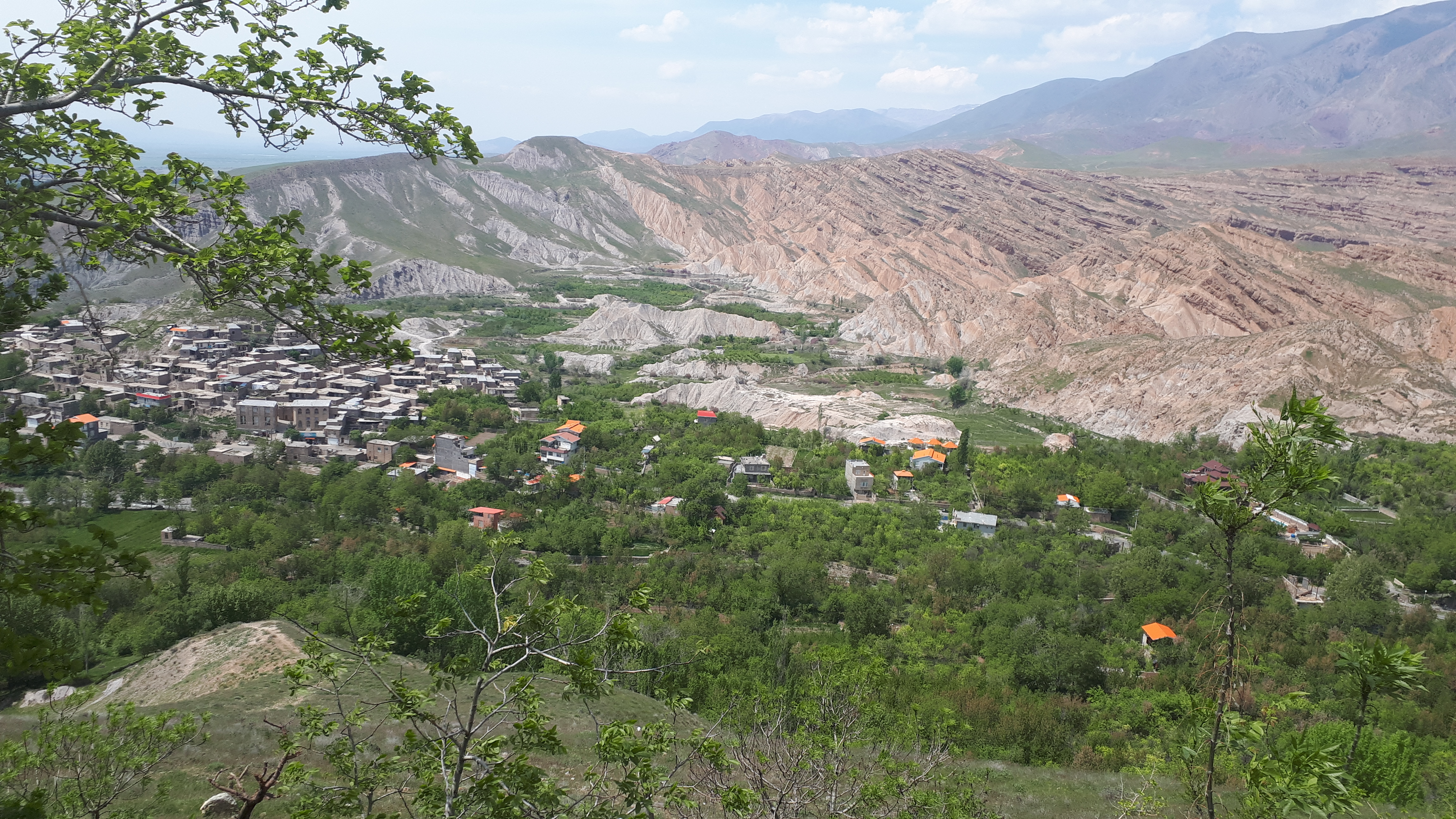
A view of Buzhan, a village and a tourist hot-spot near the east-north of the city of Nishapur, April 2019.

Nishapur generally has a warm and semi-dry climate called ''central Iranian plateau climate''. Precipitation mostly happens in spring and winter. Nishapur is situated on a relatively higher elevation (1250 meters) than its neighboring cities, such as Sabzevar and Mashhad, hence the weather is milder and better than these cities.

=== Climate ===
Nishapur has a cold semi-arid climate (BSk).

Climate data for Neyshaboor (1991–2010)
Month	Jan	Feb	Mar	Apr	May	Jun	Jul	Aug	Sep	Oct	Nov	Dec	Year
Record high °C (°F)	18.0 (64.4)	24.2 (75.6)	29.4 (84.9)	33.2 (91.8)	38.0 (100.4)	41.4 (106.5)	41.6 (106.9)	42.8 (109.0)	38.6 (101.5)	33.6 (92.5)	28.0 (82.4)	24.2 (75.6)	42.8 (109.0)
Mean daily maximum °C (°F)	7.2 (45.0)	10.1 (50.2)	15.4 (59.7)	22.1 (71.8)	27.4 (81.3)	32.8 (91.0)	34.8 (94.6)	33.8 (92.8)	29.9 (85.8)	24.0 (75.2)	16.2 (61.2)	10.1 (50.2)	22.0 (71.6)
Daily mean °C (°F)	1.8 (35.2)	4.4 (39.9)	8.9 (48.0)	14.8 (58.6)	19.3 (66.7)	24.1 (75.4)	26.1 (79.0)	24.5 (76.1)	20.3 (68.5)	15.1 (59.2)	9.0 (48.2)	4.3 (39.7)	14.4 (57.9)
Mean daily minimum °C (°F)	−3.5 (25.7)	−1.4 (29.5)	2.4 (36.3)	7.5 (45.5)	11.3 (52.3)	15.3 (59.5)	17.4 (63.3)	15.3 (59.5)	10.7 (51.3)	6.1 (43.0)	1.7 (35.1)	−1.4 (29.5)	6.8 (44.2)
Record low °C (°F)	−25.0 (−13.0)	−22.0 (−7.6)	−15.8 (3.6)	−3.8 (25.2)	−0.6 (30.9)	6.8 (44.2)	10.6 (51.1)	3.6 (38.5)	0.8 (33.4)	−7.6 (18.3)	−8.6 (16.5)	−13.0 (8.6)	−25.0 (−13.0)
Average precipitation mm (inches)	34.8 (1.37)	35.8 (1.41)	57.1 (2.25)	31.9 (1.26)	19.3 (0.76)	5.5 (0.22)	1.4 (0.06)	0.0 (0.0)	1.1 (0.04)	3.6 (0.14)	18.0 (0.71)	29.7 (1.17)	238.2 (9.39)
Average relative humidity (%)	72	67	61	55	45	32	29	28	33	43	58	71	50
Mean monthly sunshine hours	153.5	174.0	190.8	232.3	301.5	340.6	368.9	358.7	313.7	278.1	211.3	164.1	3,087.5
Source: Iran Meteorological Organization

=== Geology ===
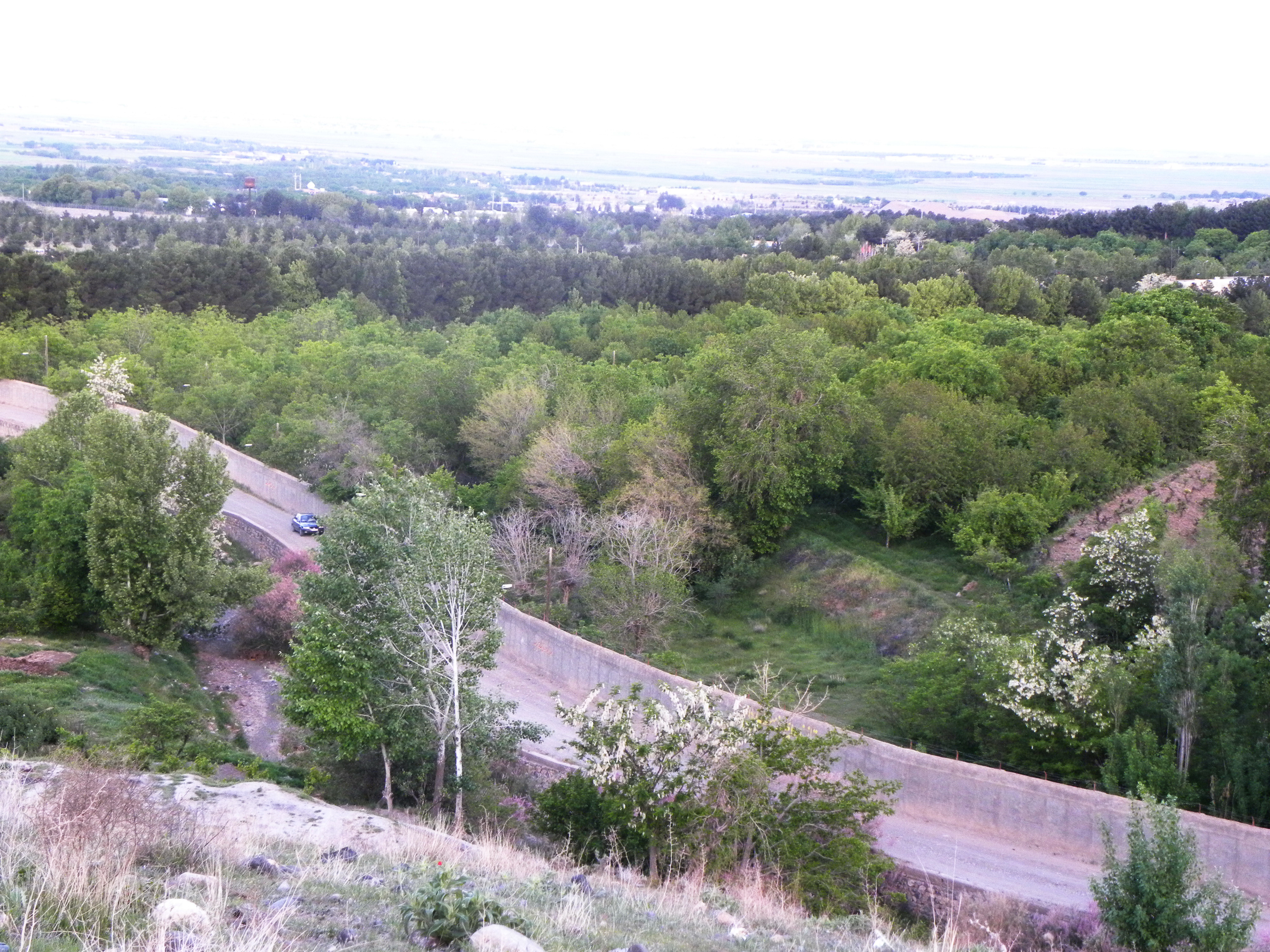
Nature of Nishapur, near Binalud Mountain Range

The city of Nishapur lies on a Holocene alluvial plain on top of the Pleistocene sediments in the southwestern part of the Binalud Mountains. The Binalud Range, running northwest–southeast, is made predominantly of Triassic and Jurassic rocks. On the southern side of the northwestern part of the range, there is a section of Eocene rocks that are volcanic in origin. The well-known Nishabur turquoise comes from the weathered and broken trachytes and andesites of the Eocene volcanic rocks of this part of the mountain range. The main turquoise mines are situated about 50 kilometers northwest of the city of Nishapur in the foothills of the Binalud Range.

=== Seismicity ===
Nishapur is located in a region with a rather high risk of earthquakes. Many earthquakes have seriously harmed the city; among the important ones are the historical earthquakes that ruined the city in the 12th and 13th centuries.

== Economy ==
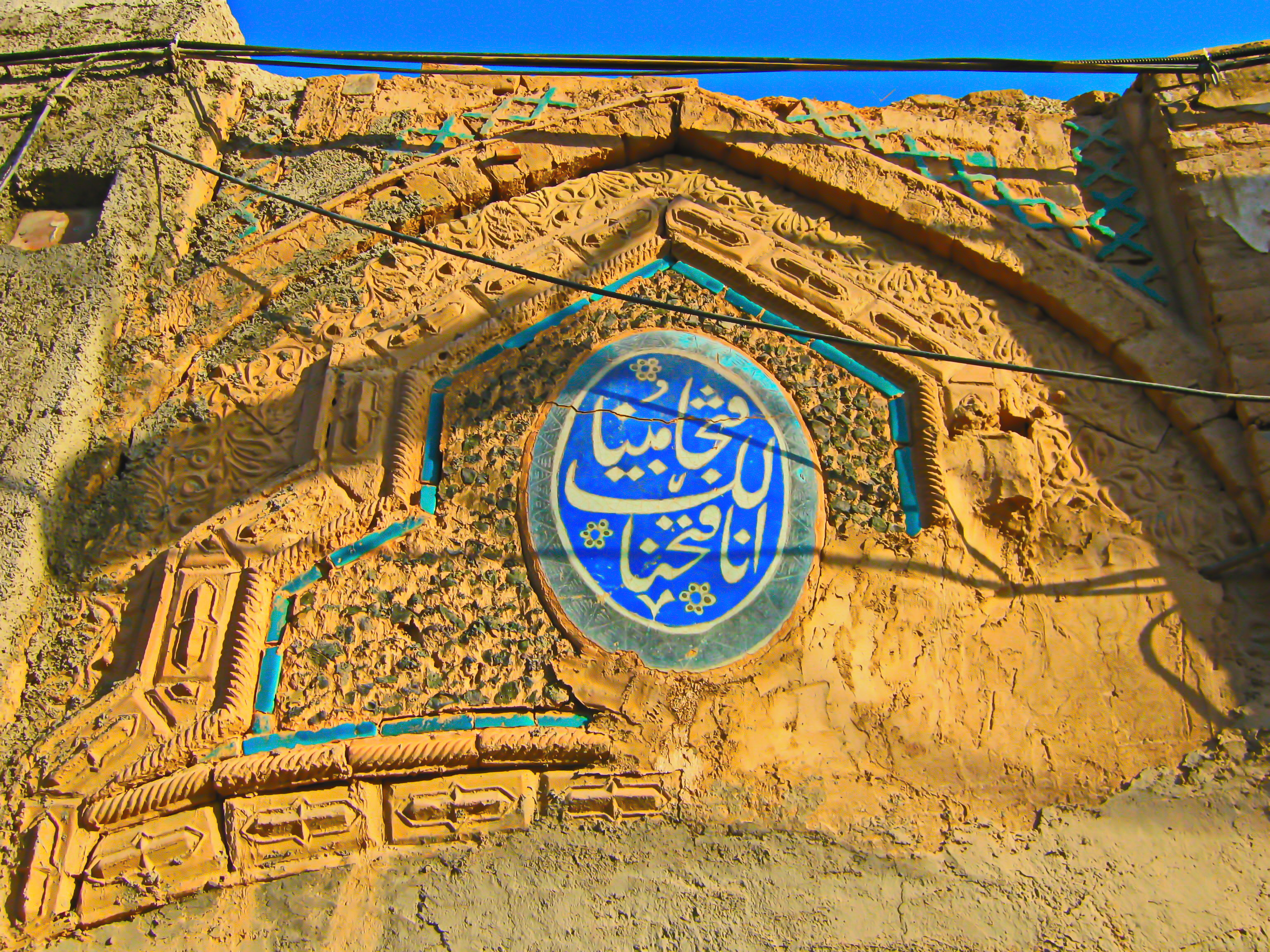
Portal of an old store in 2013, Roofed Bazaar of Nishapur

The economy of Nishapur is diverse and it is based on several industries like Agriculture, Industrial parks, mining, tourism, health care, retailing, banking, etc.

=== Food & Agriculture ===
Many agricultural products such as saffron, cereals, cotton, herbs, plums, walnut, wheat, corn, apples, cherries and pistachio are exported from the county of Nishapur. The city is also a dairy and sugar exporter.

==== Water supply ====
Most of the water supply of the city is provided from the Binalud Mountain Range's mostly seasonal rivers, qanats, dams, and modern wells.

=== Mining ===
Natural recourses such as turquoise and salt are mined from around the city.

=== Energy ===
The electrical power supply of the city is provided from Neyshabur Combined Cycle Power Plant and Binalood Wind Farm. The excessive electrical energy of the city is mostly exported from the city's public power grid.

=== Industry ===
Khorasan Steel Complex and two main industrial parks called the Khayyam Industrial Park and the Attar Industrial Park are near the city of Nishapur. Many industrial products such as sugar, cooking oils, and gas heaters are exported from the city and its county.

=== Tourism ===
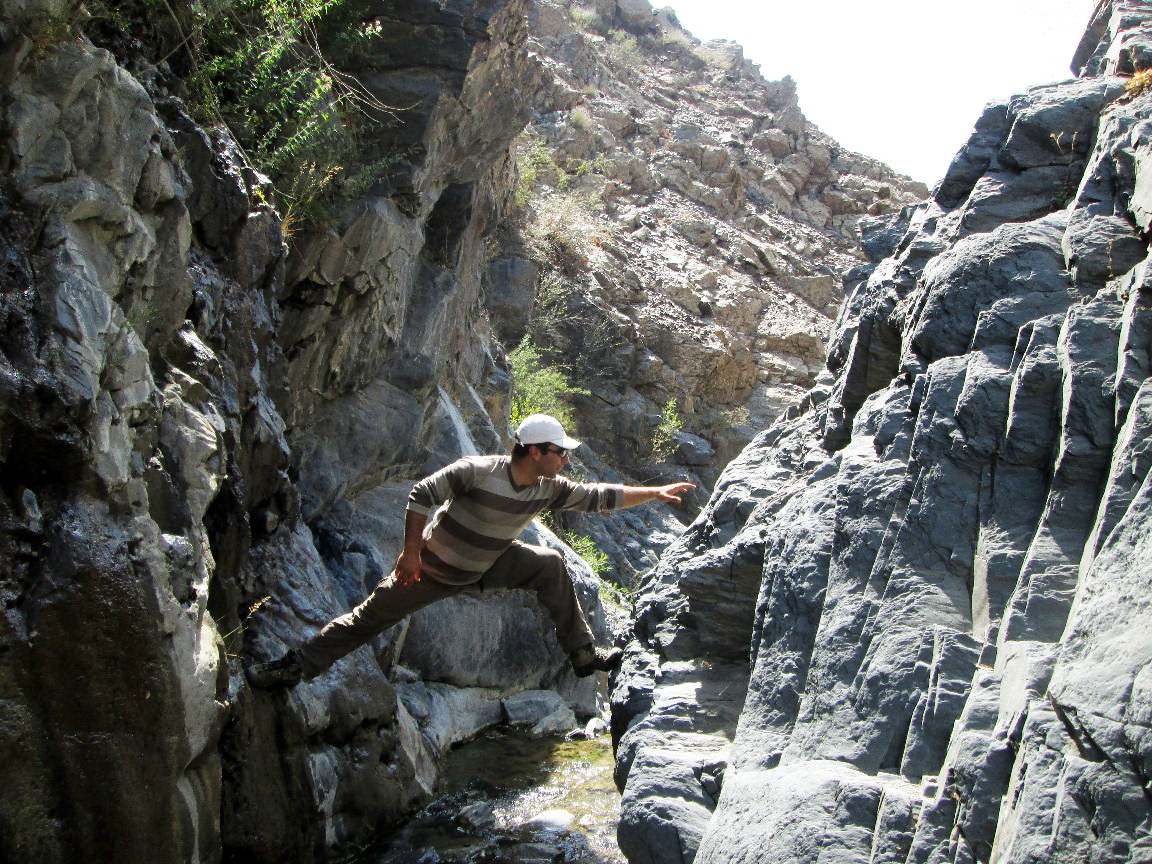
A rock climber in Nishapur

Several hotels, ecolodges, resorts, parks, tourist hot-spots, restaurants, museums, a planetarium, cultural centers, mausoleums, religious pilgrimage sites, and historic mosques are in and near the city. The tourism industry of the city has a lot of potential, but it needs further development.

=== Health care ===
There are two active hospitals (Hakim Hospital and 22 Bahman Hospital) in the city of Nishapur, and a third one is currently under construction.

=== Banks ===
Nearly all public and private Iranian banks have branches in the city.

=== Companies ===
Major Iranian companies such as Refah Chain Stores Co., Iran Hyper Star, Ofoqh Kourosh, and other companies have active branches in Nishapur.

== Transportation ==
=== Road 44 ===
Road 44

Road 44, a major national expressway that connects the two major cities of Tehran and Mashhad, is connected to the city of Nishapur and it passes through it.

=== Rail transport ===
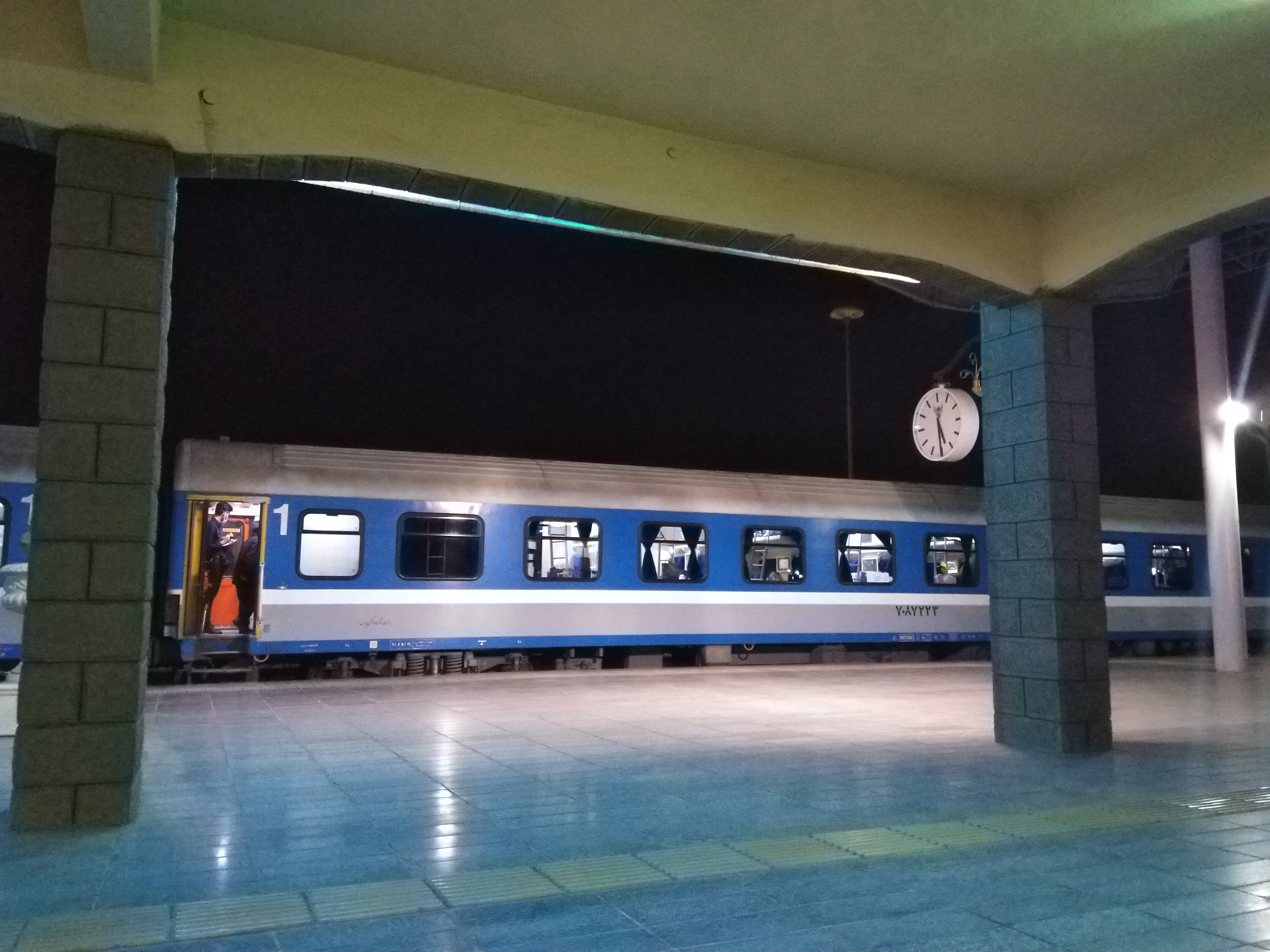
A passenger train in Nishapur train station

Nishapur is connected to the Trans-Iranian Railway System, which is a UNESCO world heritage. The Nishapur train station became operational during the reign of Mohammad Reza Pahlavi, and it is located in the southern part of the city.

==== Nishapur train disaster ====
On 18 February 2004, runaway train wagons crashed into the village of Khayyam near Nishapur. This accident caused several major explosions and killed over 300. The entire village of Khayyam was destroyed due to the explosions.

=== Public transport ===
The intercity bus terminal of the city is located in the eastern part of the city, close to the road 44. Several public bus lines and stations are also active within the city.

=== Airport ===
Currently there is only one airport near the north of the city that is only authorized to be used for gliders and small aircraft however, there are plans for building a proper airport near the south of the city of Nishapur.

== Notable people ==
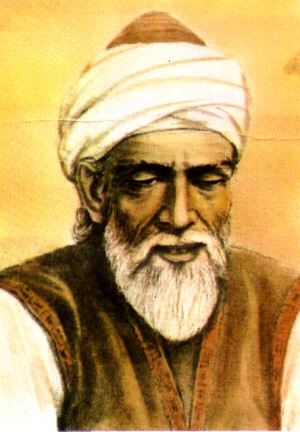
Abul al-Wafa Buzjani

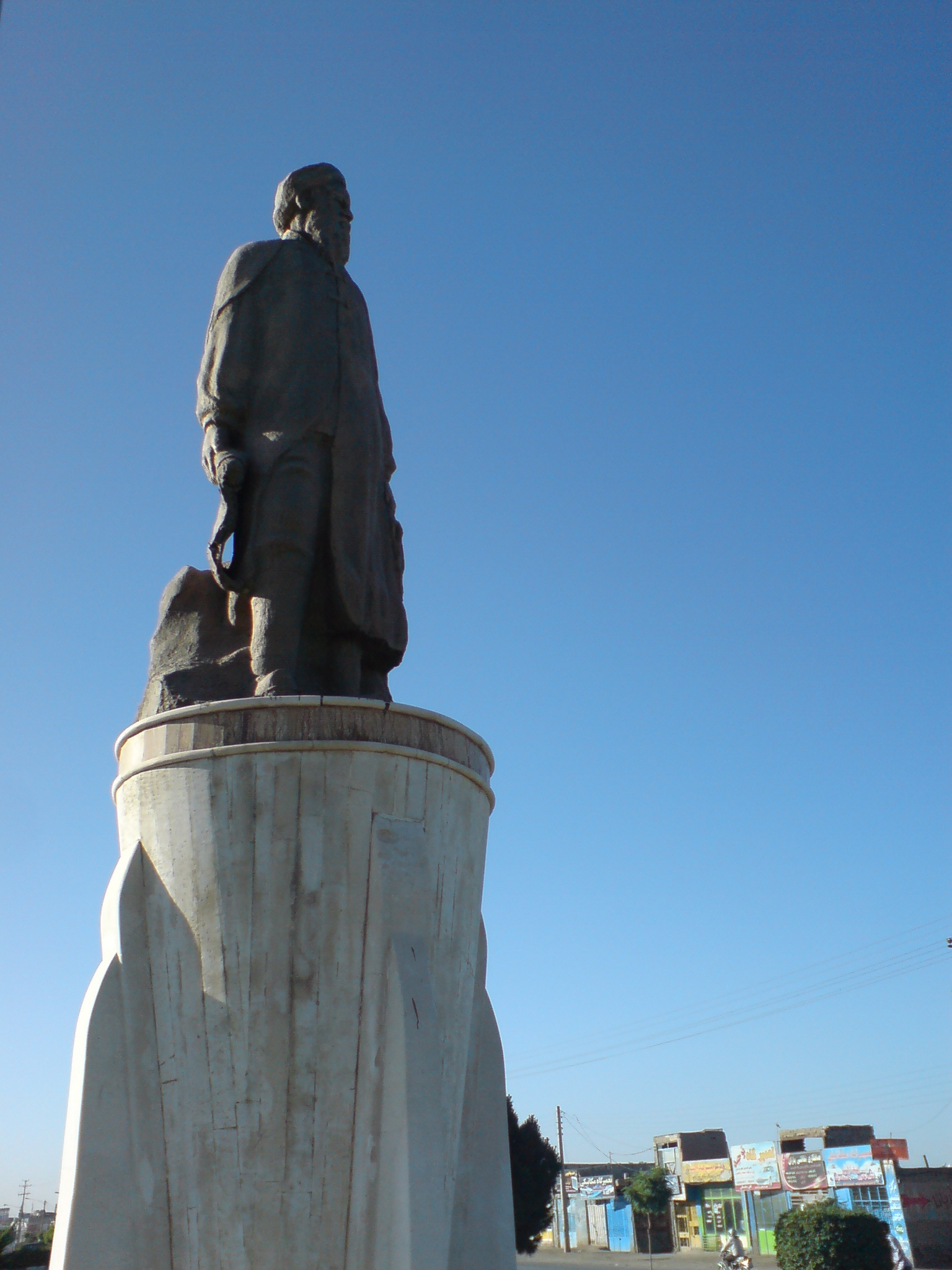
Abū-Sa'id Abul-Khayr

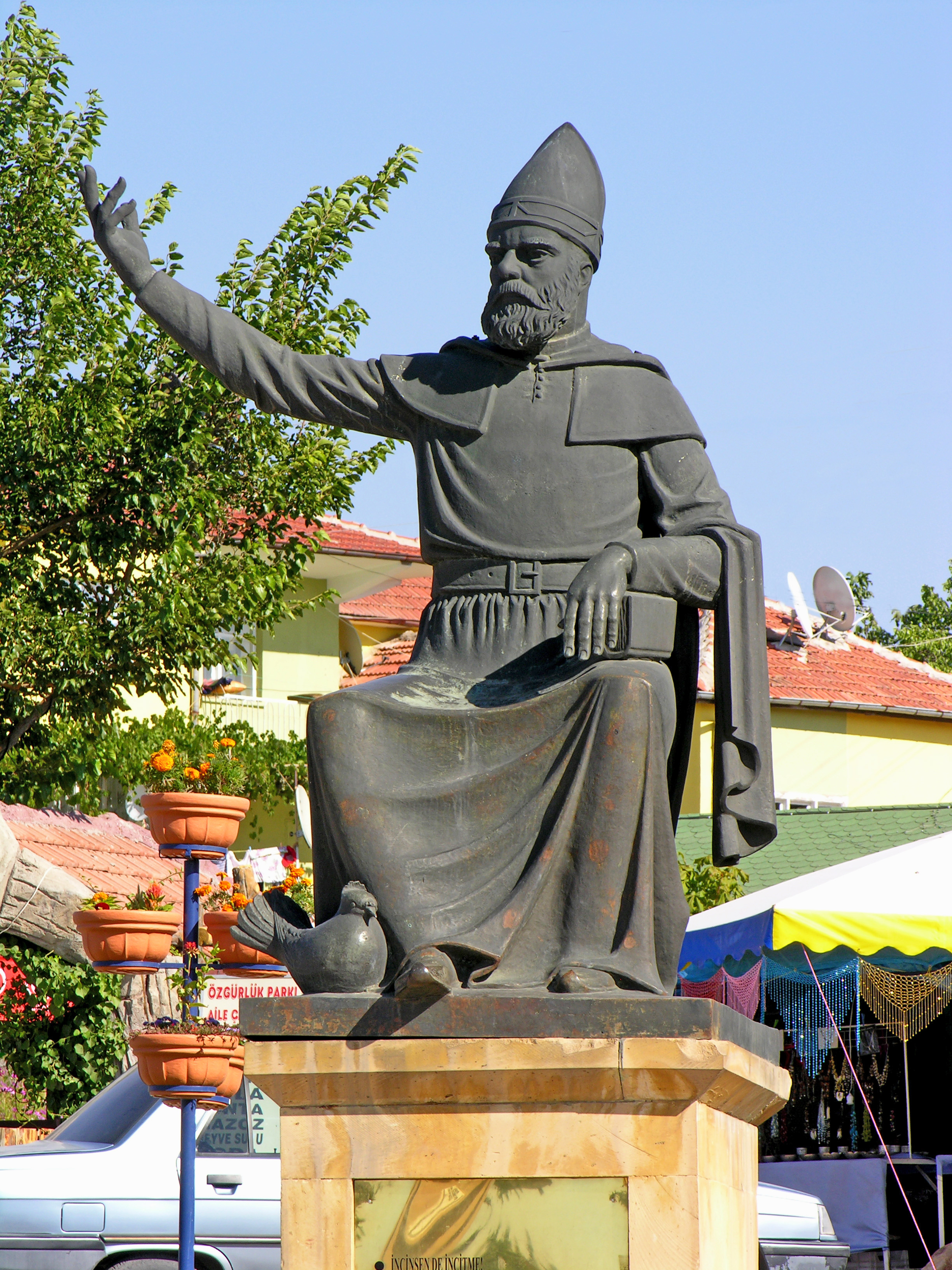
Haji Bektash Veli

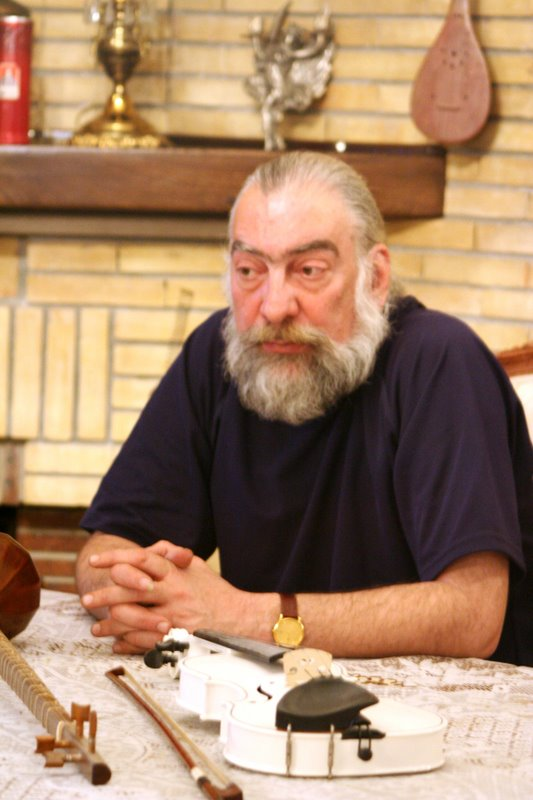
Parviz Meshkatian

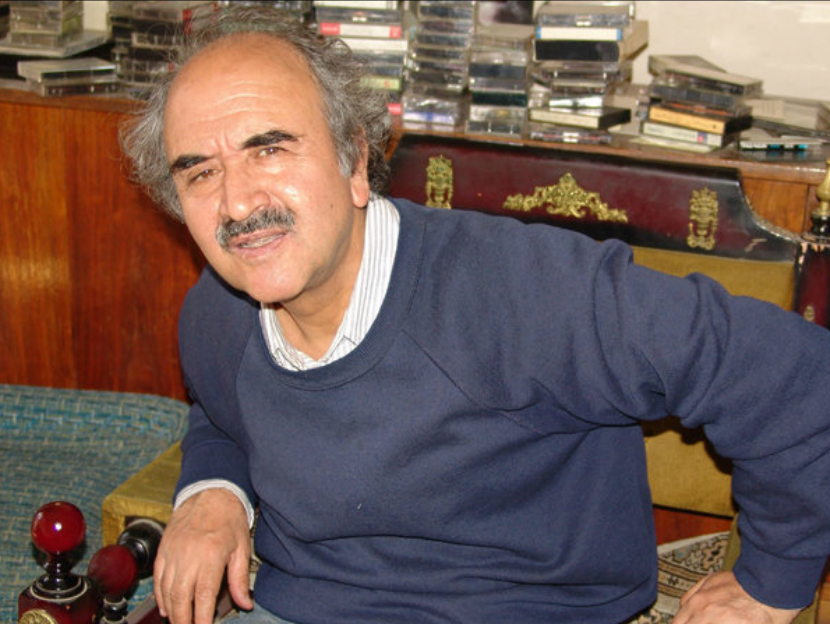
Mohammad-Reza Shafiei Kadkani

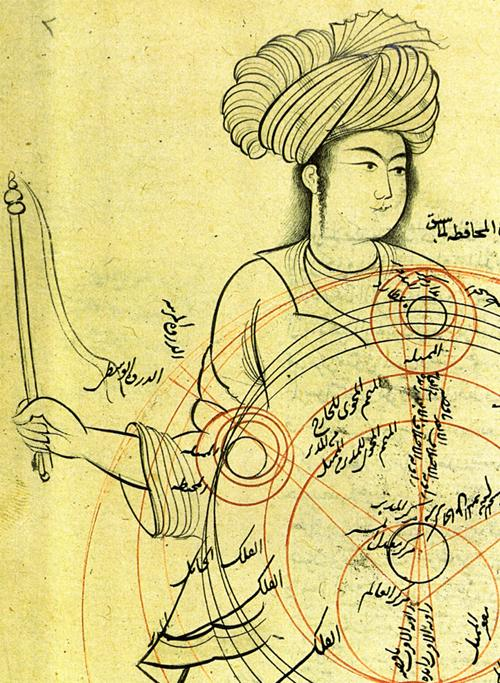
Abu al-Abbas Iranshahri

Sorted by date

- Mazdak – (died c. 524 or 528) was a Zoroastrian prophet, Iranian reformer and religious activist
- Kanarang – was a unique title in the Sasanian army, given to the commander of the Sasanian Empire's northeastern most frontier province, Abarshahr (encompassing the cities of Tus, Nishapur and Abiward).
- Behafarid – was an 8th-century Persian Zoroastrian heresiarch
- Sunpadh – (died 755) cleric
- Ishaq Ibn Rahwayh – muhaddith, faqih
- Abu al-Abbas Iranshahri – 9th-century philosopher, mathematician, natural scientist, historian of religion, astronomer and author
- Ibn Khuzaymah – Muslim scholar
- Muslim ibn al-Hajjaj – Muslim scholar and one of the most prominent muhaddith in history
- Abu Hafs Amr Haddad – (died 879) was a sufi and blacksmith
- Abu al-Hassan al-Amiri – (died 992) was a Muslim theologian and philosopher
- Abū al-Wafā' Būzjānī – (10 June 940 – 15 July 998) was a mathematician and astronomer
- Hakim al-Nishaburi – (933–1012), was a Sunni scholar and historian
- Ahmad ibn Ibrahim al-Naysaburi – Isma'ili theologian and historian
- Tha'ālibī – (961–1038), Muslim philologist, writer and poet
- Ahmad ibn 'Imad al-Din – was a Persian physician and alchemist. He was probably from Nishapur in the 11th century.
- Ibn Abi Sadiq – was an 11th-century Persian physician
- Abū-Sa'īd Abul-Khayr – (December 7, 967 – January 12, 1049) was a famous Persian Sufi and poet
- Al-Juwayni (1028–1085 CE) was a Sunni Shafi'i Faqih and Mutakallim.
- Ahmad ibn Muhammad al-Tha'labi – was an 11th-century Islamic scholar.
- Abd al-Karīm ibn Hawāzin Qushayri – was born in 986 CE (376 AH), Philosopher and Sufi
- Omar Khayyám – (18 May 1048 – 4 December 1131) was a Persian polymath, philosopher, mathematician, astronomer and poet.
- Abd al-Ghafir al-Farsi – (1059–1135), Persian scholar of Arabic, history and hadith
- Mu'izzi – was an 11th and 12th-centuries poet
- Haji Bektash Veli – was a Muslim mystic
- Attar of Nishapur – (c. 1145 – c. 1221), was a Muslim poet, theoretician of Sufism, and hagiographer.
- Abu al-Qasim al-Habib Neishapuri – physician mid-15th century.
- Saadat Ali Khan I – (b. c. 1680 – d. 19 March 1739) was the Subahdar Nawab of Oudh. All the rulers of Oudh State in India belonged to a Shia Muslim dynasty of Persian origin from Nishapur. They were known for their secularism and broad outlook. After they rebelled against the British their state was annexed to form the United Provinces of Agra and Oudh.
- Hamid Hussain Musavi – (born 1830 – died 1880) was a leading Shia scholar
- Heydar Yaghma – poet and literary editor
- Badi' –
- Abolghasem Sakhdari – wrestler
- Saeed Khani – footballer
- Yaghoub Ali Shourvarzi – wrestler
- Nur-Ali Shushtari – (c. 1948 – d. 18 October 2009) was a brigadier general
- Esmail Shooshtari –
- Parviz Meshkatian –
- Mohammad-Reza Shafiei Kadkani – (born 1939) is a Persian writer, poet, literary critic, editor, and translator.
- Hossein Vahid Khorasani‍—‌(born January 1, 1921) is an Iranian Twelver Shia Marja
- Abdolreza Kahani‍—‌ Director
- Hamed Behdad‍—‌(1973–) Actor
- Sara Didar - footballer
- Ali Nemati - footballer

== Culture ==
=== Mythology and religion ===
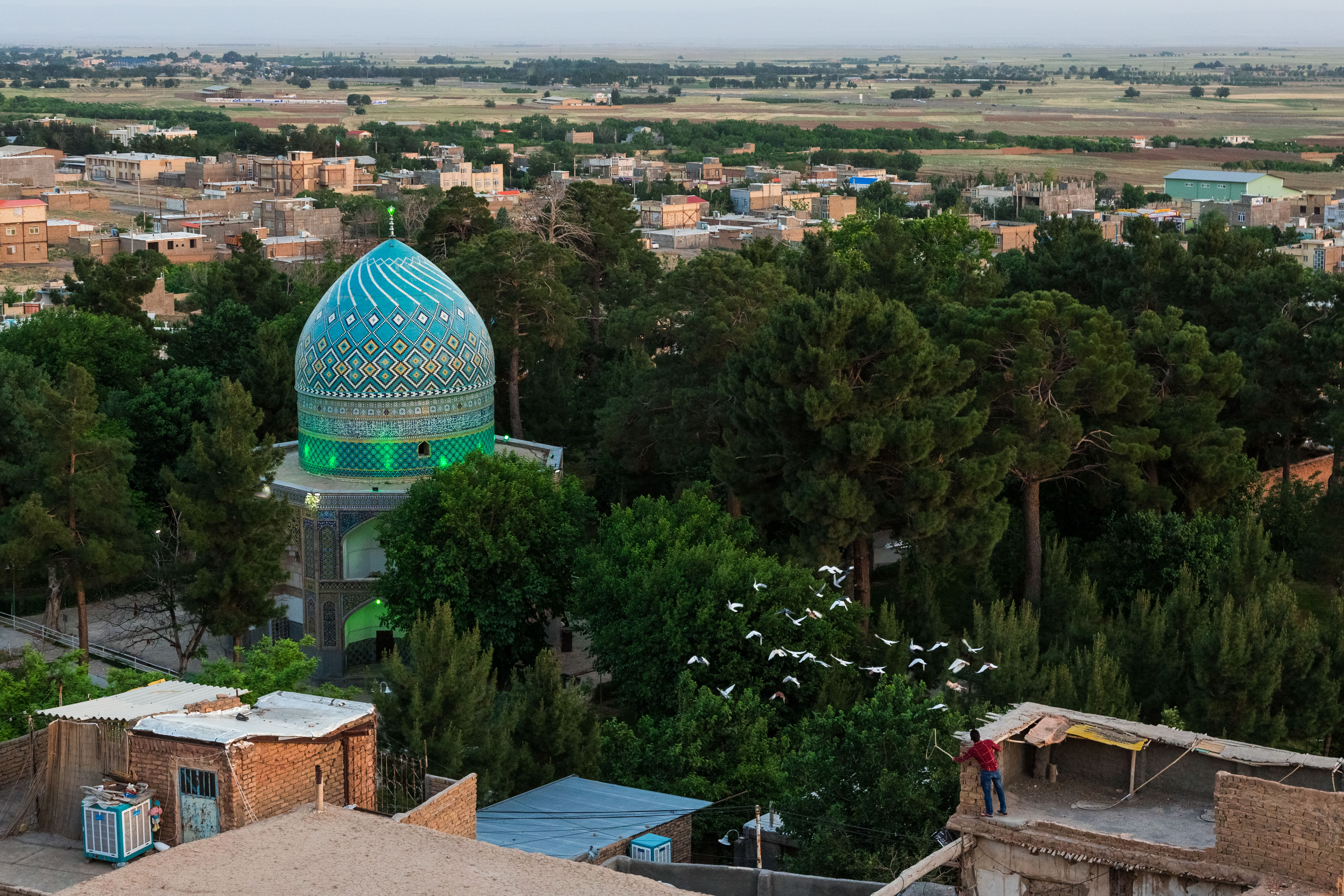
Qadamgah, a city and a Shia pilgrimage. It is historically part of the Greater Region of the city of Nishapur. It is now legally a separate county (Shahrestan), though its people have close ties and relatives with the main bigger city of Nishapur, which is geographically close to it. Qadamgah used to be a part of the administrative county of Nishapur.

Nishapur has been of importance in Iranian mythology. Before the Islamization of Iran, Zoroastrianism had been the major religion of Nishapur. Rivand (one of the ancient names of Nishapur) has been mentioned in Avesta and subsequently in Shahnameh. Adur Burzen-Mihr a Zoroastrian fire temple of the highest grade was situated in Rivand Mountains (Binalud mountains) of Nishapur and the lake Rivand of Nishapur was built due to a fight between Ahriman and water (probably by water it was meant Anahita in the Persian text of the Persian wiki). Also, according to Hakim Nishapuri, Dež-e Sɑngi was built by Seth on a giant round soft (flat) stone There are also signs of the influence of Christianity in Nishapur (a street in Nishapur has been called and is still called Masih and also a village on the south of the city was called Masih Abad). After the rise of Islam however, the people living in and near the city of Neyshabur became Muslims. Nishapur and its people have also had an influence on Sufism (an Islamic mystic practice). Poets and Sufis such as Attar of Nishapur who had been born in this city had had a profound influence on Islamic mysticism. In the 10th century, Nishapur had been one of the centers of Ismaili missionary spread in Iran and Greater Khorasan. Most of the Ismailis of Nishapur now live in Dizbad and some in the main city itself. Jama'at Khana Dizbad is the most important Ismaili center in Nishapur today. From the third to the sixth of Hejri Ghamari, Nishapur was one of the centers of Sufism. Most Sufis and Sufi elders in Nishapur were Sunnis and followers of the Shafi'i school.

During the 10th century, Nishapur was a thriving economic center home to many religious scholars and artists. Nishapur was located along the Silk Road. An influential trade route connecting China to the Mediterranean Sea. It was a center for cotton, silk, textile and ceramic production. In efforts to uncover the history of life in this city, the Metropolitan Museum of Art put together an excavation team composed of researchers Joseph Upton, Walter Hauser and Charles Wilkinson. From 1935 to 1940, the team worked to rediscover the ancient city. They were authorized to work under the conditions that half of the material found must be shared with the Iran Bastan Museum in Tehran. Along with pottery, excavators uncovered glass, metalwork, coins. and decorated wall fragments. Over the years of excavations, thousands of items were uncovered, which provided information on local artistic traditions.

=== Tepe Madraseh ===
The most elaborate architectural excavation took place at the site called Tepe Madraseh. This massive complex had been thoughtfully planned and embellished with many decorative elements. Plaster panels had been carved and painted, along with walls, brickwork, and glazed ceramic tiles. A madraseh is a place for religious learning. Such sites have piqued the interest of scholars for centuries for their function and architectural designs. Like most Islamic architecture, the entire complex of Tepe Madaseh was oriented to face Mecca. The bricks used to construct most of the structures had been dried in the kilns located on the outskirts of the complex.

=== Pottery ===
Nishapur during the Islamic Golden Age, especially the 9th and 10th centuries, was one of the great centers of pottery and related arts. Most of the Ceramic artifacts discovered in Nishapur are preserved in the Metropolitan Museum of Art and Museums in Nishapur, Tehran and Mashhad. Ceramics produced at Nishapur showed links with Sasanian art and Central Asian. Nowadays there are 4 Pottery workshops in Nishapur.

Bowls including bold black inscriptions in the so-called Kufic angular calligraphy were apparently produced in the important ceramic centers of Nishapur in eastern Iran, and Afrasiyab, or Old Samarqand, in present-day Uzbekistan. The text often contains a proverb in Arabic or, as in this case, a series of wishes: "Blessing, happiness, prosperity, good health, and success."

=== Form and function of Nishapur pottery ===
"Although the decoration of pottery may only tell us a little about the people who used it, the form of a vessel is directly related to its function". The Pottery of Nishapur incorporated strong colored slips and bold patterns. Common decorations included geometric and vegetal patterns, calligraphy, figures, and animals. The ceramic pieces uncovered at Nishapur consisted mainly of vessels and utilitarian wares. Objects such as plates, bowls, bottles, jars, pitchers, coin banks, and even a toy hen were found. One decorative technique specifically utilized by Nishapur potters was the refined use of chattering, a rippled texture achieved when trimming a vessel on the wheel. The polychrome ware of Nishapur indicates the significant advances in glaze technology that were being discovered during the 10th century. It also indicates how an object's aesthetic became an important part of the piece as a whole.

A selection of these discoveries is shown in the gallery below:

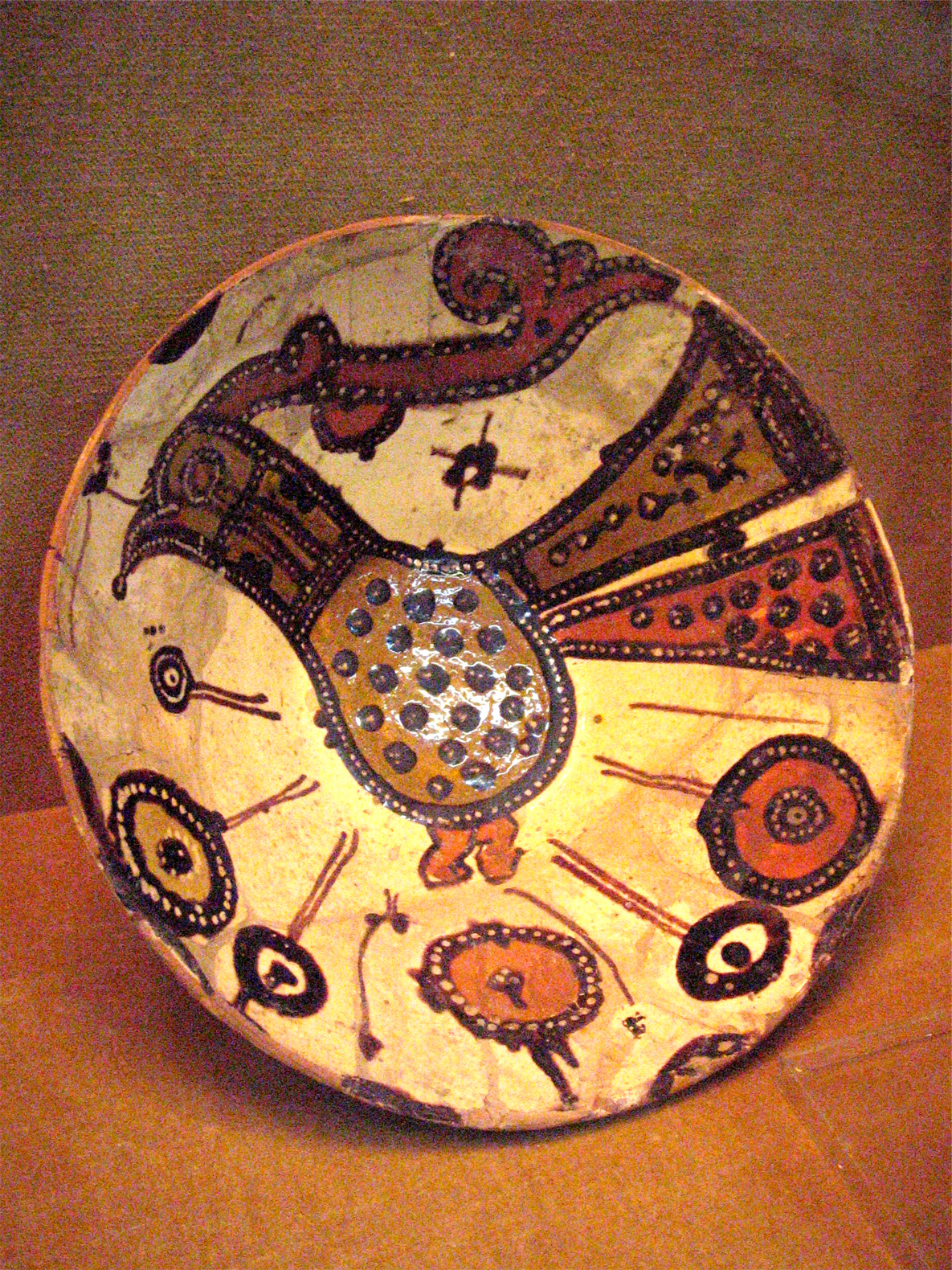
Bowl painted on slip under transparent glaze (polychrome), Nishabur, 9th or 10th century. National Museum of Iran, Tehran.

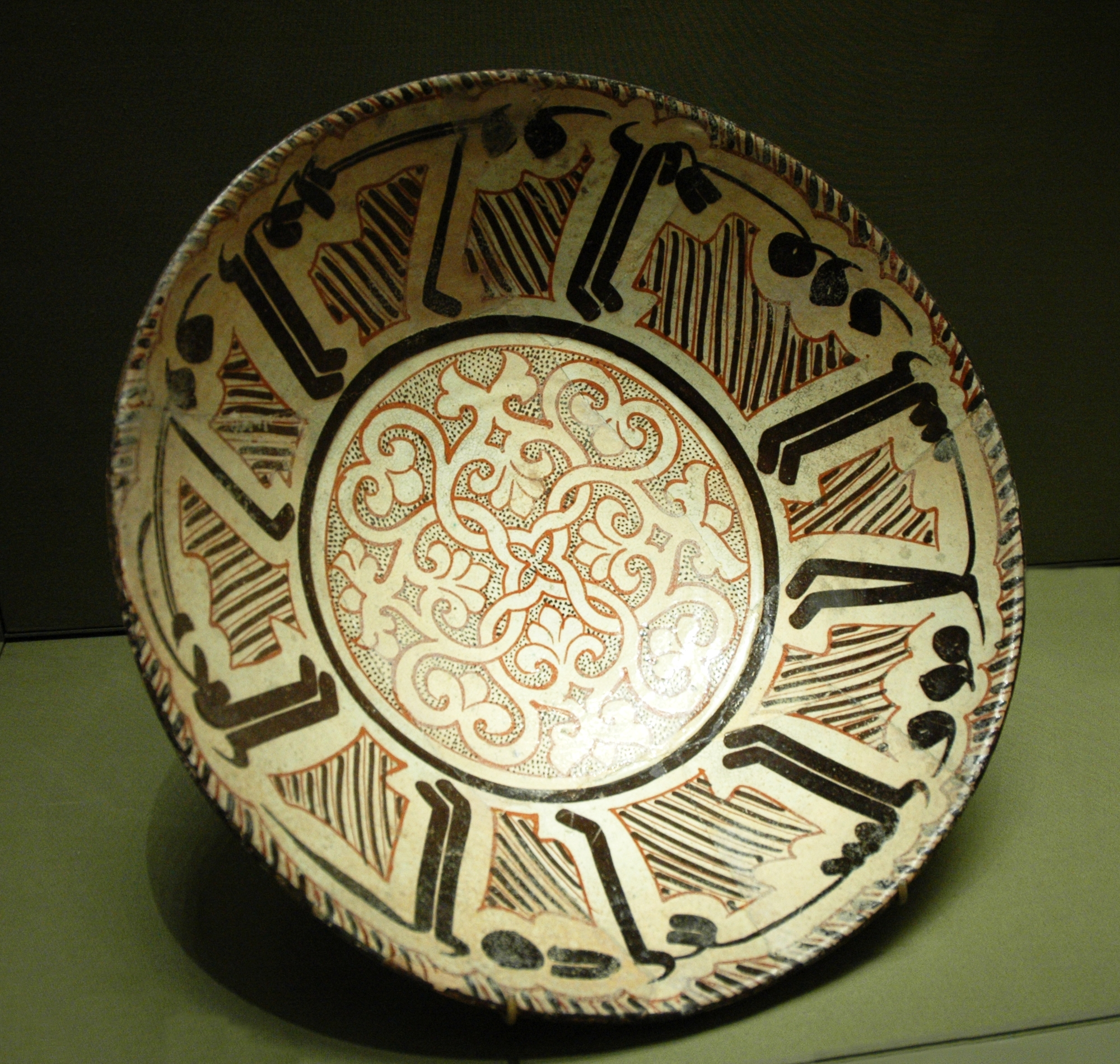
Bowl with Kufic Inscriptions found in the archeological excavations of Nishapur. The Middle East Institute's logo has been inspired by this bowl. This bowl is currently held in the Met.

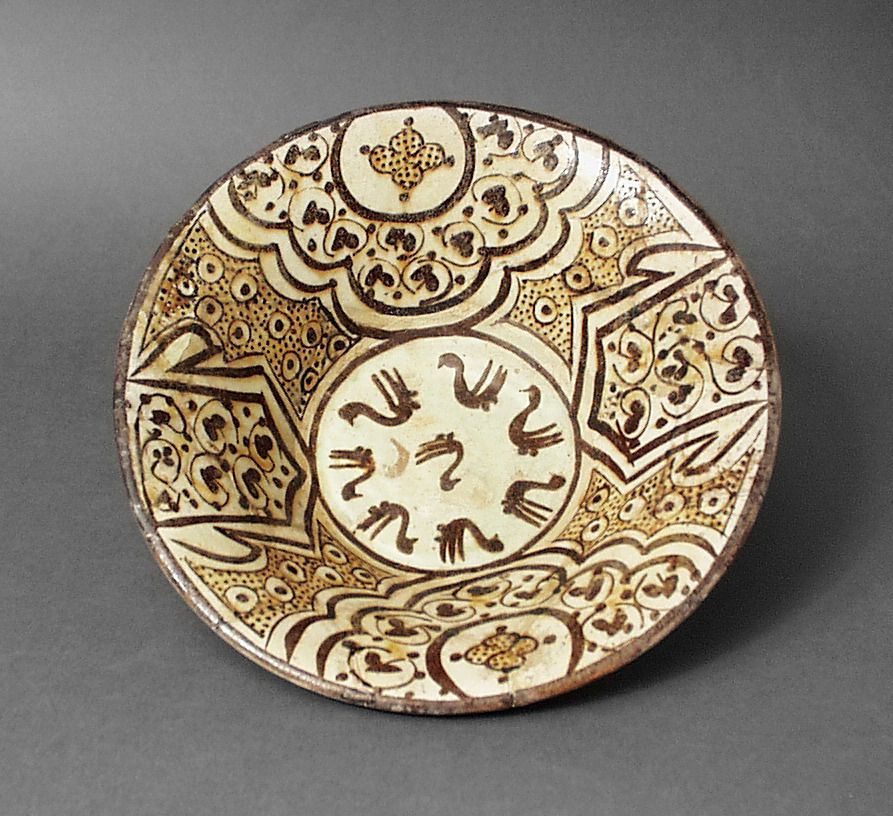
Pottery of Nishapur in the Islamic Golden Age (10th - 11th century)

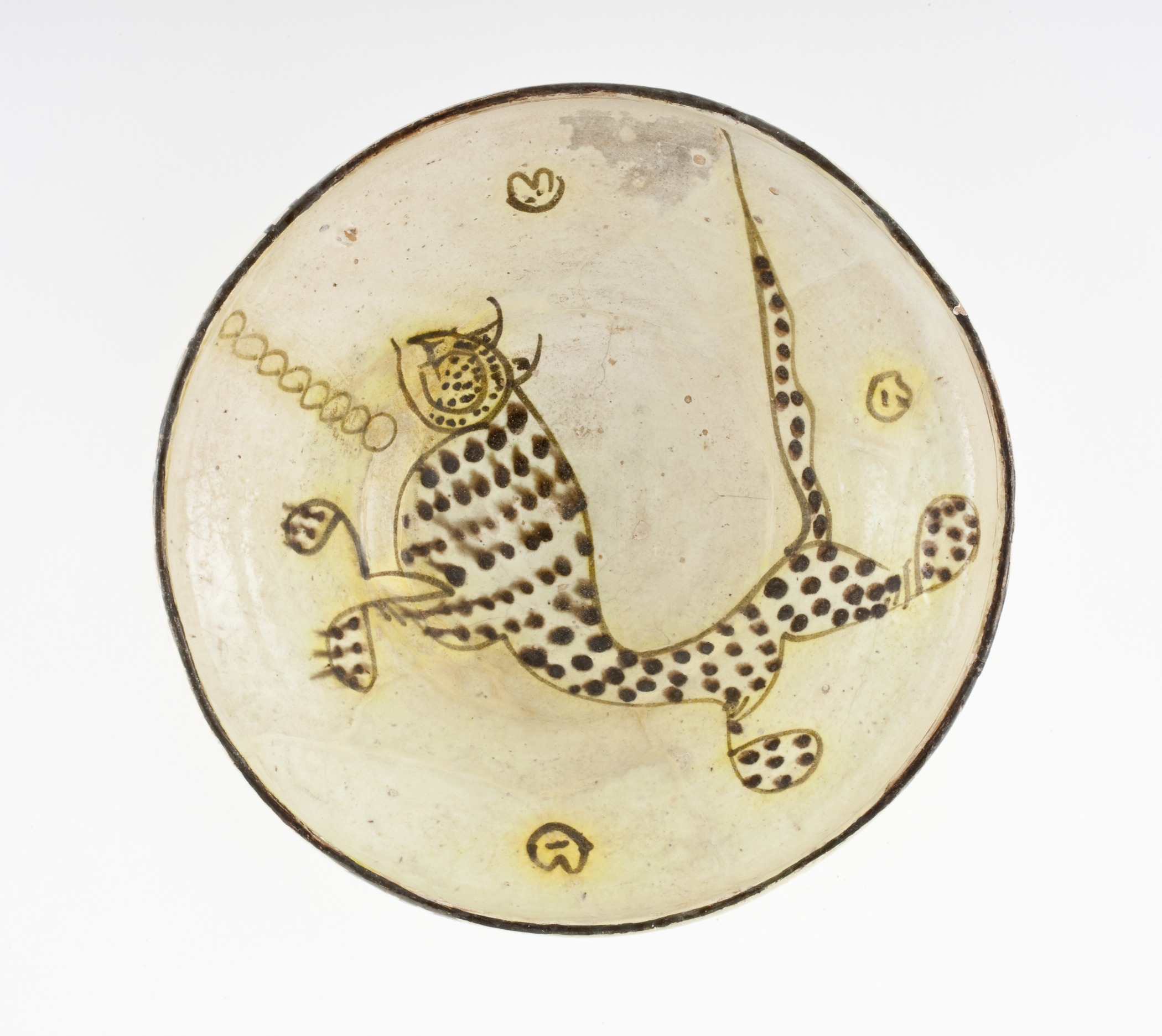
Pottery of Nishapur in the Islamic Golden Age (10th - 11th century)

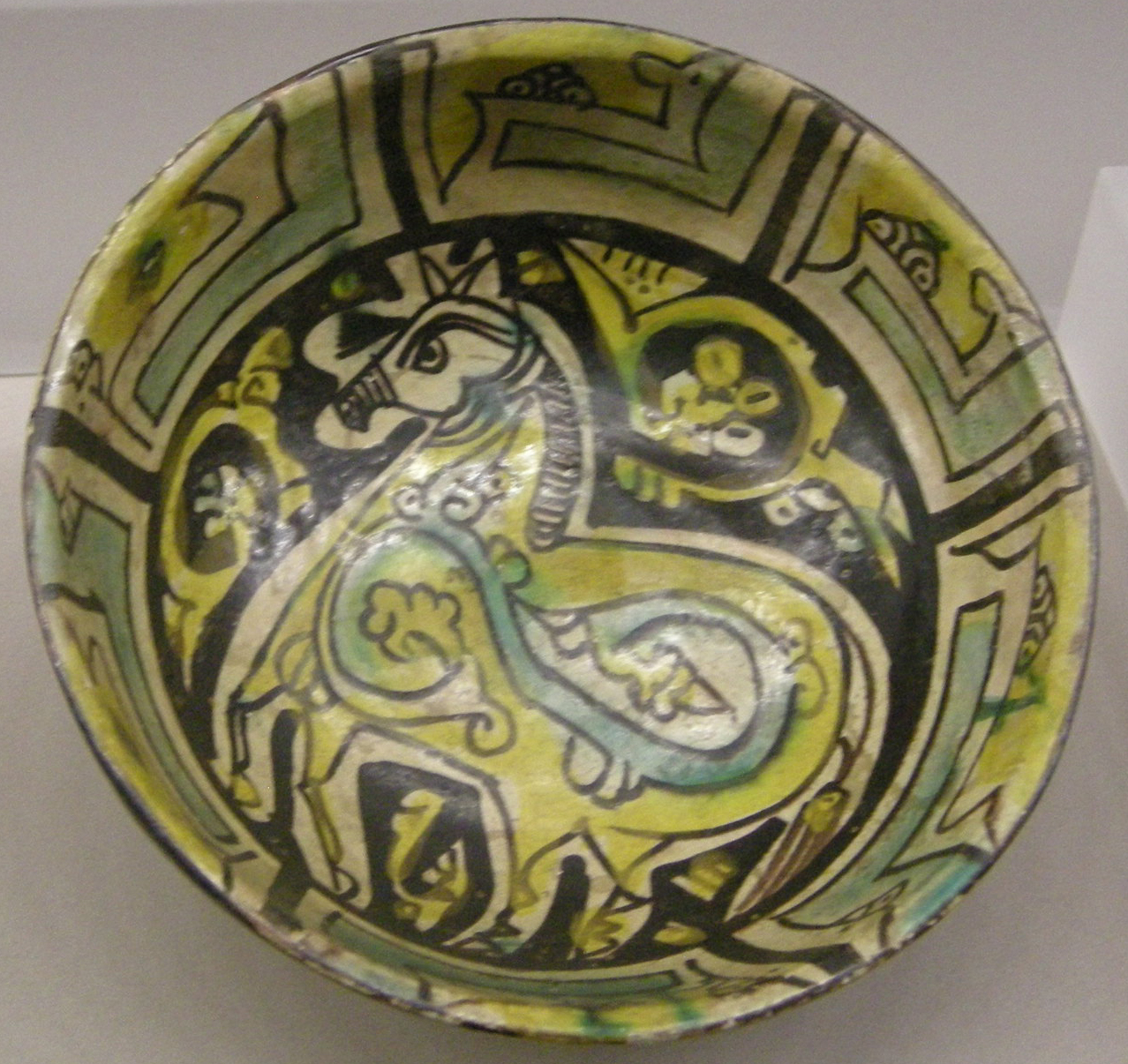
Pottery of Nishapur in the Islamic Golden Age (10th - 11th century)

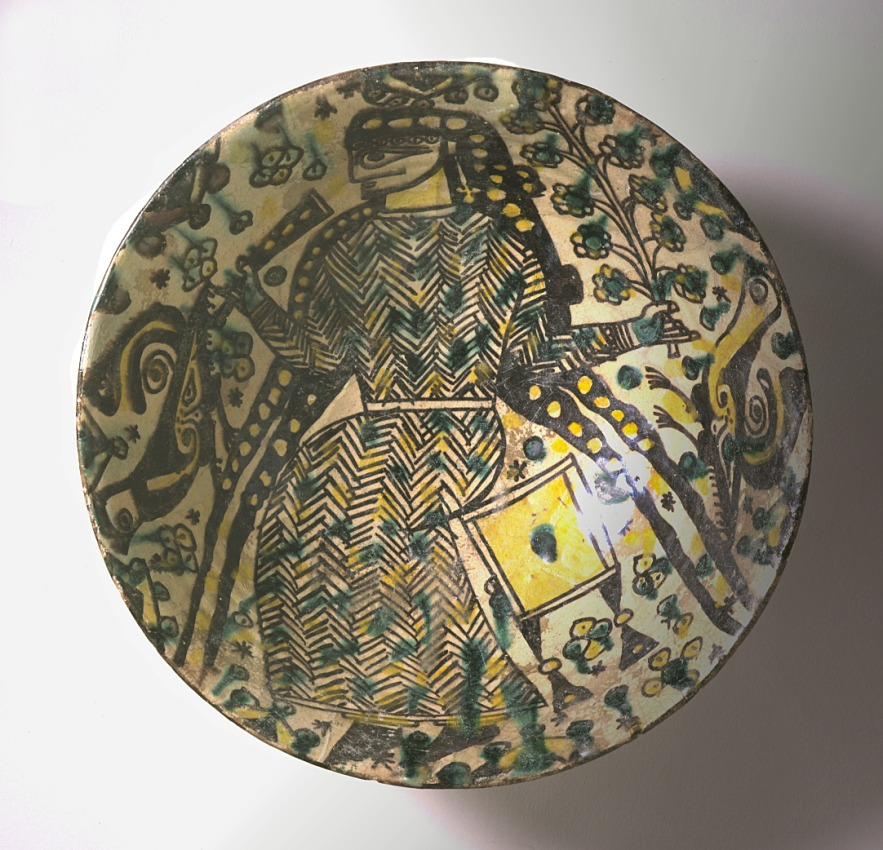
Pottery of Nishapur in the Islamic Golden Age (10th - 11th century)

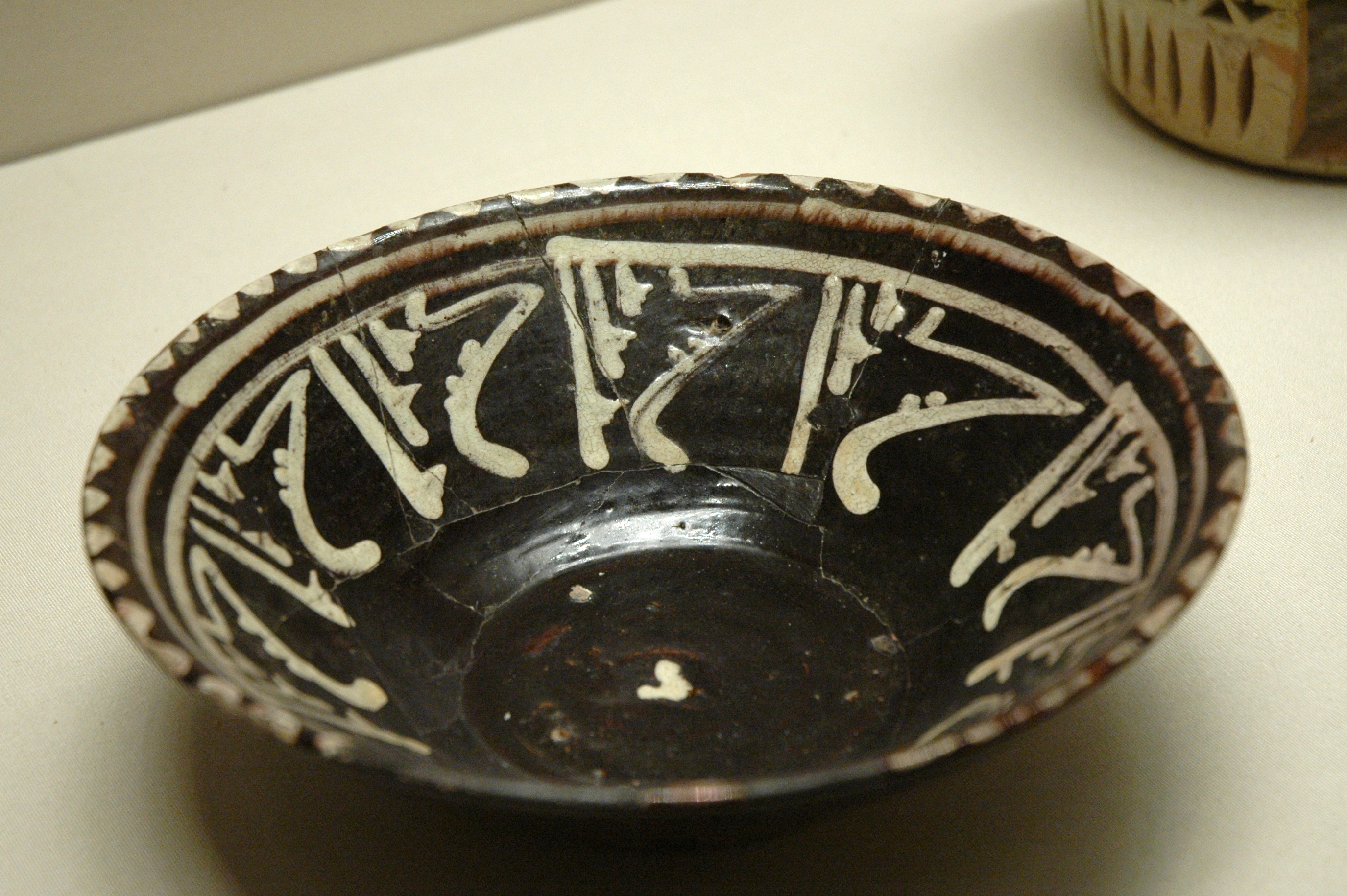
Cup with votive inscriptions in Kufic script. Terracotta, slipped decoration on slip, underglaze painted. 10th-11th century, Nishapur. Metropolitan Museum of Art

=== Anthem of Nishapur ===
The special Anthem of Nishapur was unveiled for the first time on April 14, 2011; it has an introduction and three parts, noted on three invasive and destructive events in the history of Nishapur, delineated by frightening sounds of bells, along with sounds of percussion and wailing women represent the miseries caused by these attacks.

Persian original	Romanization	English translation
ای پایتخت اول ایرانی من ای آسمانت فرصتِ بارانی من «فیروزه» ات نقش نگین مهربانی اندیشه های مردمانت آسمانی روییده در هر گوشه ات گل‌های احساس خرداد «بینالود» تو سرشار «ریواس» شرمنده از کردار خود «تاتار» و «چنگیز» پاینده باشی ای «ابرشهر» هنرخیز در کوچه باغت مانده رد پایی از ماه گل کرده در چشمان تو نام «قدمگاه»	Ey pâyetaxt-e aval-e irâni-ye man Ey asemânat forsat-e bârâni-ye man Firuzeh at naqš-e negin-e mehrabâni Andiše-hâ-ye mardomânat asemâni Ruyiyedeh dar har guše at gol-hâ-ye ehsâs Xordâd-e binâlud-e to saršâr-e rivâs Šarmande az kerdâr-e xod tâtâr o Čangiz Pâyandeh bâshi ey baršahr-e honar xiz Dar kuče bâqat mânde rad-e pâyi az mâh Gol kardeh dar češmân-e to nâmeh Qadamgâh	O my Iranian first capital O your sky my rainy time your Turquoise, pattern of kindness ring Your People's thoughts Heavenly Sprouting in your every corner flowers of love Khordad of your Binalud full of rhubarb, Tartar and Genghis ashamed of their actions May you stand proud, you Art fertile land The moon left footsteps in your gardens Qadamgah's name has bloomed in your eyes

=== Literature ===
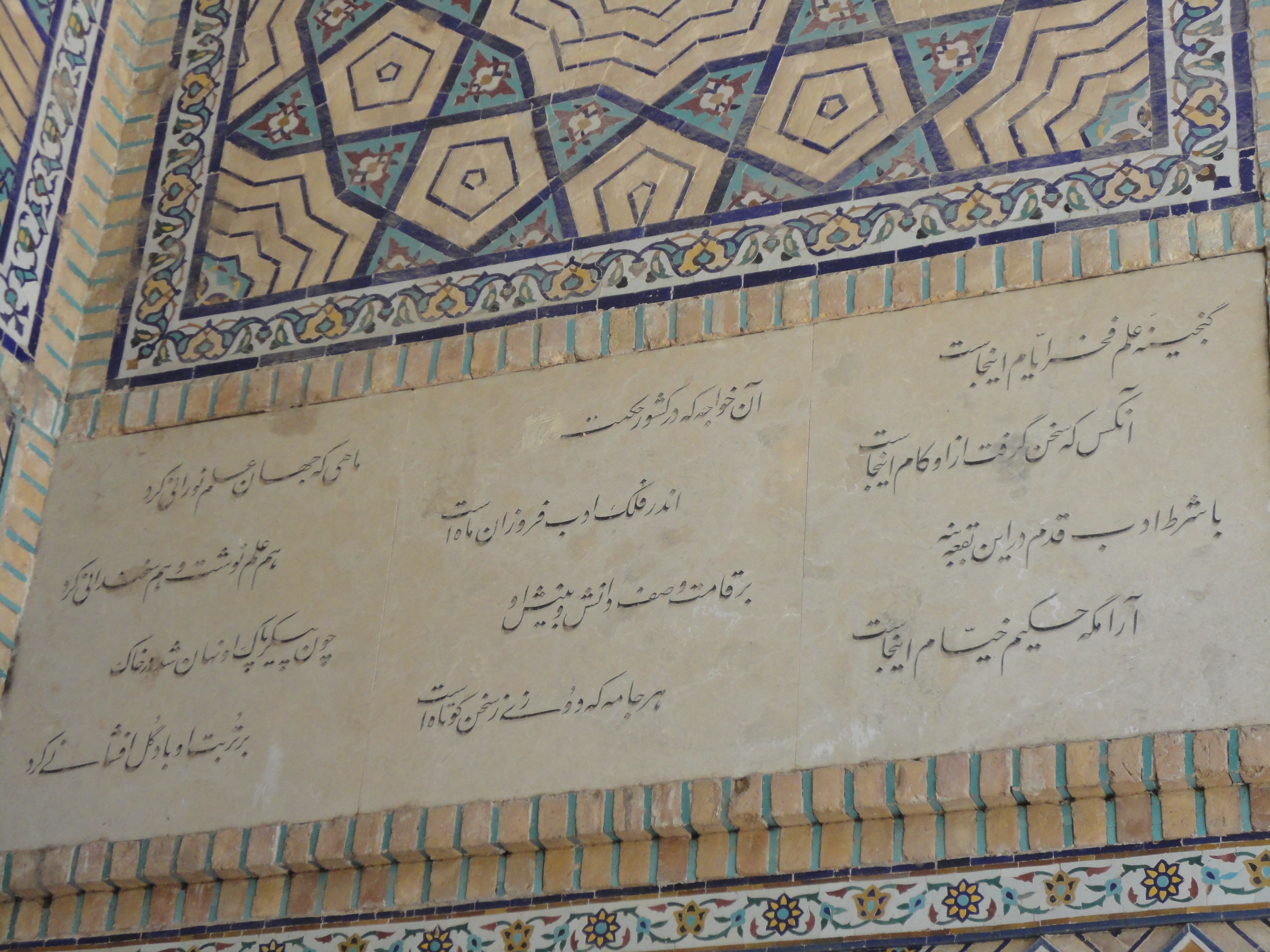
A poem in Persian written in Nasaliq script. This poem is written for/about the tomb of Omar Khayyam in Nishapur.

Throughout history, Nishapur has been mentioned and praised in Persian literature several times, mostly due to its prosperity and gardens. This city has been the birthplace and home of many famous Persian poets, including Omar Khayyam, Attar of Nishapur, Heydar Yaghma, Shafiei Kadkani, and others. Foreign writers such as André Gide (in The Fruits of the Earth) and Jorge Luis Borges have also mentioned this city in their work(s).

=== Music ===
Throughout history, music in Nishapur has been influenced by Sasanian, Maqami and traditional styles and is a part of the Khorasani Folk Music that has been popular in Nishapur. Following the UNESCO World Register of Maqami Music in Northern Khorasan, research on music in Nishapur has been considered. Maghami music festivals have been also active in Nishapur. One of the oldest study sources related to Iranian music is Resal-e Neyshaburi (in Persian:رساله نیشابور) written by Mohammad bin Mahmoud of Nishapur, which highlights the importance of music in old Nishapur. Among the influential people of Nishapur in music Ratebe Neyshaburi (during the reign of Tahirids), and the contemporary Parviz Meshkatian can be named.

==== Other influences ====
- Yo-Yo Ma released an instrumental track entitled "Blue as the Turquoise Night of Neyshabur" as part of the Silk Road Project.
- US band Santana released an instrumental track entitled "Incident at Neshabur" on their 1970 LP release, Abraxas. Carlos Santana says this was a reference to a place in Haiti.

=== Sports ===
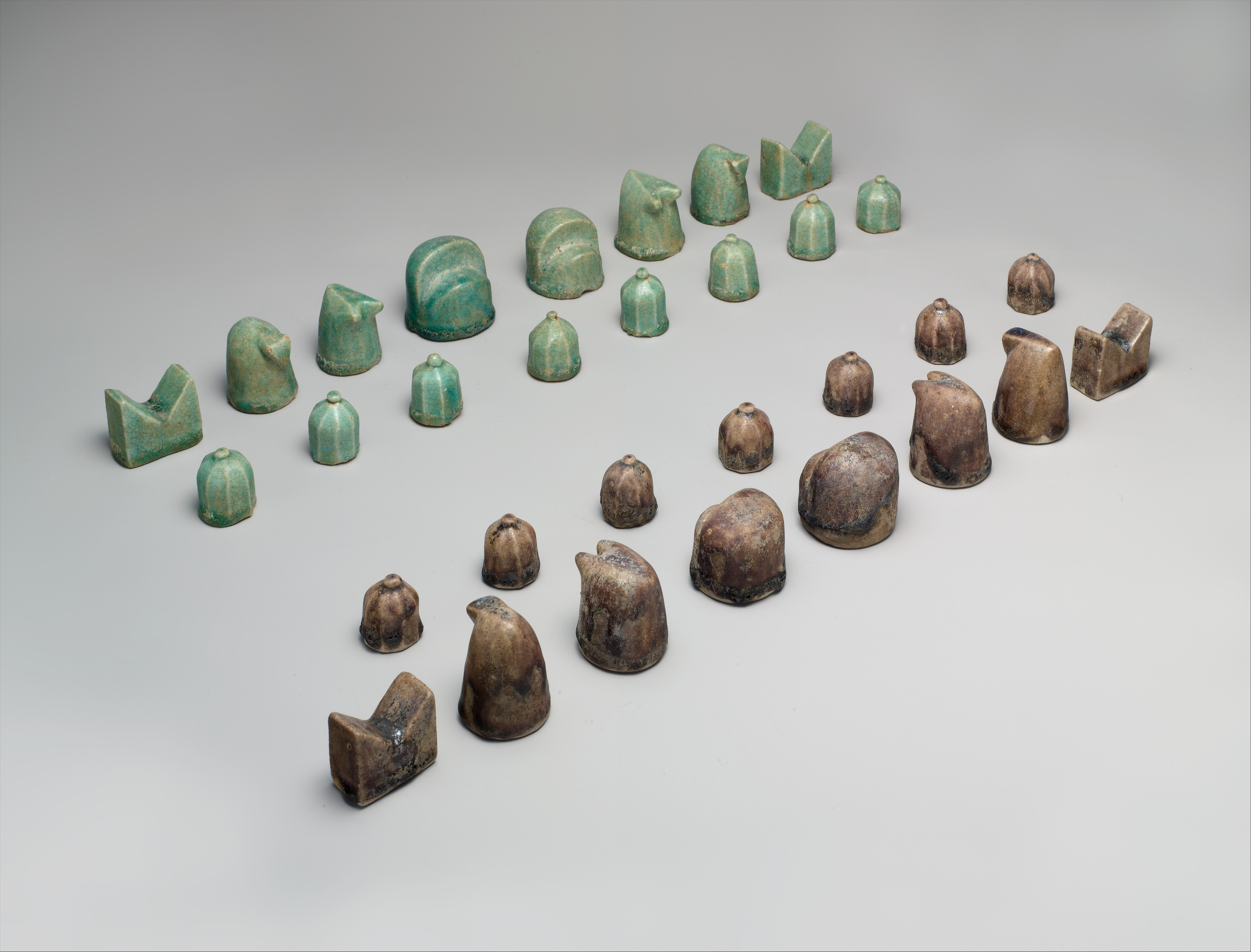
Chess set (Shatrang); Gaming pieces. 12th century, Nishapur glazed fritware

The 15th World Scout Jamboree was scheduled to be held 15–23 July 1979 and was to be hosted by Pahlavi Iran at Nishapur, but was cancelled due to the Iranian Revolution in 1979.

=== Video games ===
- Nishapur is included as a playable setting in a historical video game series called ''Crusader Kings''.
- Nishapur is included as a playable setting in a historical video game called ''Historinica''.

=== Paintings ===
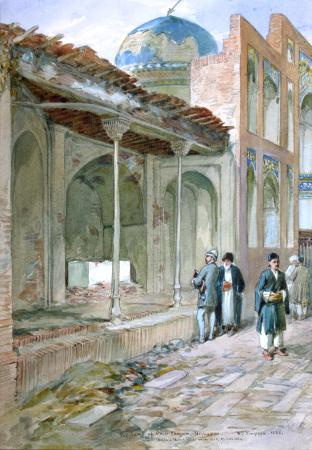
William Simpson's painting of the Khayyam Tomb & Imamzadeh Mahrugh in the 19th century (Nishapur).

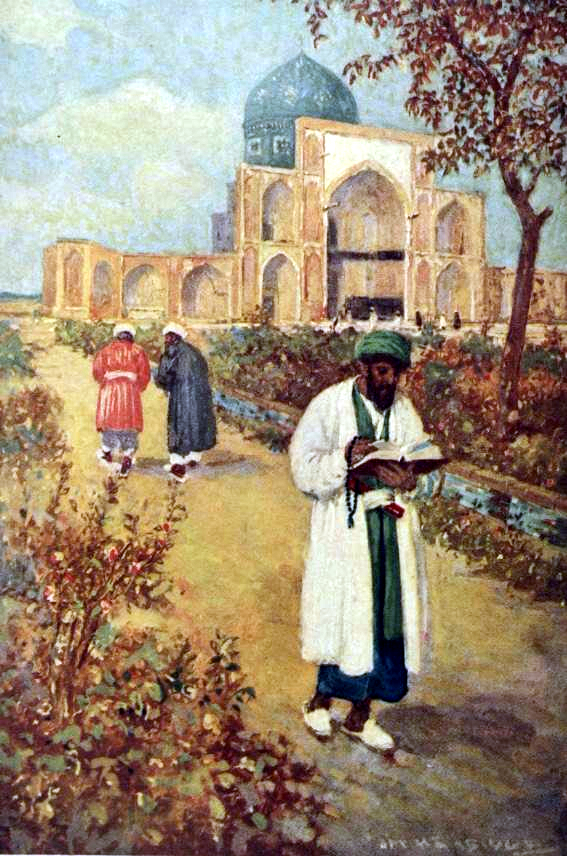
Jay Hambidge's Painting of Khayyam Tomb & Imamzadeh Mahrugh (Nishapur).

=== Local and cultural days ===
Name	Day	Calendar
Farvardin 1	Nowruz	Solar Hijri
Farvardin 13	Sizdah Be-dar, Day of Nature	Solar Hijri
Farvardin 25	Respect day for Attar of Nishapur	Solar Hijri
Ordibehesht 28	Respect day for Omar Khayyam	Solar Hijri
Tir 10	Remembrance day for Imam Ali al-Ridha	Solar Hijri
Mordad 2	Sympathy day for the victims of Boozhan flood	Solar Hijri
Azar 30	Night of Yalda	Solar Hijri
Bahman 29	Sympathy day the victims of Nishapur train disaster	Solar Hijri
Last Wednesday of Esfand	Chaharshanbe Suri Festival	Solar Hijri
Esfand 29	Celebrate the end of winter	Solar Hijri
Muharram 10	Remembrance of Muharram	Lunar Hijri
Safar 20	Arba'een	Lunar Hijri
Rabi' al-awwal 17	Mawlid	Lunar Hijri
Rajab 25	Respect day for Muslim ibn al-Hajjaj, death of Musa al-Kadhim	Lunar Hijri
Sha'aban 14	Borat Nights (3 nights)	Lunar Hijri
Shawwal 1	Eid al-Fitr	Lunar Hijri
Dhu al-Hijjah 18	Eid of Ghadir, Day of Visiting Sadaat	Lunar Hijri

=== Gastronomy and food culture ===
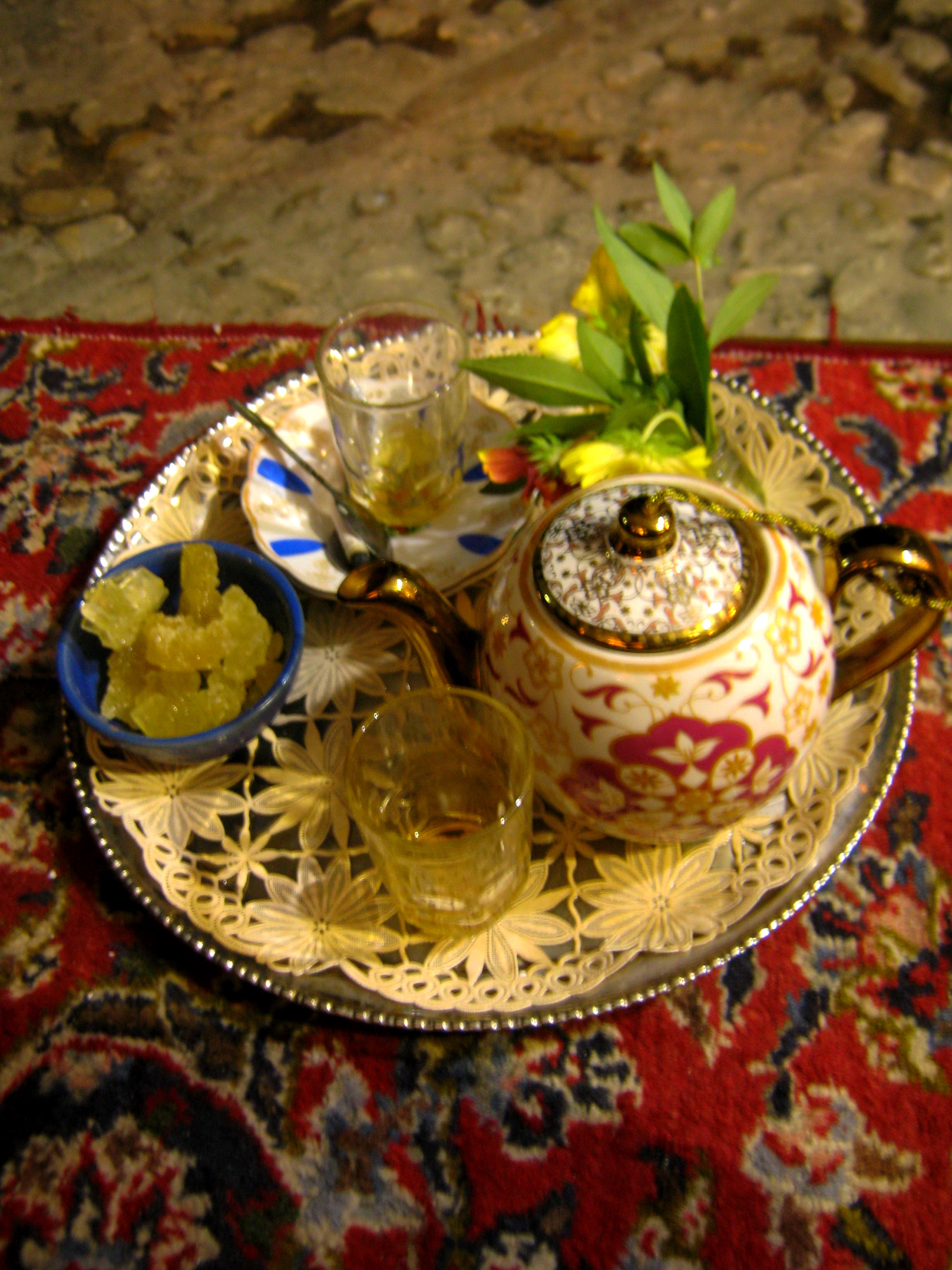
A tea tray served near the Garden of Mausoleum of Omar Khayyam

The most important foods and drinks in Nishapur are rhubarb and sharbat. Rhubarb (Persian rivaas or rivand'), a sour vegetable, grows at the foot of the eponymous Rivand Mountains (Mount Binalud). Soft drinks made from the stems of the plant, such as sharbate rivaas (شربت ریواس) and khoshaabe rivaas (خوشاب ریواس), are sold at some Nishapur resorts. ''Aush Komay'' is also a local Aush made from a vegetable called ''کمای''. Haleem of Neyshabur is also popular in the region along with other common Iranian foods and drinks.

=== Carpet-weaving ===
Weaving carpets and rugs common in the more than 470 villages in Nishapur County, the most important carpet Workshop located in the villages of: Shafi' Abad, Garineh, Darrud, Baghshan, Kharv, Bozghan, Sayyed Abad, Sar Chah, Suleymani, Sultan Abad and Eshgh Abad. Nishapur Carpet workshops weaved the biggest Carpets in the world, like carpets of: Sheikh Zayed Grand Mosque, Sultan Qaboos Grand Mosque, Armenian Presidential Palace, Embassy of Finland in Tehran, Mohammed Al-Ameen Mosque in Oman.

Modern art of carpet in Nishapur began in 1946 after inauguration of a carpet-weaving workshop in a caravansary.

=== Turquoise masonry ===
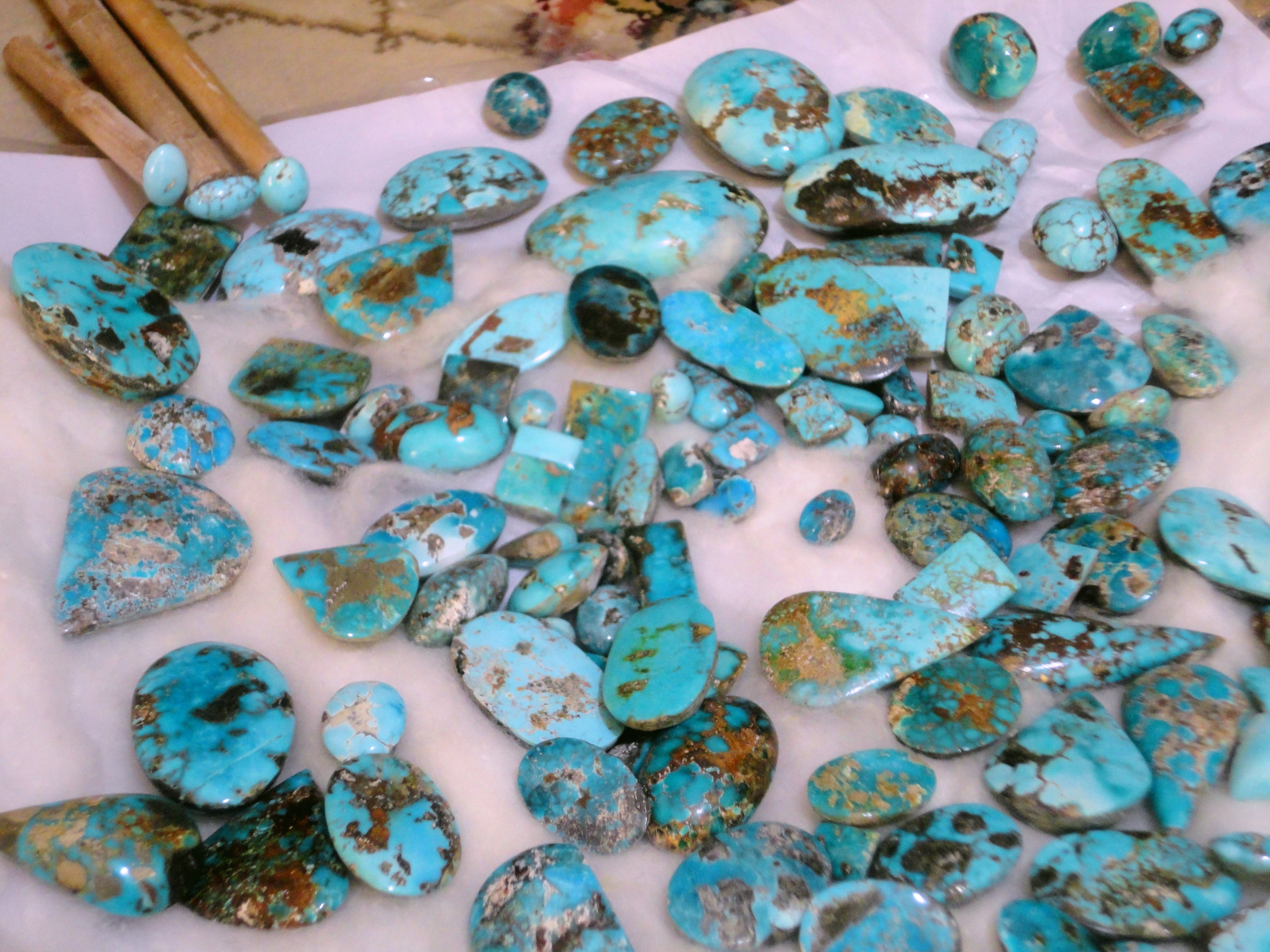
Turquoise of Nishapur (Madan-e Olya of Nishapur)

For at least 2,000 years, Iran, known before as Persia, has remained an important source of turquoise, which was named by Iranians initially "pirouzeh" meaning "victory" and later after Arab invasion "firouzeh". As an important source of turquoise, Nishapur has been sometimes referred to as the "city of turquoise" throughout history. In Iranian architecture, the blue turquoise was used to cover the domes of the Iranian palaces because its intense blue color was also a symbol of heaven on earth.

This deposit, which is blue naturally, and turns green when heated due to dehydration, is restricted to a mine-riddled region in Nishapur, the 2,012-metre (6,601 ft) mountain peak of Ali-mersai, which is tens of kilometers from Mashhad, the capital of Khorasan province, Iran. Nishapur's turquoise has been sold as souvenirs and jewelry in Nishapur and Mashhad. A weathered and broken trachyte is host to the turquoise, which is found both in situ between layers of limonite and sandstone, and amongst the scree at the mountain's base. These workings, together with those of the Sinai Peninsula, are the oldest known.

=== Architecture and monuments ===
A selection of historical buildings and monuments of the city is shown in the city info box on the top of this article, and on the gallery below:

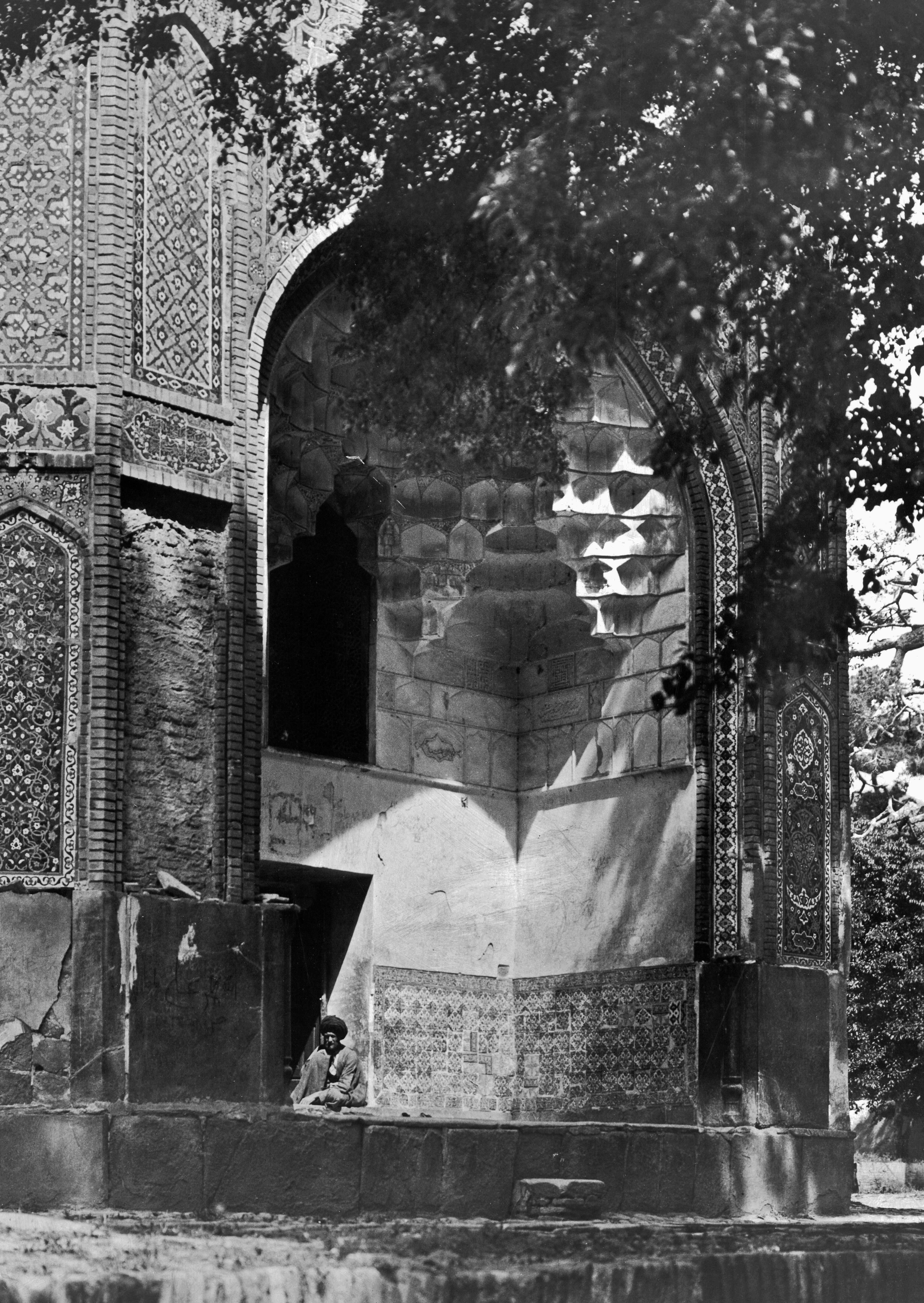
Qadamgah Shia pilgrimage of Nishapur, Probably in 1960s or 50s

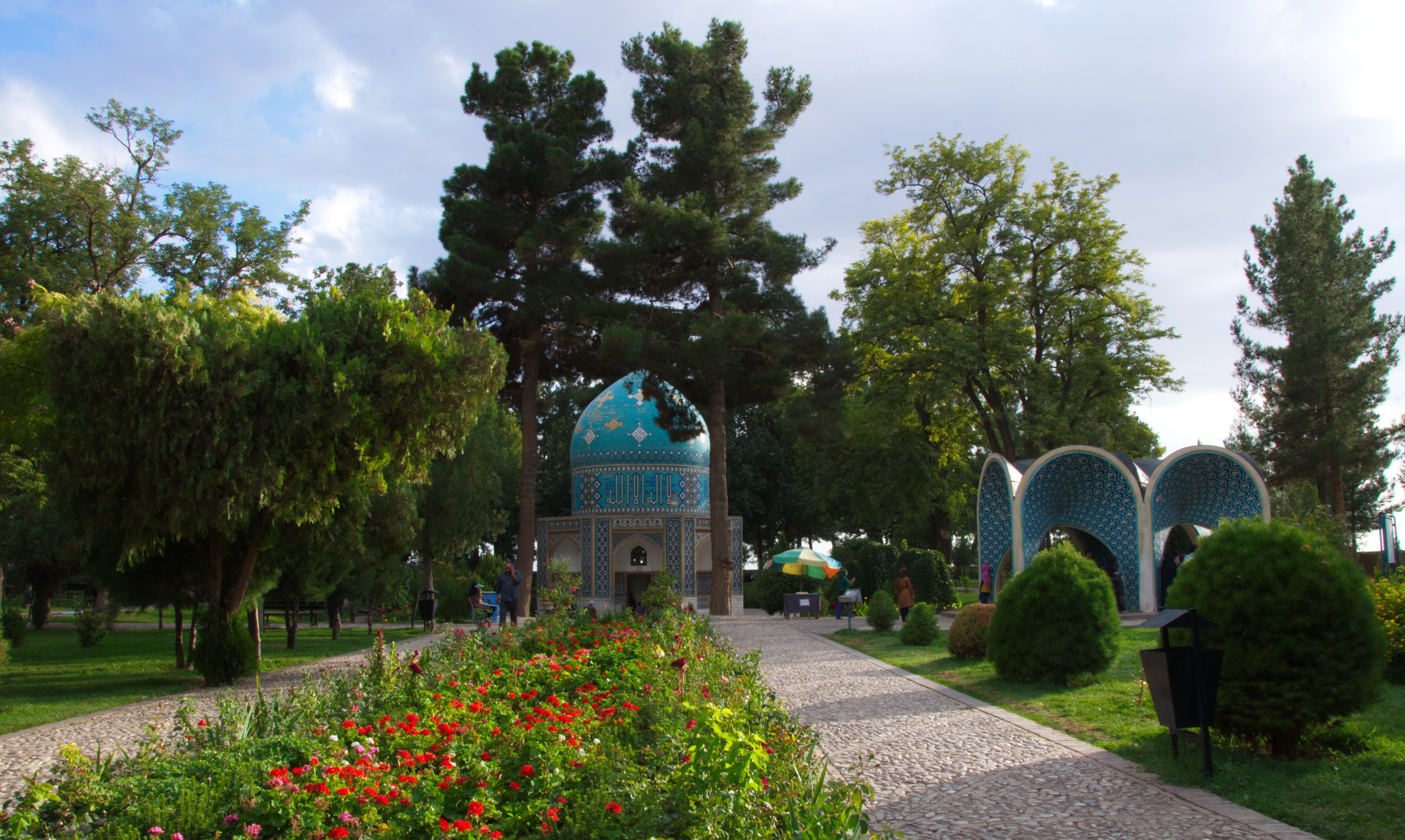
Tomb of Attar & Kamal ol Molk. Part of the national heritage list of Iran.

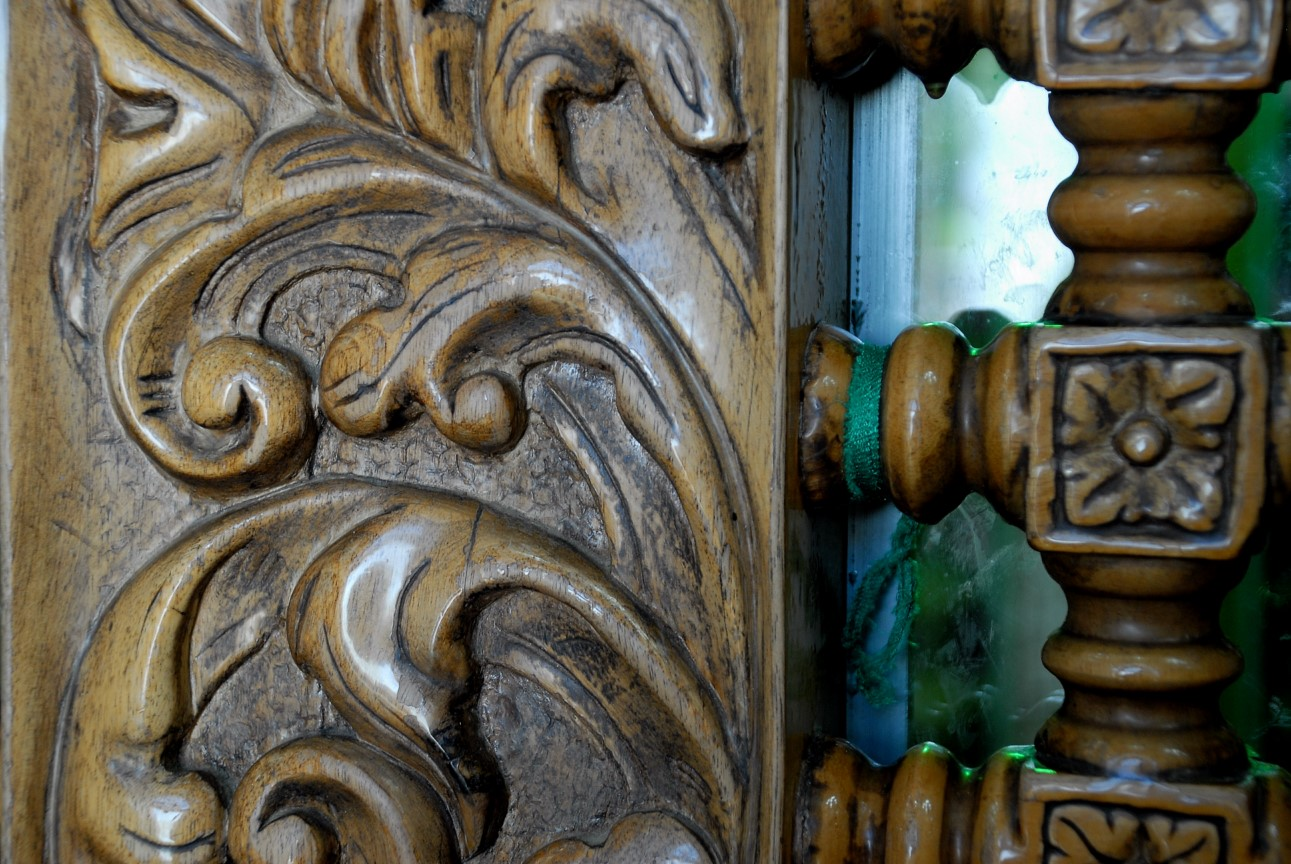
Fadhl Ibn Shazan tomb & mosque interior. Part of the national heritage list of Iran.

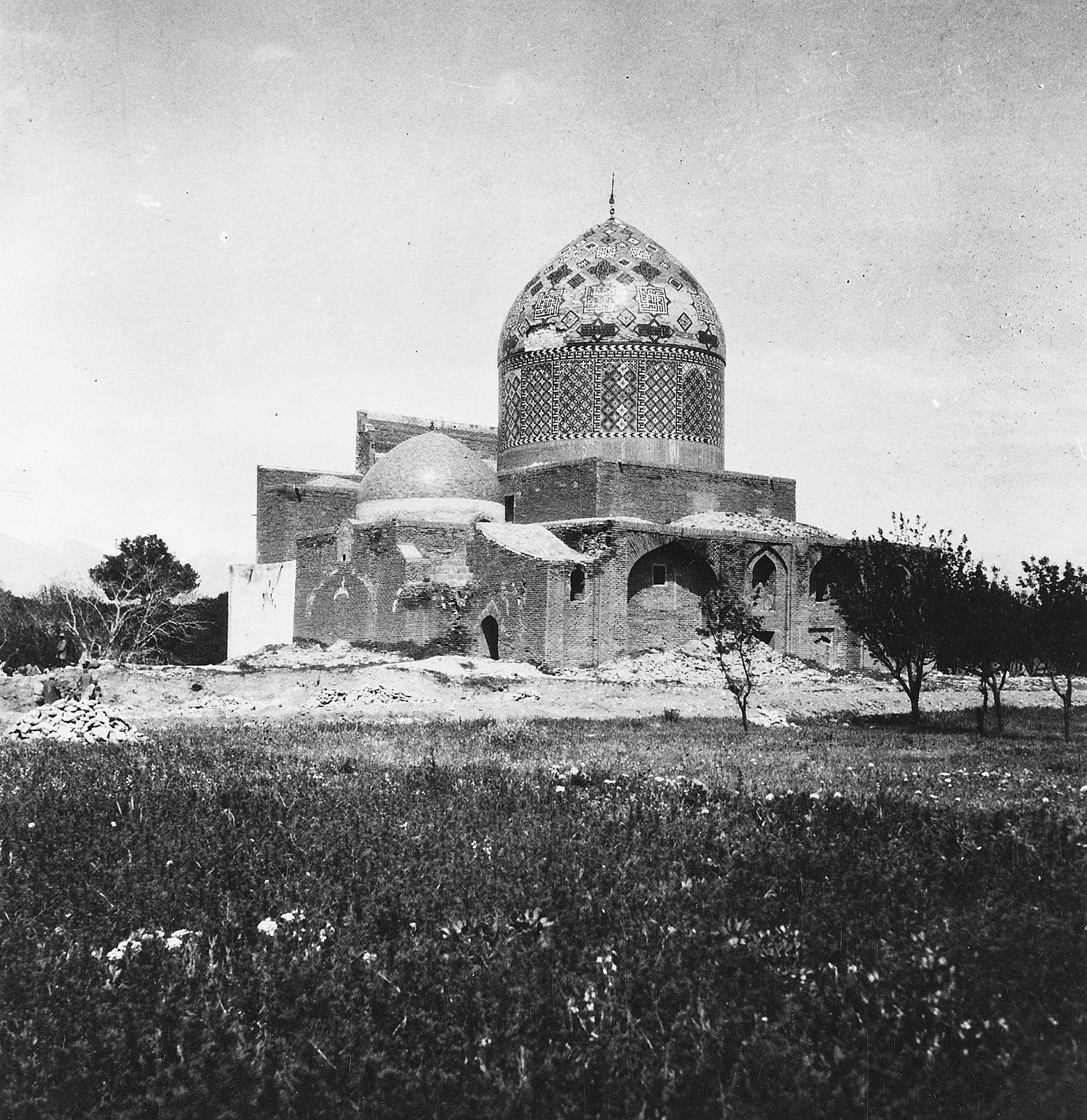
Imamzadeh Mahruq before 1900.

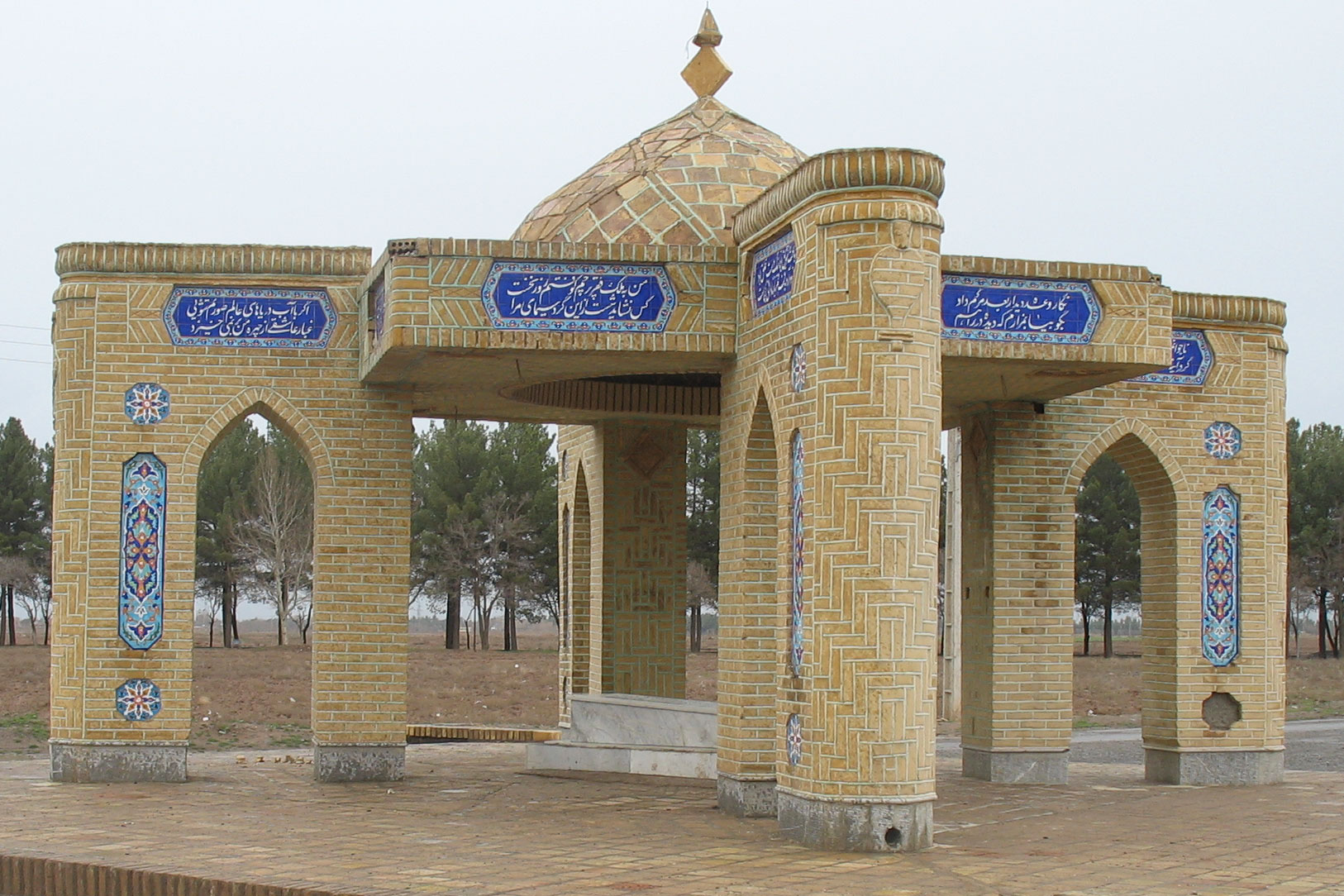
Tomb of Heydar Yaghma. Part of the national heritage list of Iran.

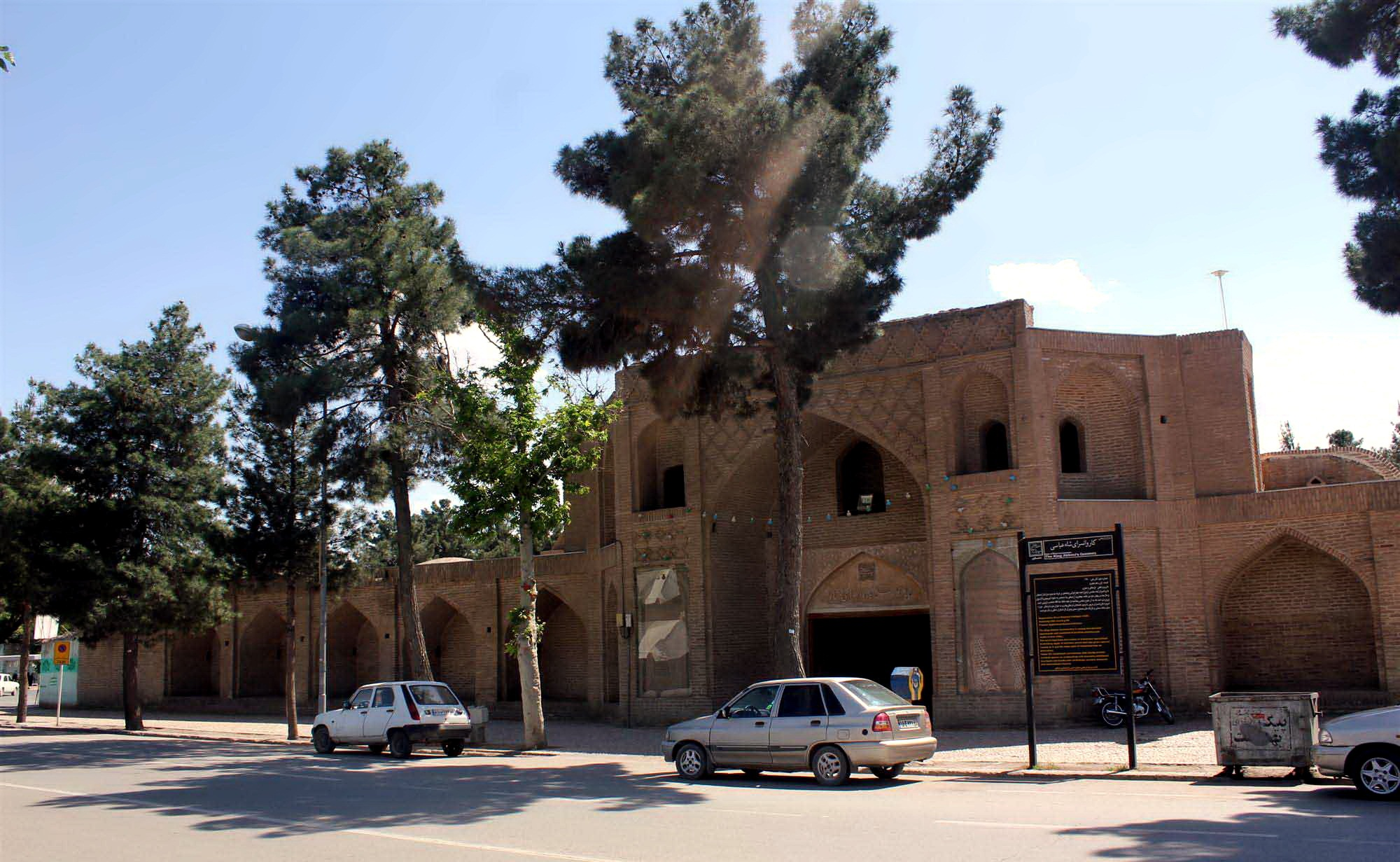
Exterior view of Shah Abbasi Caravansarai of Nishapur. Part of the national heritage list of Iran.

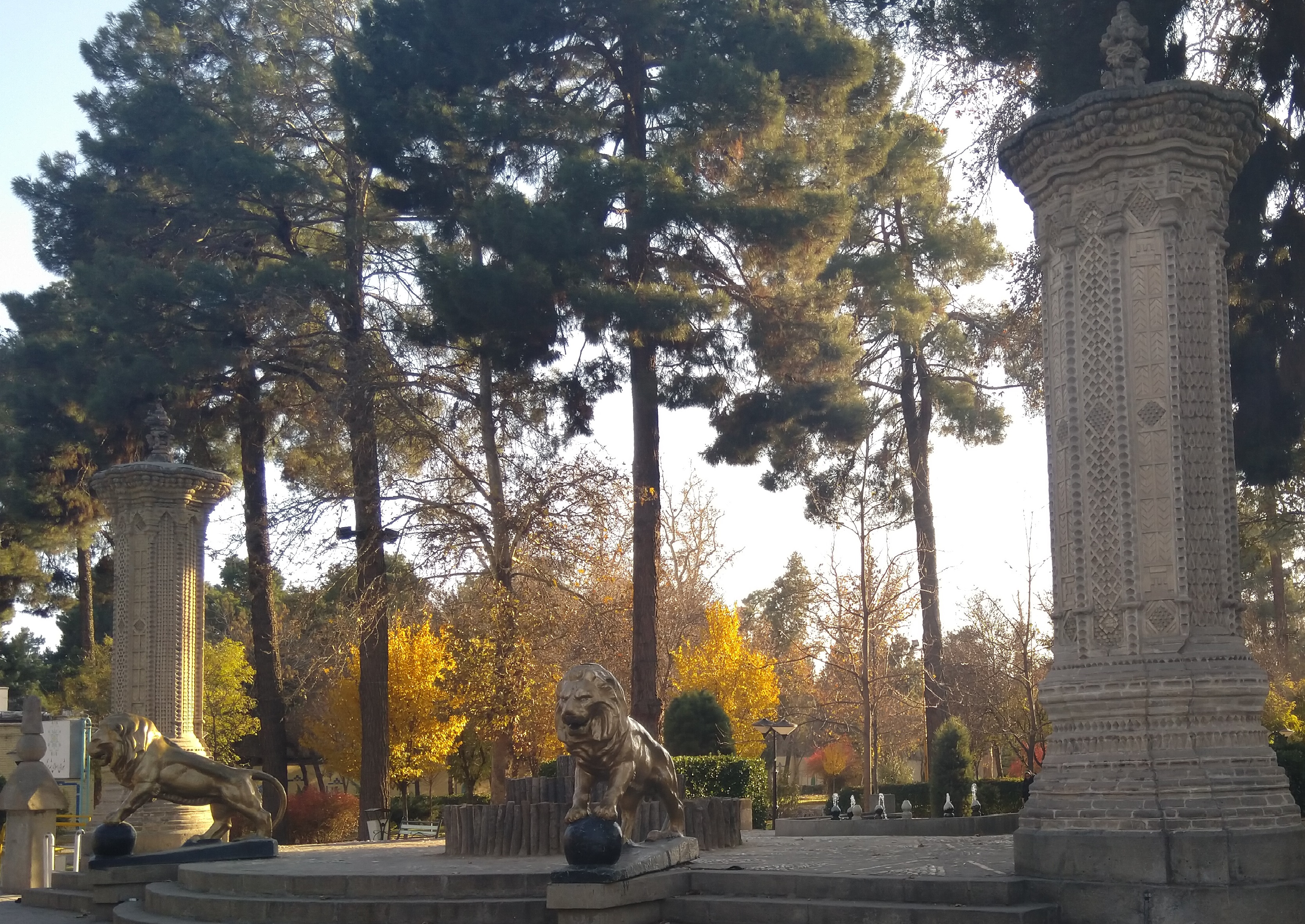
Entrance of the National Garden of Nishapur. Part of the national heritage list of Iran.

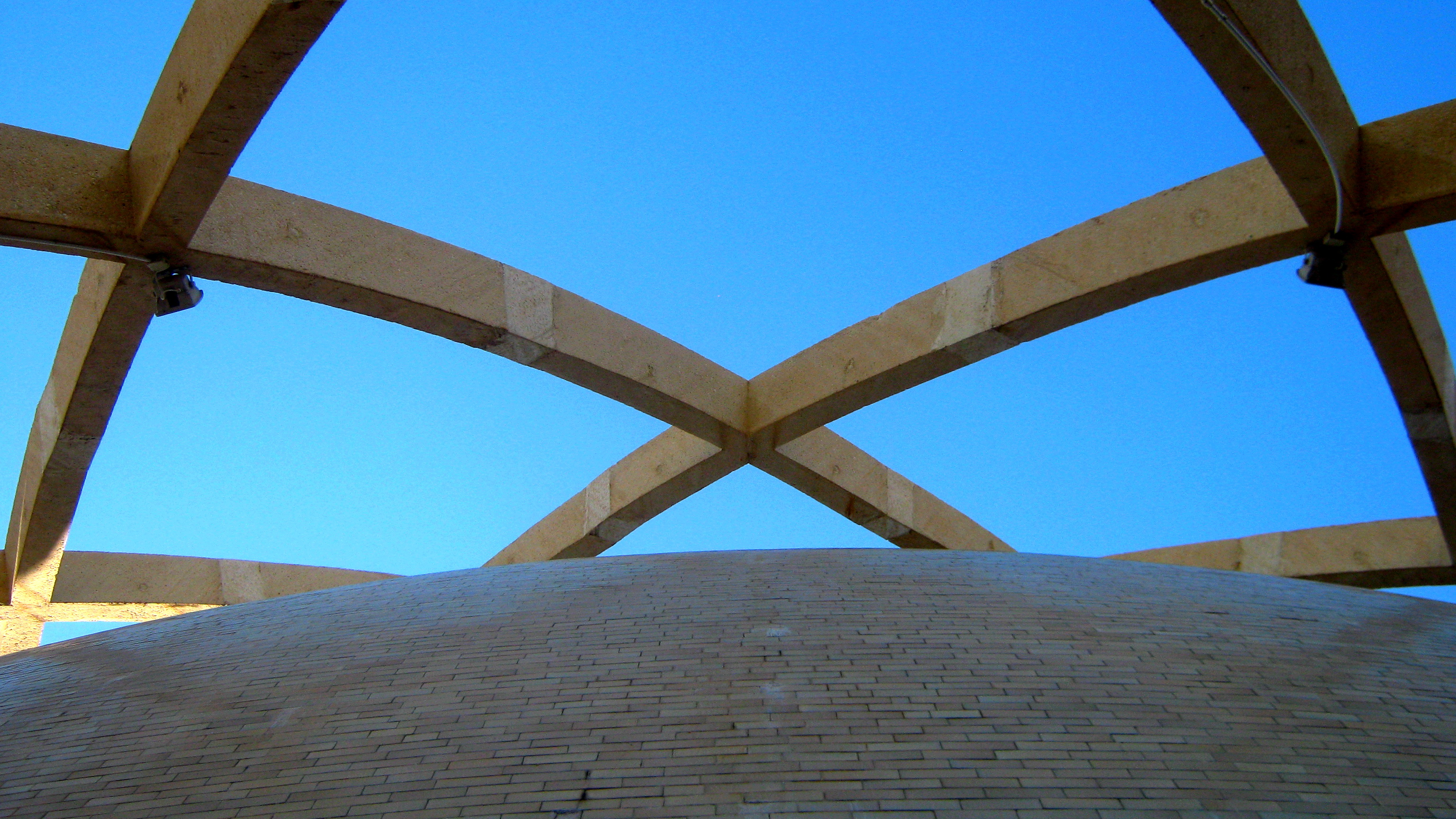
Dome of the Complex of Khayyam Planetarium, near Mausoleum of Omar Khayyam

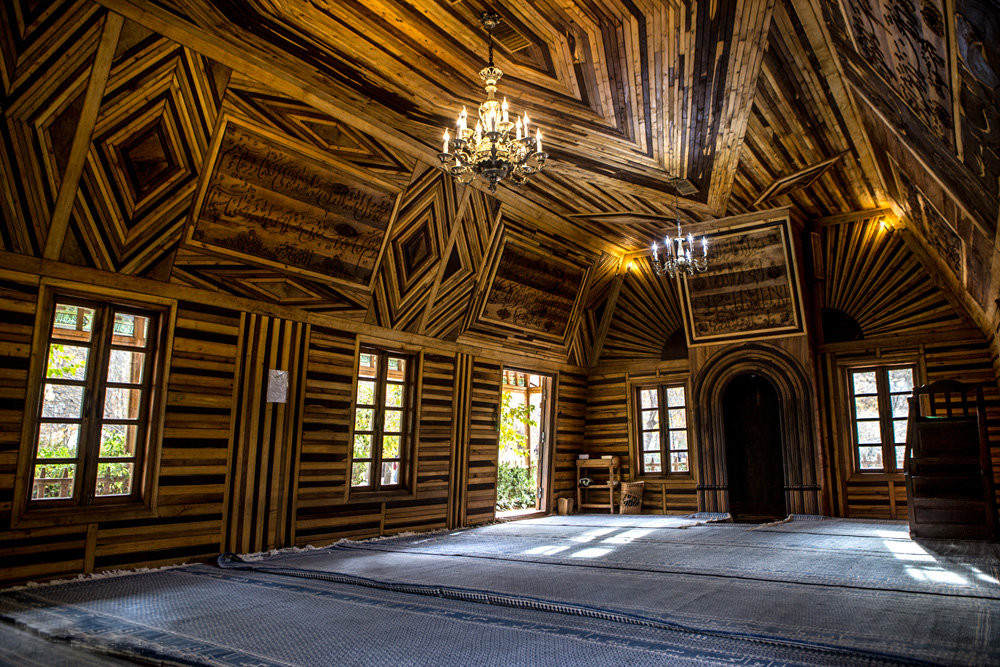
The interior of the Wooden Mosque of Neyshabur

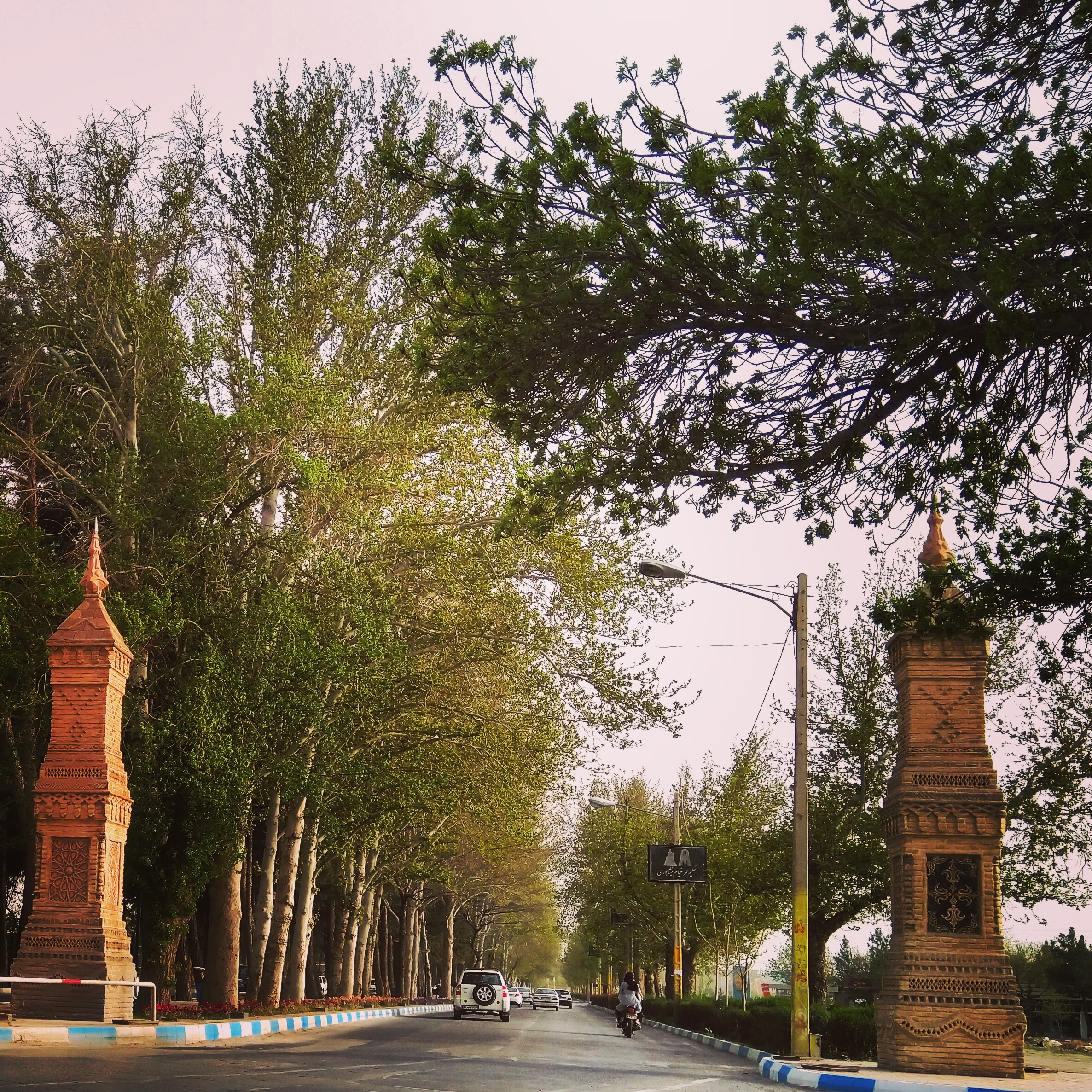
Monuments of the city gates of Nishapur which were built in the 1980s. Nishapur (2022). Part of the national heritage list of Iran.

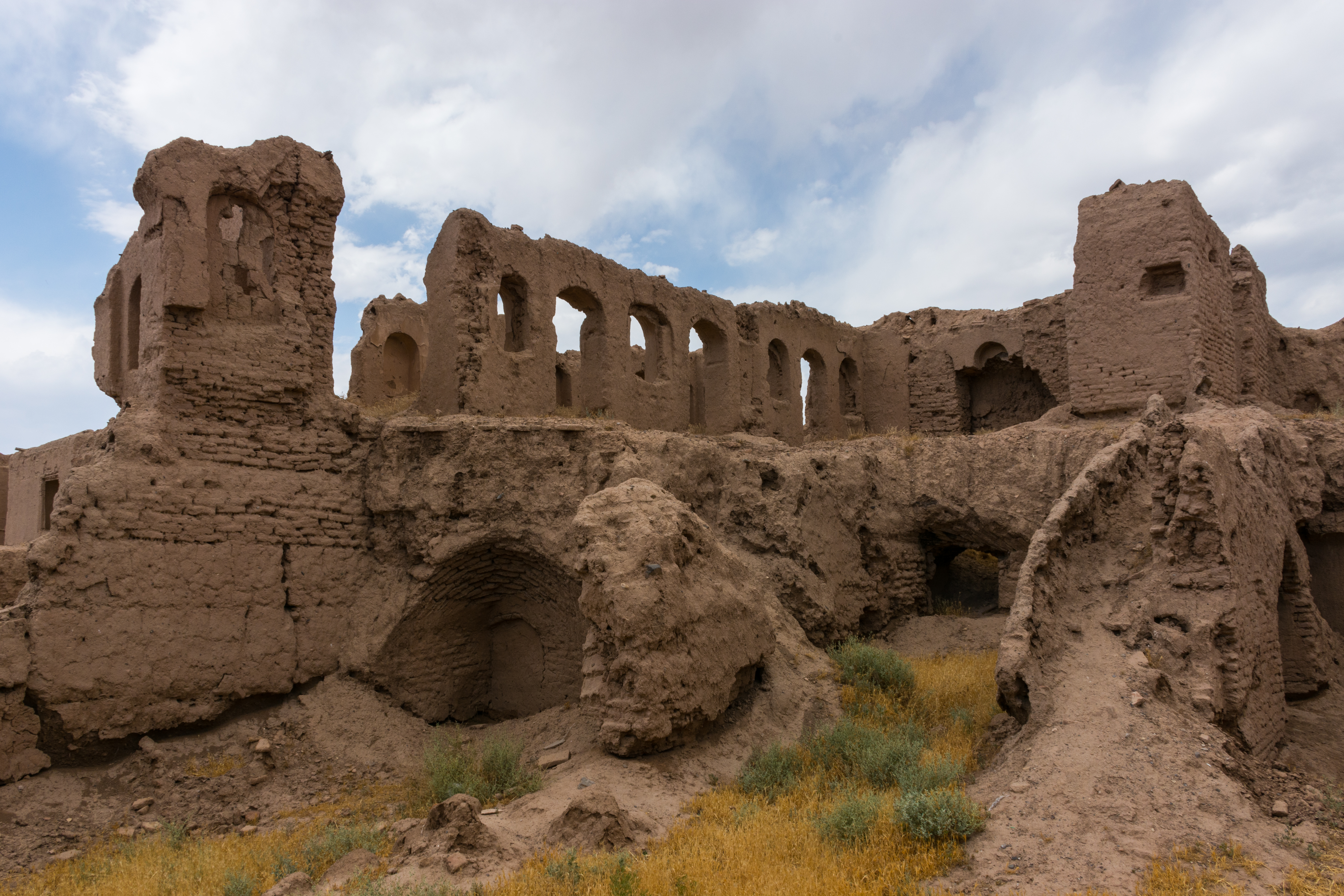
Lak Lak Ashian Castle (Qajar Iran 19th century). Part of the national heritage list of Iran.

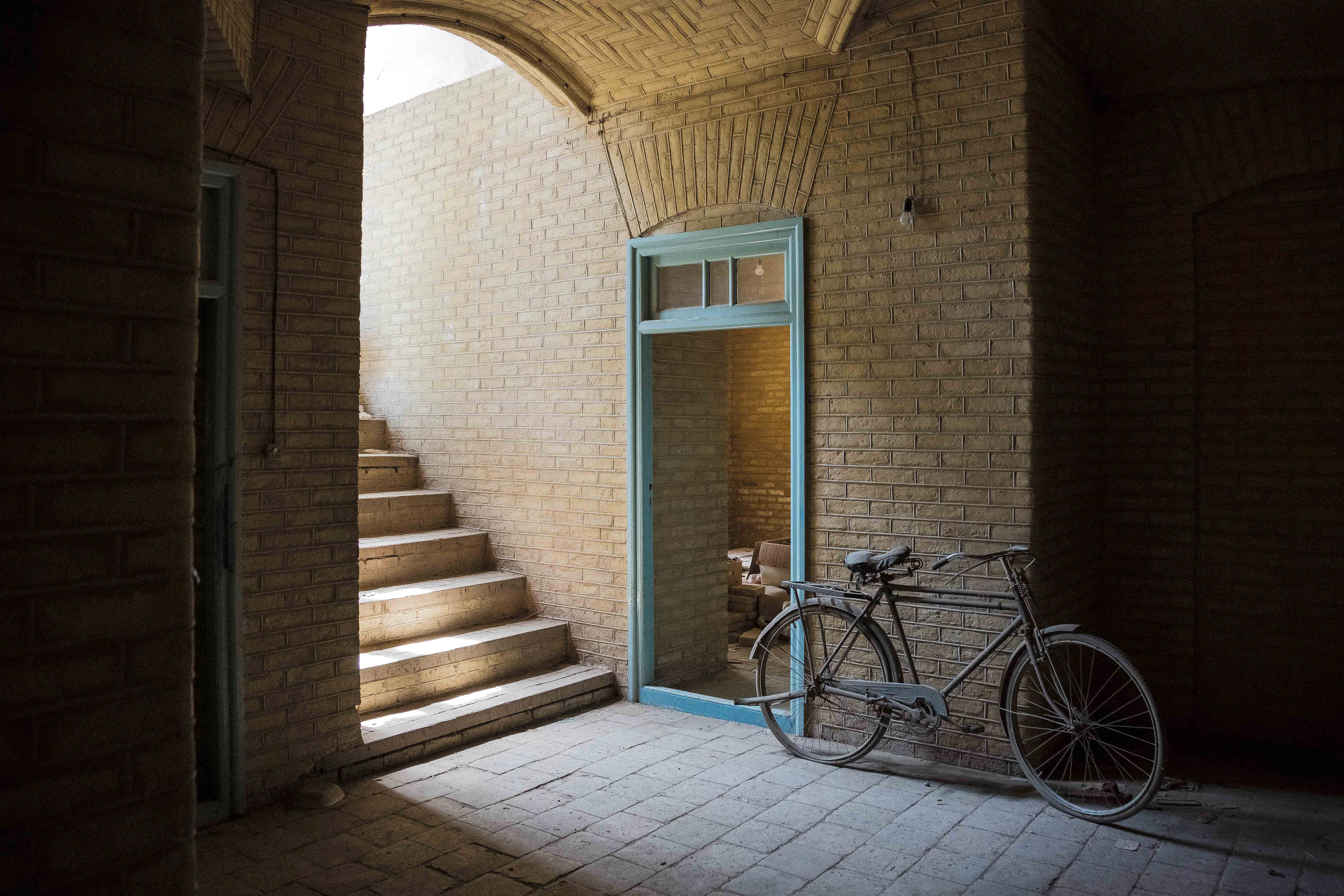
Khanate Mansion & Garden of Amin Islami. Part of the national heritage list of Iran.

=== Popular culture ===
- Nasir Khusraw saw Nishapur and wrote about it in Safarnama.
- Abraham Valentine Williams Jackson in "From Constantinople to the home of Omar Khayyam" explain ending of his Travel in Nishapur.

== Education ==
=== Schools, universities, and colleges ===
==== High schools ====
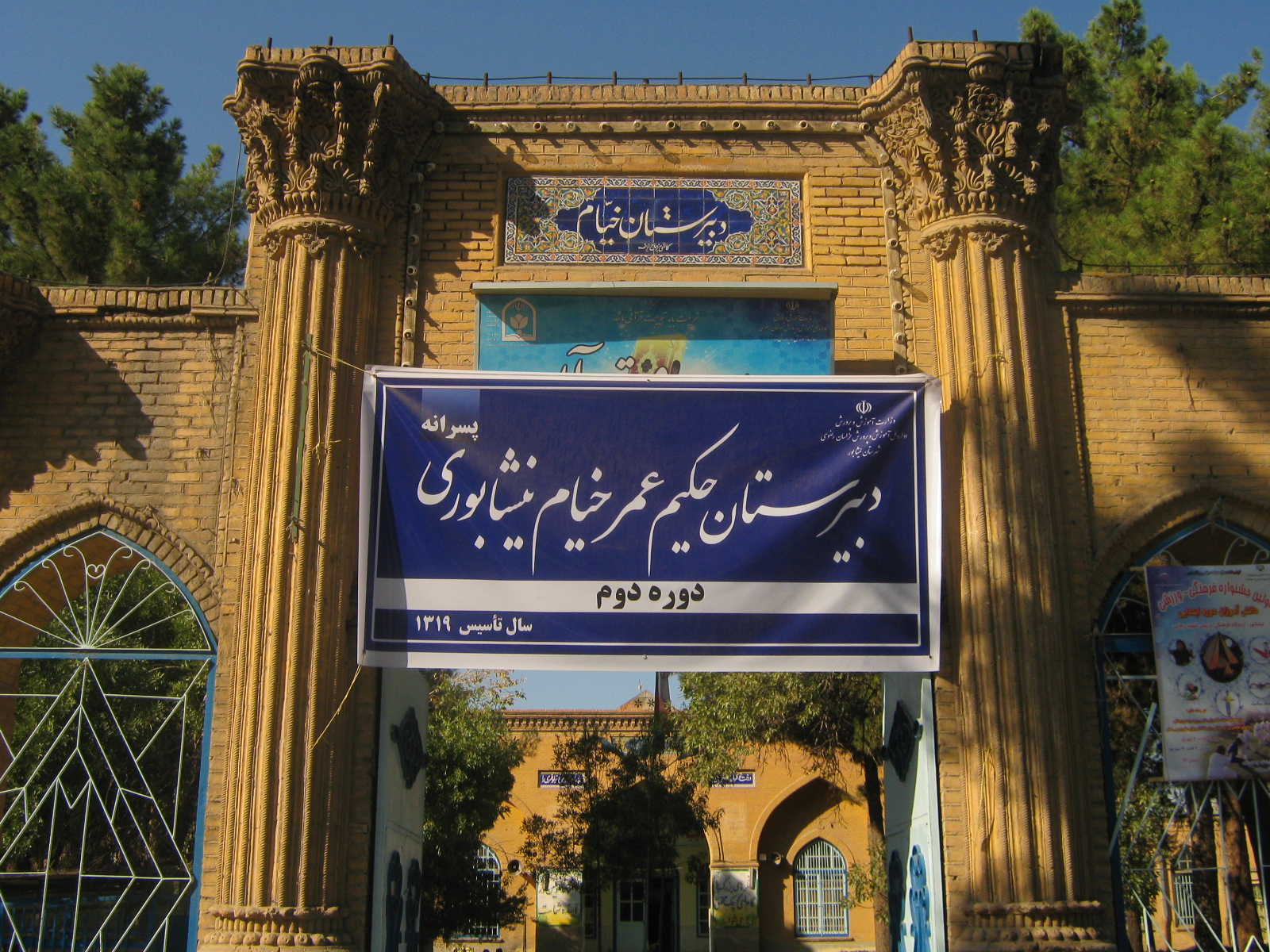
Gate of Omar Khayyam High School. Part of the national heritage of Iran.

There are several high schools in the city and the county. The most famous and the oldest of which is Omar Khayyam High School.

==== Higher education ====
The University of Neyshabur, Neyshabur University of Medical Sciences (NUMS), the Islamic Azad University of Neyshabur (IAUN), the Payame Noor University of Neyshabur, and the Technical and Vocational University of Neyshabur are the main universities of the city, along with several other public and private technical, vocational, and part-time colleges and schools.

=== Sport centers ===
Enghelab Sports Complex is an indoor arena in Nishapur. The arena houses Nishapur's basketball, volleyball, and futsal teams. Nishapur has one professional football team, Jahan Electric Nishapur, that competes in the Razavi Khorasan's Provincial Leagues.

== Mass media ==
=== Newspaper publishing ===
General publications in Nishapur include the weekly and local newspapers. The first local newspaper of Khorasan province is Morning of Nishapur, published since 1989. Others include Shadiakh, published since 2000, Khayyam Nameh, since 2004, Nasim, since 2006, and Far reh Simorgh, since 2010.

=== Public Broadcasting ===
IRIB center of Mashhad covers the news of Nishapur.

=== Printing ===
Two book publishers working in the city are Klidar & Abar Shahr.

== Twin towns – sister cities ==
Nishapur is twinned with:

- Baghdad, Iraq
- Balkh, Afghanistan
- Basra, Iraq
- Bukhara, Uzbekistan
- Ghazni, Afghanistan
- Herat, Afghanistan
- Kairouan, Tunisia
- Karbala, Iraq
- Khiva, Uzbekistan
- Khoy, Iran
- Khujand, Tajikistan
- Konya, Turkey
- Kulob, Tajikistan
- Merv, Turkmenistan
- Samarkand, Uzbekistan
- Shahin Shahr, Iran

== See also ==
- Adur Burzen-Mihr
- Merv
- Herat
- Balkh
- Samarkand
- Bukhara
- Nishapur County
- University of Neyshabur
- Islamic Azad University Neyshabur Branch
- Saeedi Garden

Media related to Nishapur at Wikimedia Commons

Quotations related to Nishapur at Wikiquote

Nishapur travel guide from Wikivoyage

== Bibliography ==
- Bosworth, C.E. (1975). "The Tahirids and the Saffarids". In Frye, R.N. (ed.). The Cambridge History of Iran. Vol. 4: The Period from the Arab invasion to the Saljuqs. Cambridge University Press. pp. 90–135. ISBN 0-521-20093-8.
- Esposito, John L., ed. (1999). The Oxford History of Islam. Oxford University Press.
- Honigmann, E.; Bosworth, C.E. (1995). "Nishapur". In Bosworth, C.E.; Van Donzel, E.; Heinrichs, W.P.; Lecomte, G. (eds.). The Encyclopedia of Islam. Vol. VIII: Ned-Sam. Brill. pp. 62–64. ISBN 90-04-09834-8.
- Ibn Al-Athir (2007). The Chronicle of Ibn Al-Athir for the Crusading Period from Al-Kamil Fi'l-Tarikh. Translated by Richards, D.S. Ashgate Publishing.
- Kennedy, Hugh (2001). The Armies of the Caliphs: Military and Society in the Early Islamic State. London and New York: Routledge. ISBN 0-415-25093-5.
- Kröger, Jens (1995). Nishapur: Glass of the Early Islamic Period. The Metropolitan Museum of Art.
- Peacock, A.C.S. (2015). The Great Seljuk Empire. Edinburgh University Press.
- Tor, D.G. (2015). "The Importance of Khurasan and Transoxiana in the Persianate Dynastic Period (850–1220)". In Peacock, A. C. S.; Tor, D. G. (eds.). Medieval Central Asia and the Persianate World: Iranian Tradition and Islamic Civilisation. I.B. Tauris. pp. 1–12.
- Pourshariati, Parvaneh (2000). "Local Historiography in Early Medieval Iran and the Tārīkh-i Bayhaq". Iranian Studies. 33 (1/2 (Winter – Spring)): 133–164. doi:10.1080/00210860008701979. JSTOR 4311337.
- Tarkhi Al Naisaburiin Bye Hakim al-Nishaburi
- EARTHQUAKES IN THE HISTORY OF NISHAPUR By Charles Melville
- Encyclopedia Iranica
- metmuseum
- iranica
- The Patricians of Nishapur: A Study in Medieval Islamic Social History by Richard Bulliet
- France-Diplomatie

Preceded by -	Capital of Seljuq Empire (Persia); 1037–1043	Succeeded by Rey
