= Ghafari =

Ghafari is a surname. Notable people with the surname include:

- Marc Ghafari (born 1991), Lebanese American basketball player
- Shafiqullah Ghafari (born 2001), Afghan cricketer
- Yousif Ghafari (born 1952), Lebanese American businessman
- Zarifa Ghafari, Afghan advocate, activist, politician and entrepreneur

== See also ==
- Ghaffari, is an Iranian family name
