= Mirror Hall =

Painting by Kamal-ol-Molk

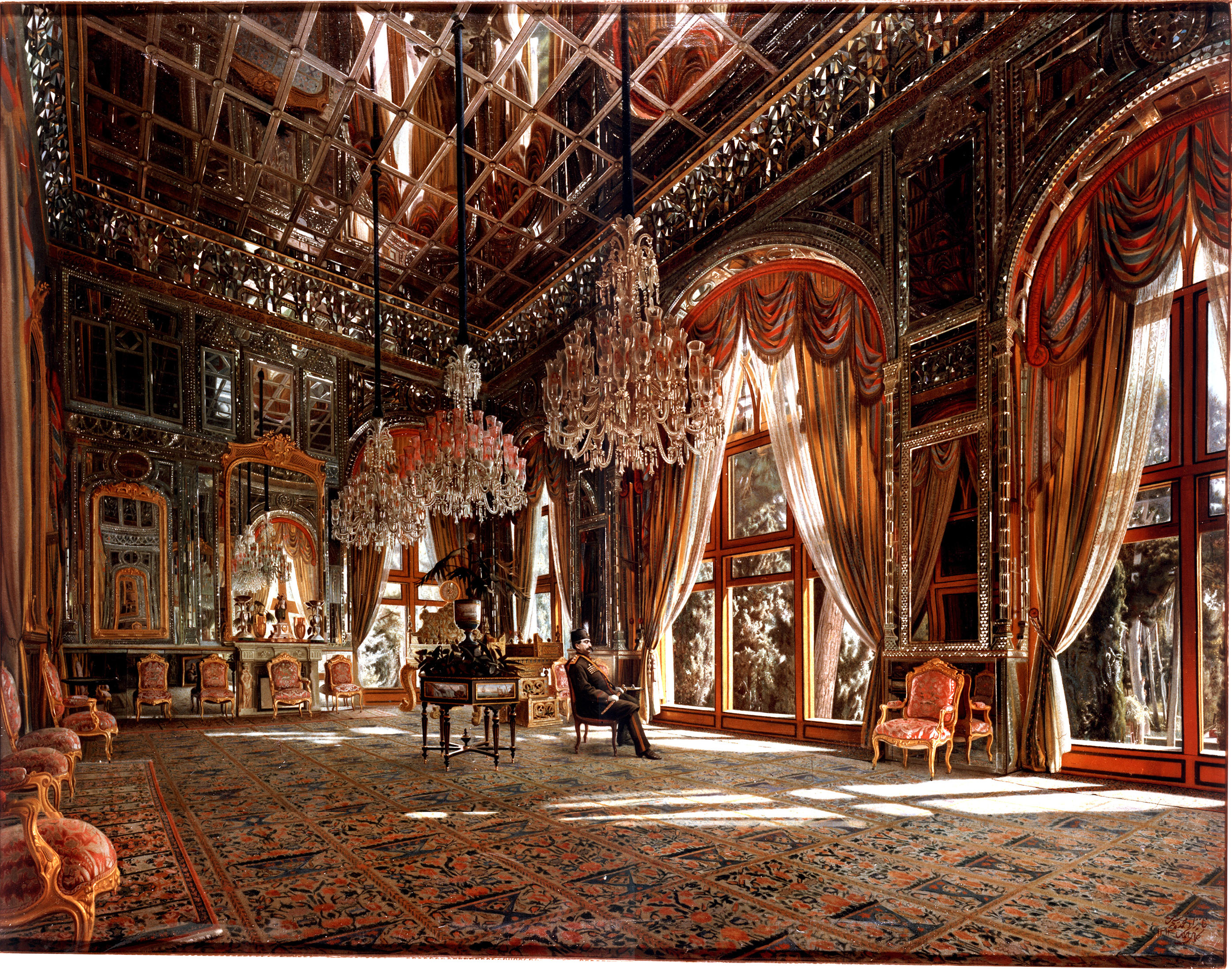
- Artist: Kamal-ol-Molk
- Year: 1876
- Medium: Oil on canvas
- Movement: Realism
- Dimensions: 90 cm × 100 cm (35 in × 39 in)
- Location: Golestan Palace; Tehran

Mirror Hall (Persian: تالار آینه, romanized: Tālār-e Āyeneh) is an oil on canvas painting by Iranian realist painter Kamal-ol-Molk, his first work since receiving the title Kamal-ol-Molk ("Perfection of the Realm"). It is considered one of his masterpieces, and marks a starting point in Iran's modern art.

The painting was executed in over five years, depicting Naser-ed-Din Shah sitting on a chair in front of a window at the Mirror Hall of the Golestan Palace, the chief residence of the Qajar dynasty.

The completion of the painting coincided with the Shah's murder in 1896, and the accession of his son, Mozaffar-ed-Din Shah.

Kamal-ol-Molk was later questioned about the theft of some precious gems located at the hall, but the actual culprit was eventually found.

The Mirror Hall is famous for its remarkable ayeneh-kari. It was designed by architect Abul Hassan Memar Bashi Esfahani (1245–1305 AH / 1829–1888 AD) (nicknamed Sani-ol-Molk), while Minister of Architecture Yahya Khan (Mowtamed-ol-Molk) was the consultant.

== See also ==
- The Doshan Tappeh Street, another work by Kamal-ol-Molk.
