= Ghaffari =

Ghaffari (Persian/Iranian: غفاری) is a surname, often associated with Iranian families from the Kashan region. However the name is found all over Iran and elsewhere, as families historically Iran did not have last names until governmental policies instituted within the 20th century, hence the name can be found all over Iran, such as Mazandaran and Semnan.

== People with the surname Ghaffari ==
- Abu'l-Hasan Khan Ghaffari Kashani (also known as Sani al Mulk (Abu'l-Hasan);1814–1866), Iranian painter
- Cihangir Ghaffari (born 1940), Iranian actor and film producer
- Hadi Ghaffari (born 1950), Iranian political Ayatollah
- Siamak Matt Ghaffari (born 1961), Iran-born American Olympic wrestler and mixed martial artist
- Mohammad Ghaffari (known as Kamal-Ol-Molk; 1848–1940), Iranian painter and Freemason
- Roozbeh Ghaffari, American biomedical engineer and neuroscientist
- Saeed Reza Ghaffari (born 1962), Iranian scientist and physician
- Parvin Ghaffari (blind) (born 1952), Iranian City council woman in Tehran 1977 to 1979
