= Shadiyakh =

Coordinates: 36°10′10″N 58°48′15″E

- شادیاخ, شادی کاخ, شادی یاخ (Persian)
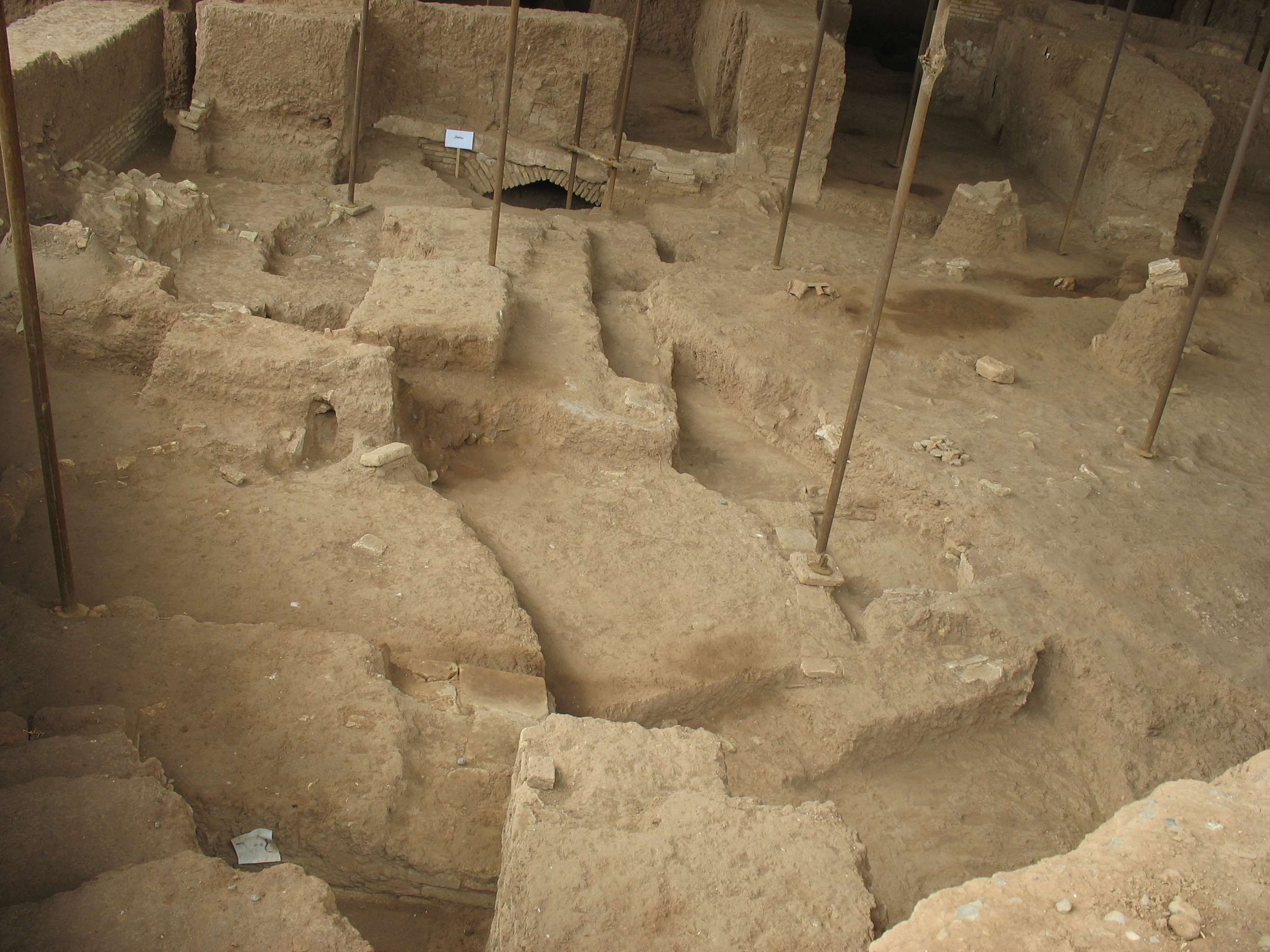
- Shadiyakh after the year 2000 Archaeological excavations
- Interactive map of Shadiyakh
- Location: Nishapur, Greater Khorasan

History
- Built: During the Tahirid dynasty rule over Greater Khorasan

Site notes
- Owner: Ministry of Cultural Heritage, Handicrafts and Tourism of Iran

Shadiyakh or Shadyakh (Persian: شادیاخ, presumably, a contracted form of شادی کاخ, Shadi-Kakh means (The) Palace of Happiness) was one of the main palaces, gardens and great neighborhoods of Nishapur in the Middle Ages. It was established by Abdullah ibn Tahir al-Khurasani in the 9th century AD, becoming more important and populated after that. Some notable people like Attar of Nishapur lived there. Attar's tomb is now in that area. This palace was perhaps completely ruined in 13th century AD. Shadyakh Is now an archeological site open to tourists and it is part of the national heritage list of Iran, with the registration number of 10910.

== Archaeology ==
Excavations began in 2000 there and continued for around 2 years: buildings (possibly a palace), skeletons, equipment and other items were discovered by archeologists.
