= The Zoka-ol-Molk I =

Painting by Kamal-ol-molk

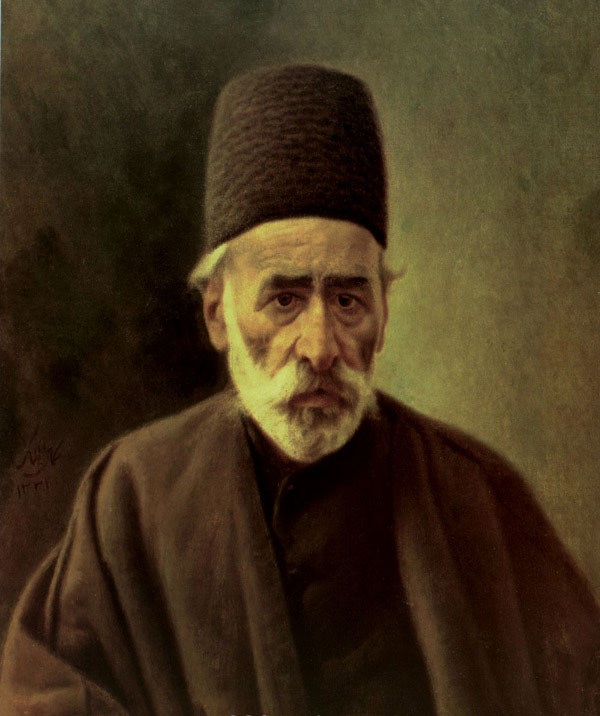
- Artist: Kamal-ol-molk
- Year: 1913
- Type: Oil on cotton duck
- Dimensions: 64 cm × 53 cm (25 in × 21 in)
- Location: Museum of Islamic Consultative Assembly; Tehran

The Zoka-ol-Molk I is a painting by the Iranian realism painter Kamal-ol-molk with oil on cotton duck. It was painted in 1913 and features portrait of Mohammad Hossein Foroughi titled Zoka-ol-Molk I father of Mohammad Ali Foroughi titled Zoka-ol-Molk II.

== Sources ==
- commons.wikimedia.org
