= Mausoleum of Kamal-ol-Molk =

Tomb in Nishapur County, Iranian national heritage site

- آرامگاه کمال‌الملک
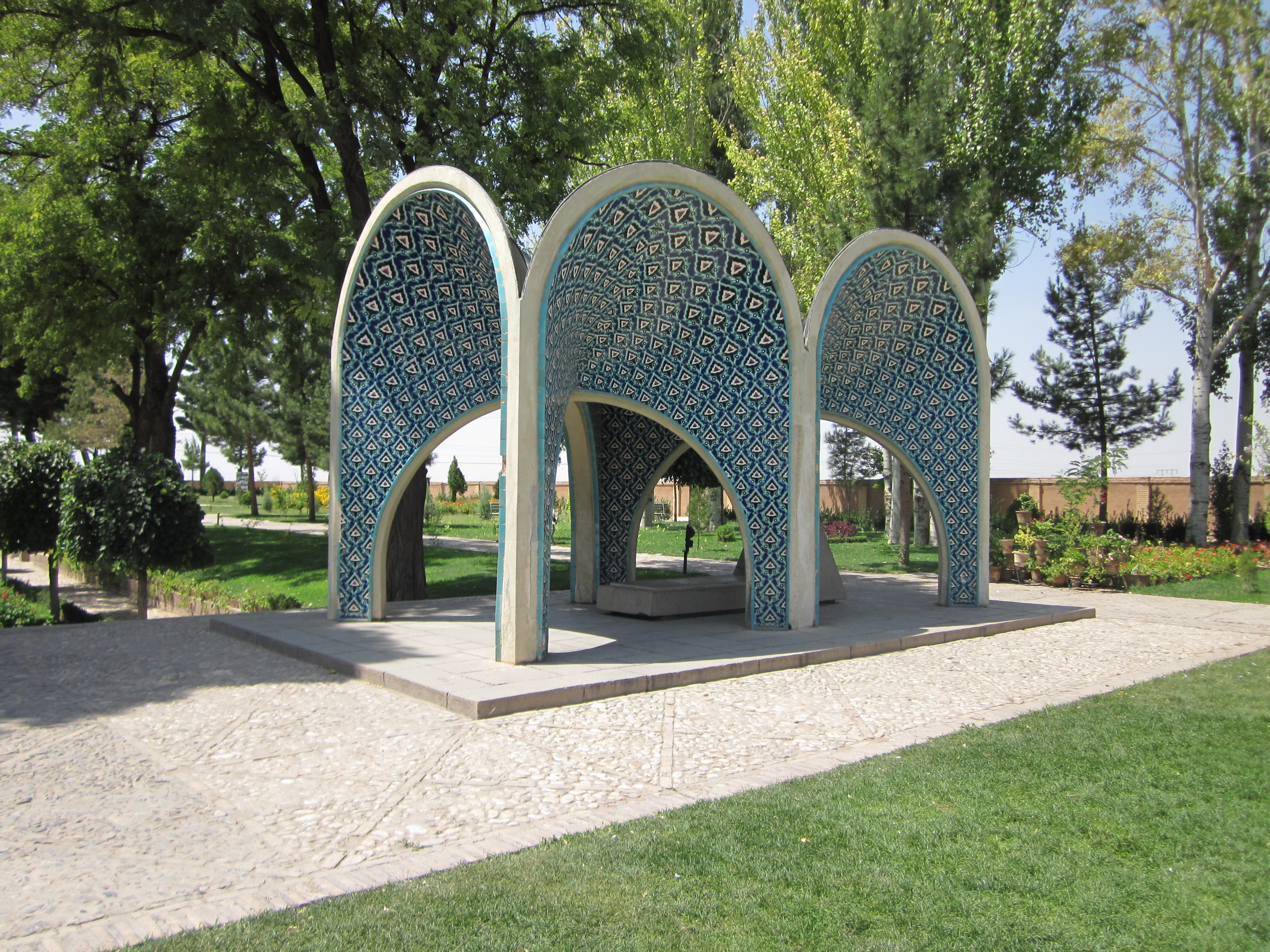
- The mausoleum in 2010

- Location of the shrine in Iran

Religion
- Affiliation: Islam
- Ecclesiastical or organizational status: Mausoleum
- Status: Active
- Dedication: Kamal-ol-molk

Location
- Location: Orafa Blvd, Nishapur, Razavi Khorasan province
- Country: Iran
- Interactive map of Mausoleum of Kamal-ol-Molk
- Coordinates: 36°10′3″N 58°48′26″E

Architecture
- Architect: Hooshang Seyhoun
- Type: Islamic architecture
- Style: Pahlavi
- Completed: 1963 CE

Iran National Heritage List
- Official name: Mausoleum of Kamal-ol-Molk
- Type: Built
- Designated: 31 May 2003
- Reference no.: 8744
- Conservation organization: Cultural Heritage, Handicrafts and Tourism Organization of Iran

The Mausoleum of Kamal-ol-Molk (Persian: آرامگاه کمال‌الملک; Arabic: ضريح كمال الملك) (Note: Also known as the Kamal al-Molk Mausoleum, the Kamalolmolk's Tomb, the Kamal Al Molk Tomb, the Tomb of Mohammad Ghaffari, and the Mausoleum of Mohammad Ghaffari.) is a mausoleum, located in the south-east of the city of Nishapur, in the province of Razavi Khorasan, Iran. The structure, completed in 1963, contains the tomb of Kamal-ol-Molk (1848—1940), a famous Persian painter.

The mausoleum was added to the Iran National Heritage List on 31 May 2003 and is administered by the Cultural Heritage, Handicrafts and Tourism Organization of Iran.

== Overview ==
Kamal-ol-Molk died in 1940. However, the mausoleum was not completed until 1963. Designed in the Pahlavi style by Hooshang Seyhoun, a famous Iranian architect, the mausoleum was opened on 1 April 1963 in the presence of Farah Pahlavi, the Shahbanu of the Imperial State of Iran.

The building is located near the Tomb of Attar of Nishapur.

== Gallery ==
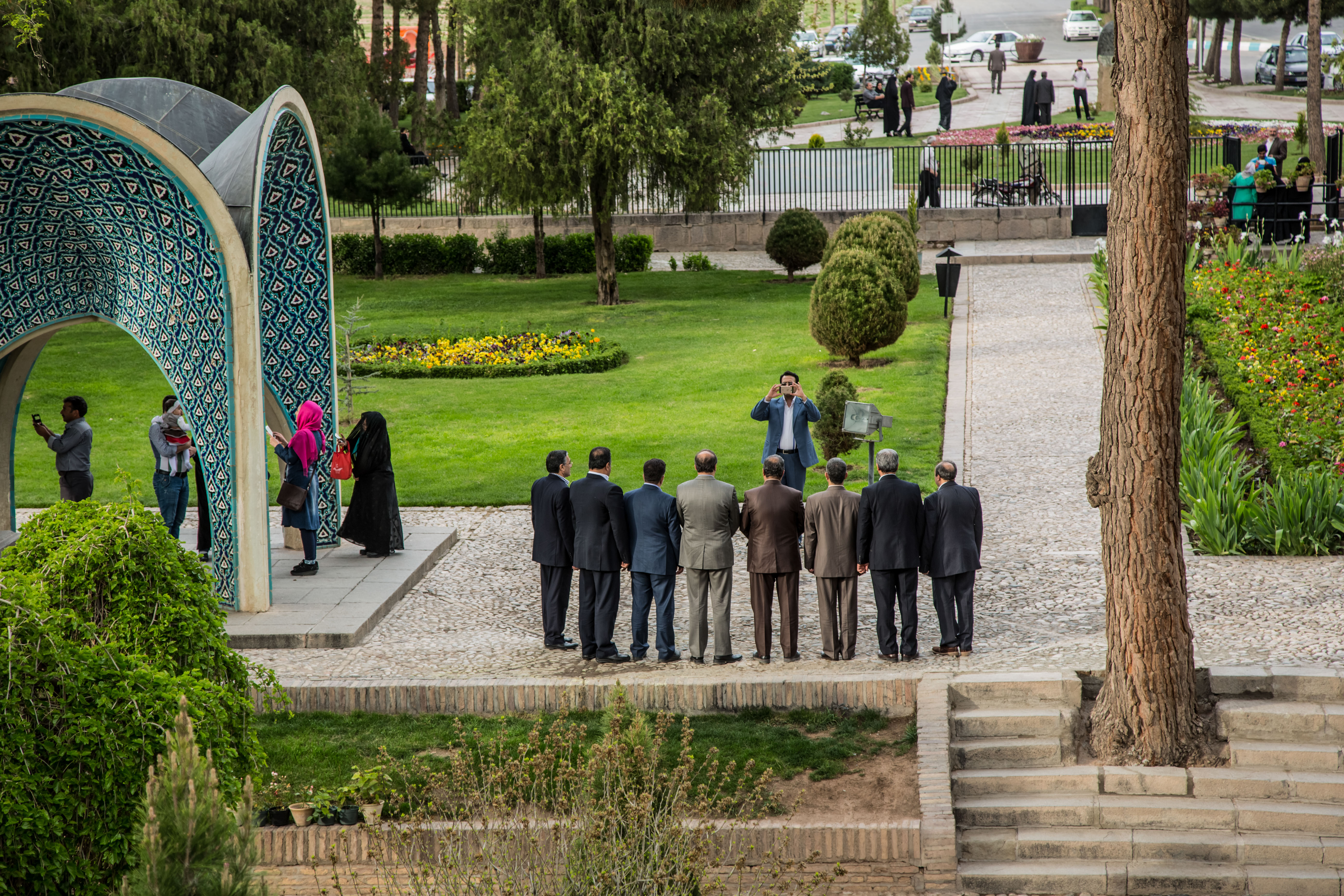

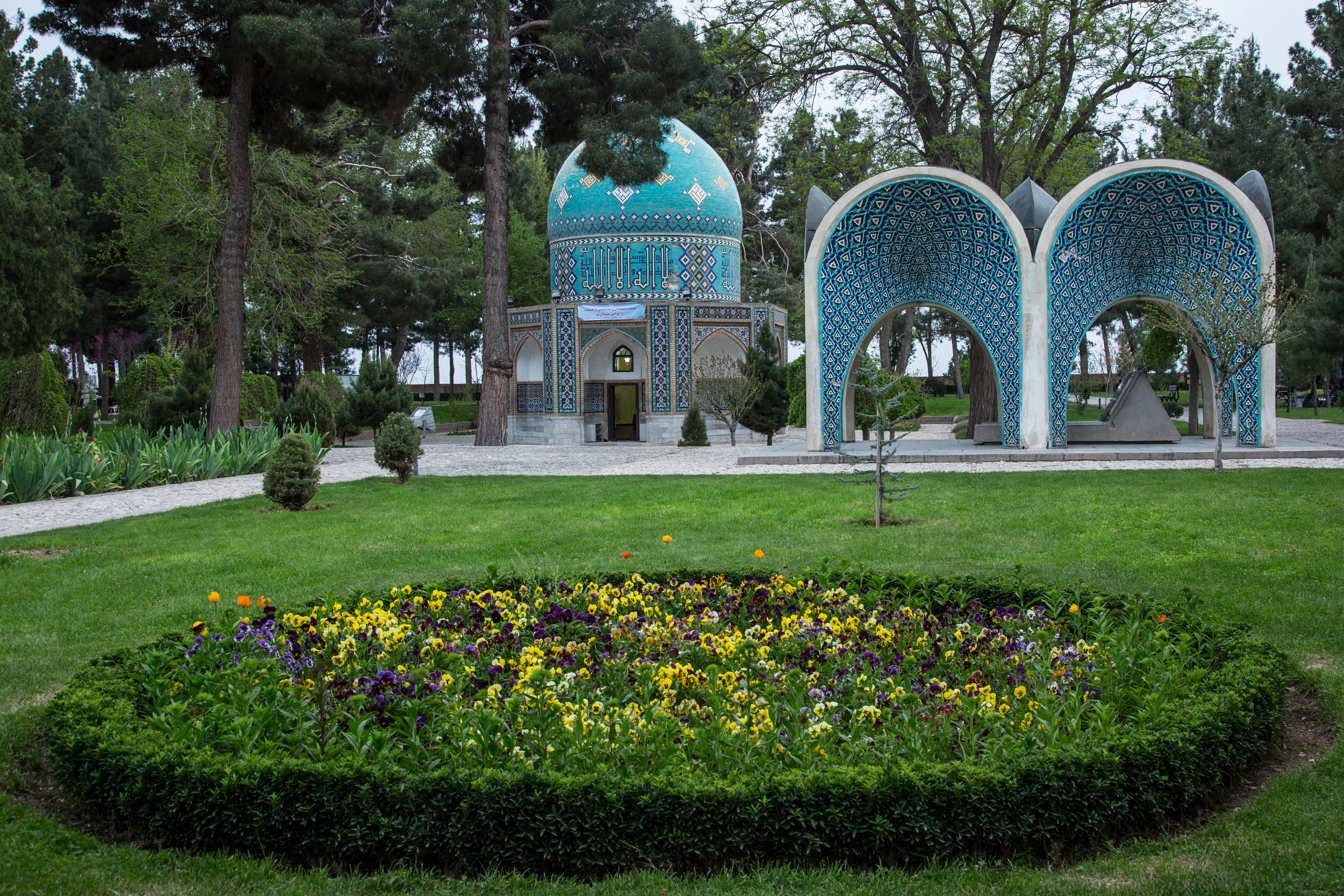

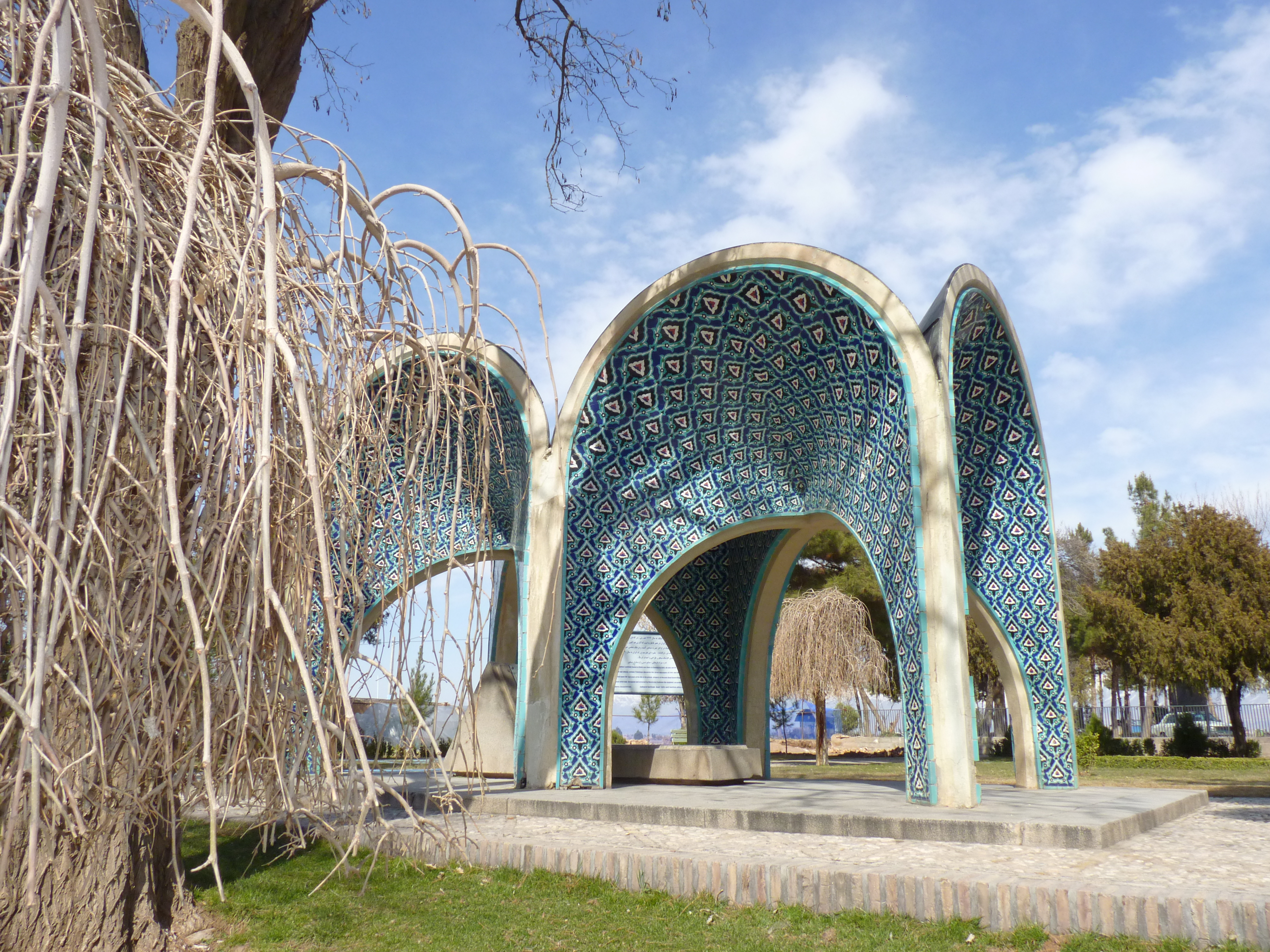

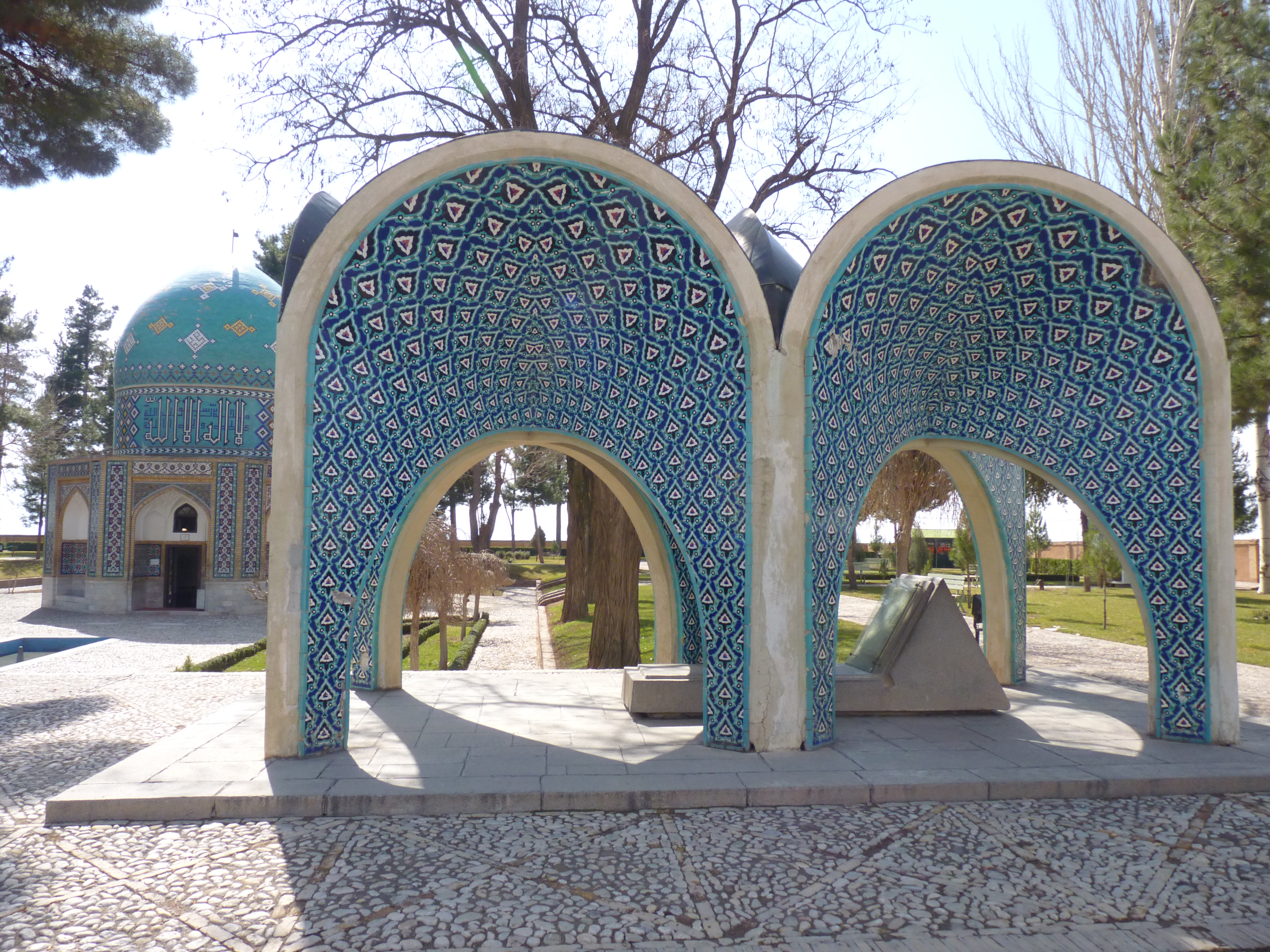

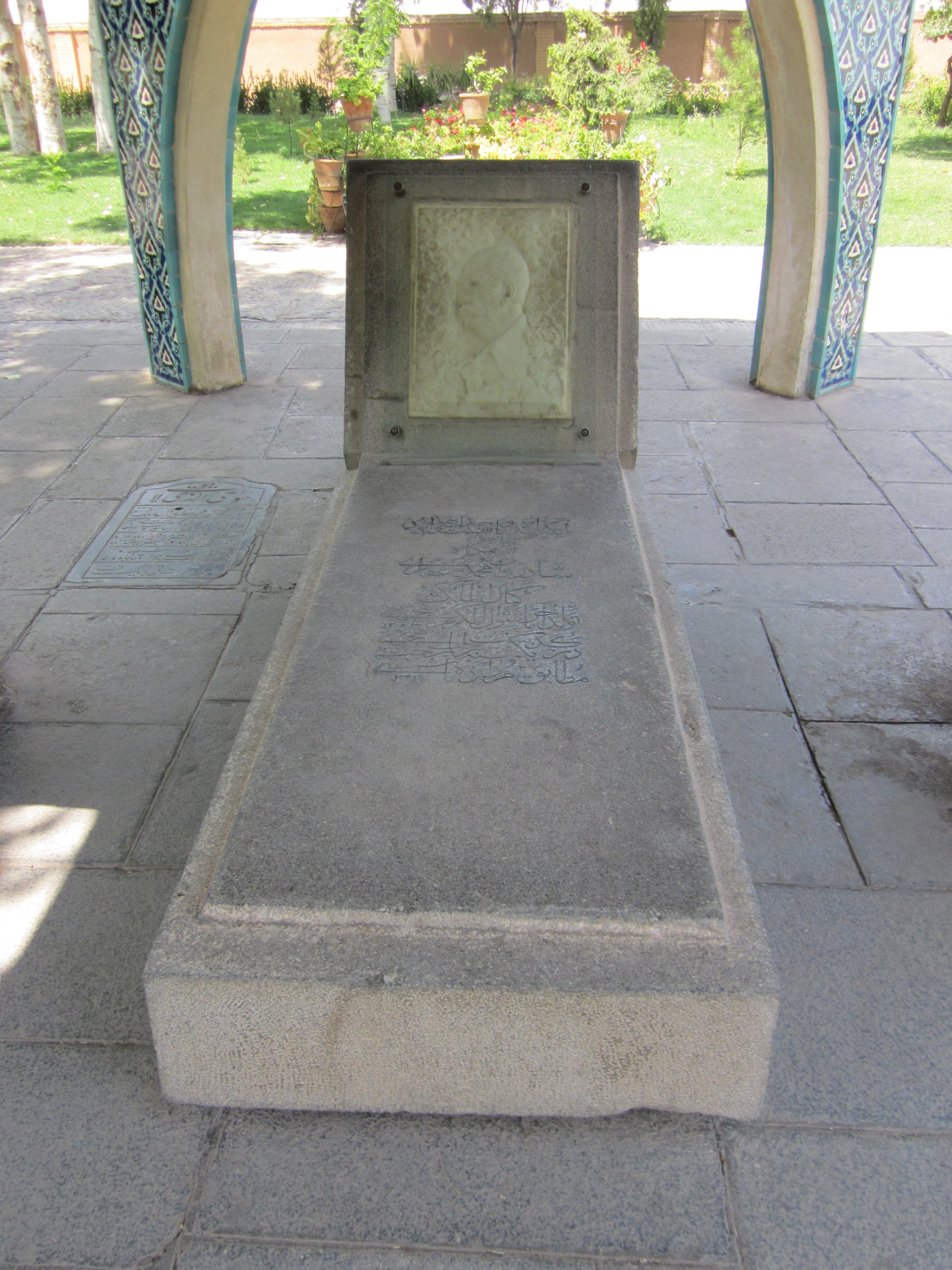

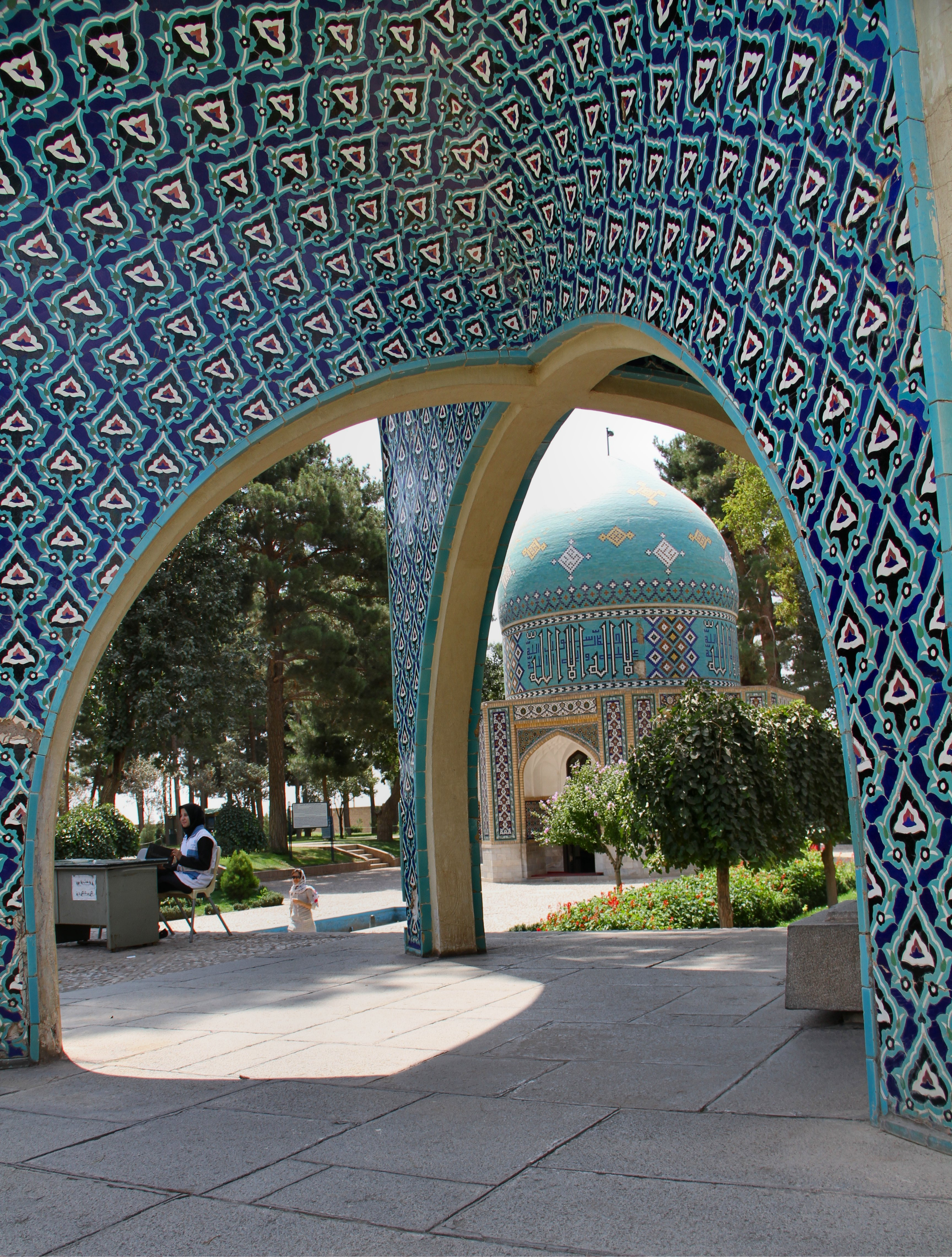

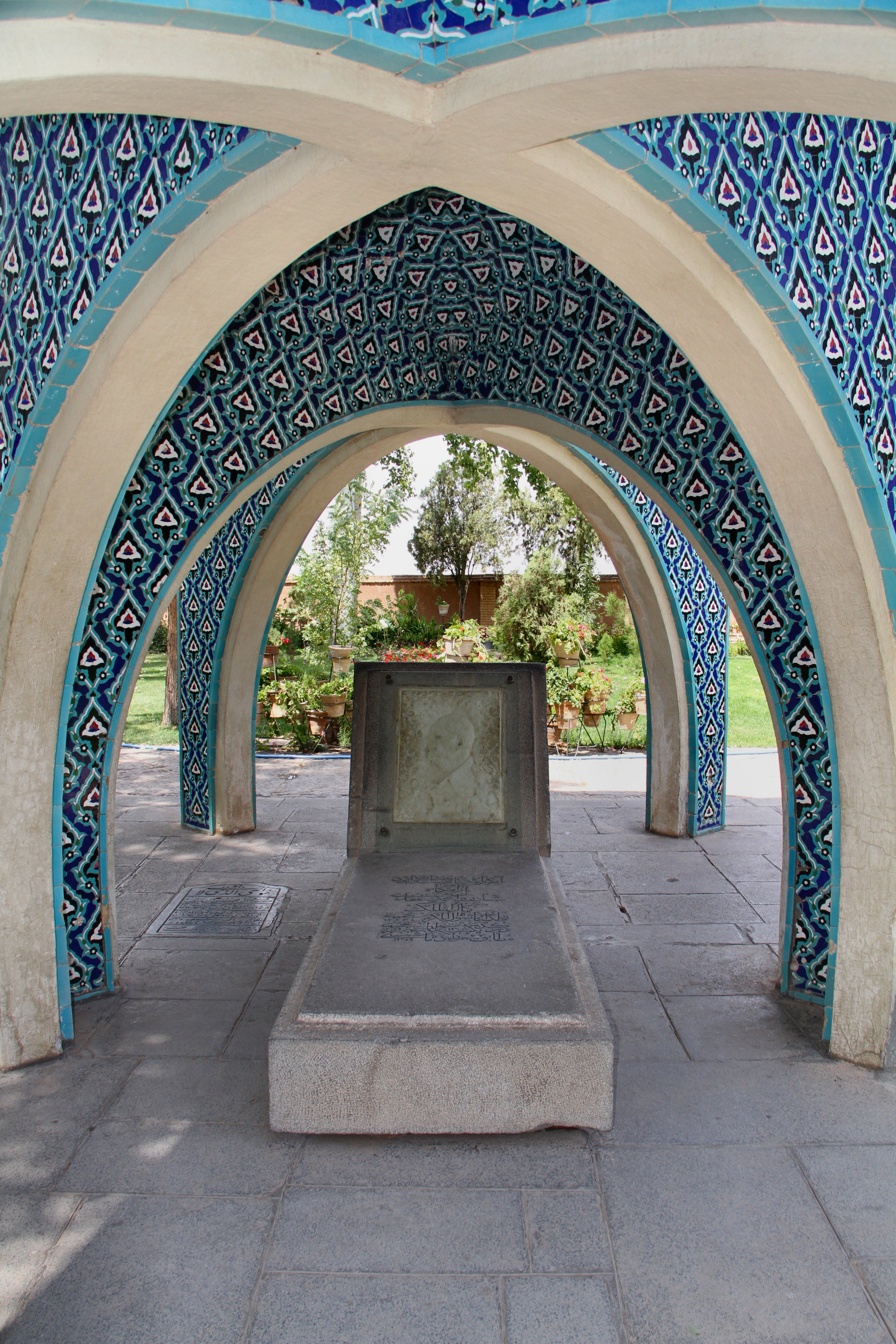

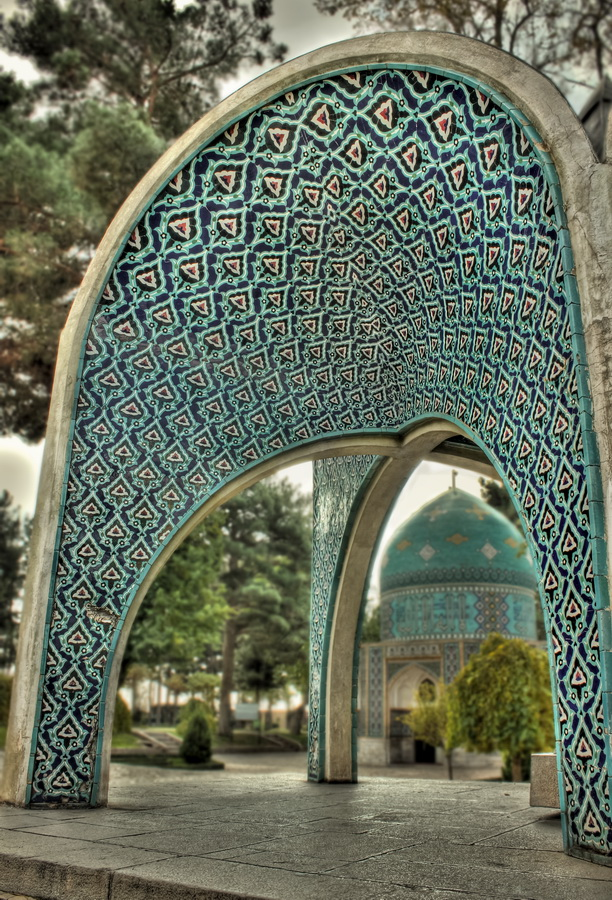

== See also ==
- List of mausoleums in Iran
