= Mausoleum of Attar of Nishapur =

Burial site of a Sufi poet in Iran

- آرامگاه عطار نیشابوری
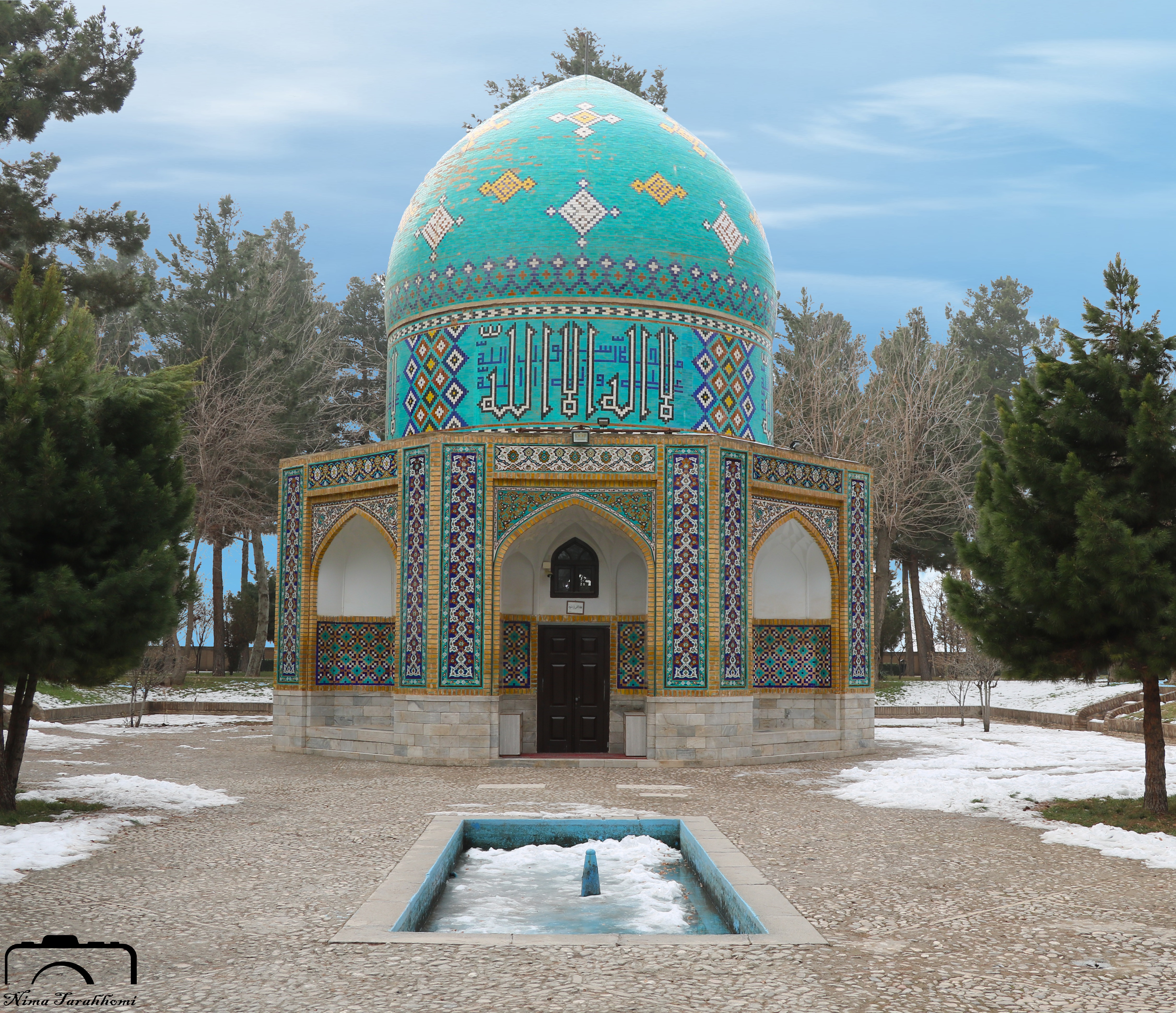
- The mausoleum exterior in winter 2022

- Location of the complex in Iran

Religion
- Affiliation: Islam
- Ecclesiastical or organizational status: Mausoleum
- Status: Active

Location
- Location: Nishapur, Razavi Khorasan province
- Country: Iran
- Interactive map of Mausoleum of Attar of Nishapur
- Coordinates: 36°10′02″N 58°48′25″E

Architecture
- Type: Islamic architecture
- Style: Timurid
- Founder: Ali-Shir Nava'i
- Completed: 15th century

Specifications
- Dome: One
- Shrine: One: Attar of Nishapur
- Materials: Bricks; mortar; plaster; tiles

Iran National Heritage List
- Official name: Mausoleum of Attar of Nishapur
- Type: Built
- Designated: 9 December 1975
- Reference no.: 1173
- Conservation organization: Cultural Heritage, Handicrafts and Tourism Organization of Iran

The Mausoleum of Attar of Nishapur (Persian: آرامگاه عطار نیشابوری, romanized: Aramgah-e Attar; Arabic: ضريح العطار) (Note: Also known as the Tomb of Attar-e Neyshabouri and the Mausoleum of Shaikh Attar Neyshaboori.) is a mausoleum, located 6 kilometres (3.7 mi) west of Nishapur, in the northeastern province of Razavi Khorasan, Iran. The complex was built by the order of Ali-Shir Nava'i in the 15th century CE, during the Timurid era, and contains the tomb of Attar of Nishapur. It is located near the Mausoleum of Omar Khayyám.

The complex was added to the Iran National Heritage List on 9 December 1975, administered by the Cultural Heritage, Handicrafts and Tourism Organization of Iran.

== Overview ==
The structure is octagonal in shape with a tile worked onion shaped dome. It has four entrances, the northern one is the main entrance. The structure is adorned with coloured (green, yellow and blue) tiles and carvings. The interior site is covered by plaster and has four seats. The mausoleum is located in a garden covering an area of approximately 119 square metres (1,280 sq ft). The grave of the well known painter Kamal-ol-molk is also situated in a part of this garden.

== Gallery ==
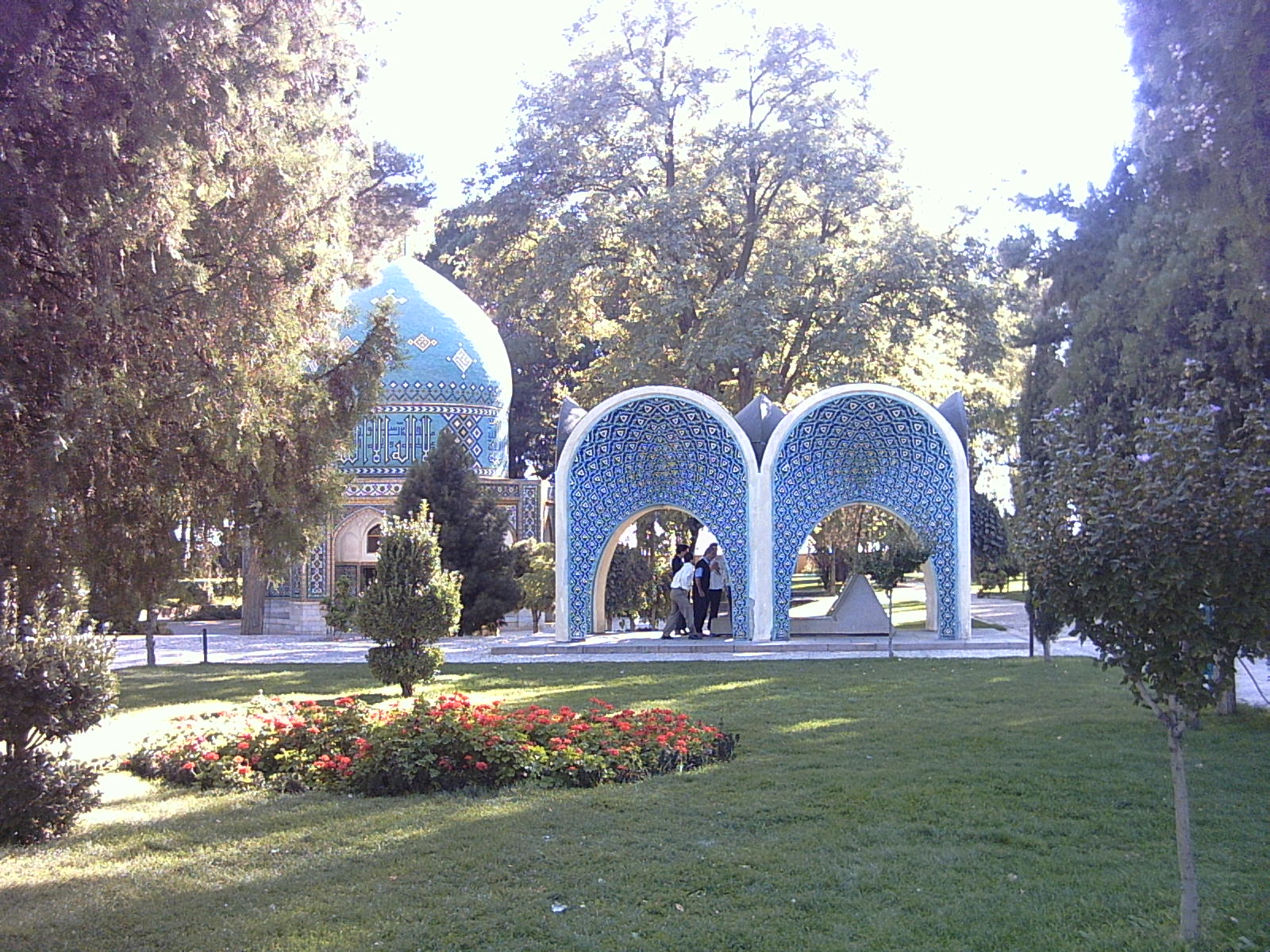
The Mausoleum of Attar of Nishapur and the Tomb of Kamal-ol-molk

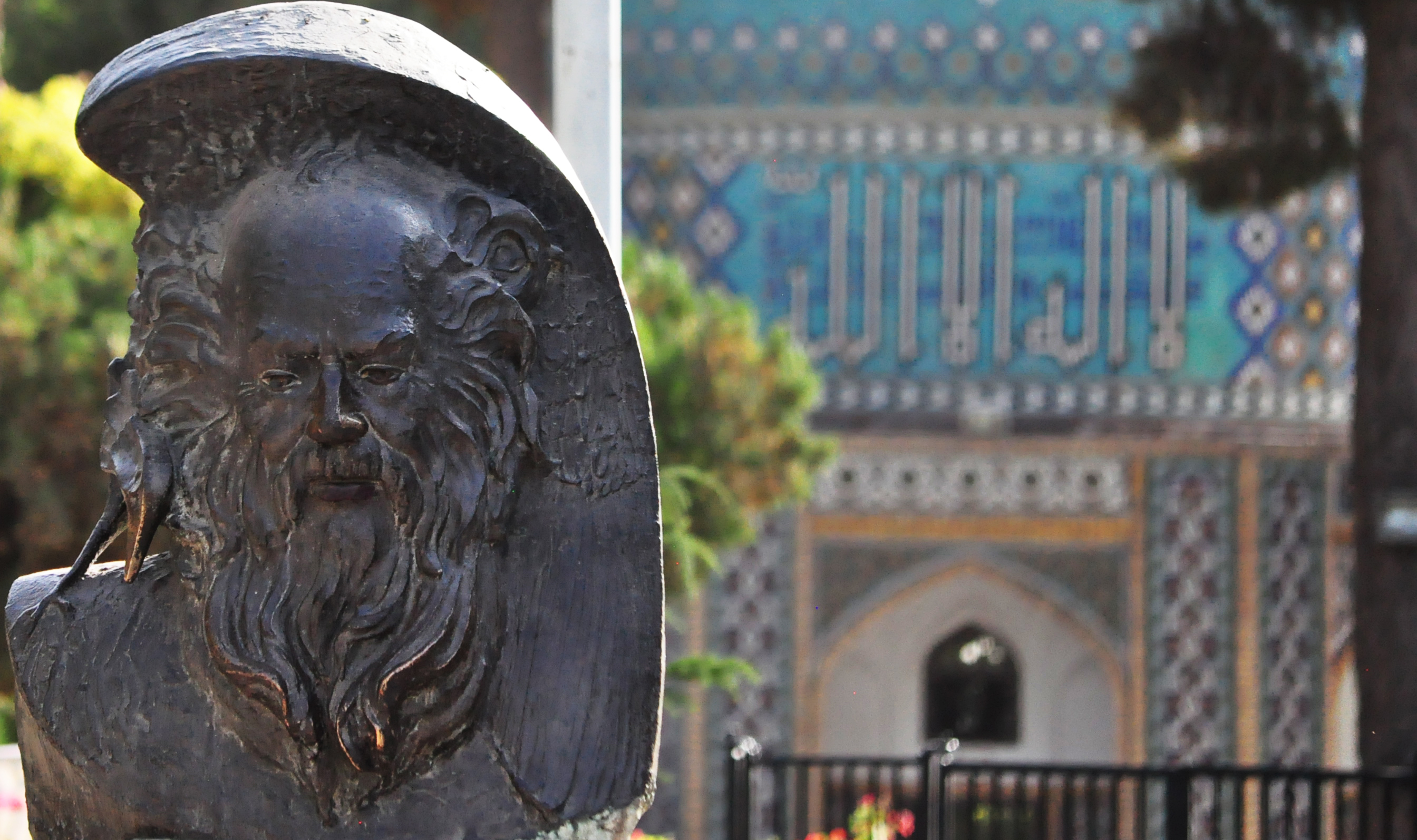
Statue of Attar, near his mausoleum

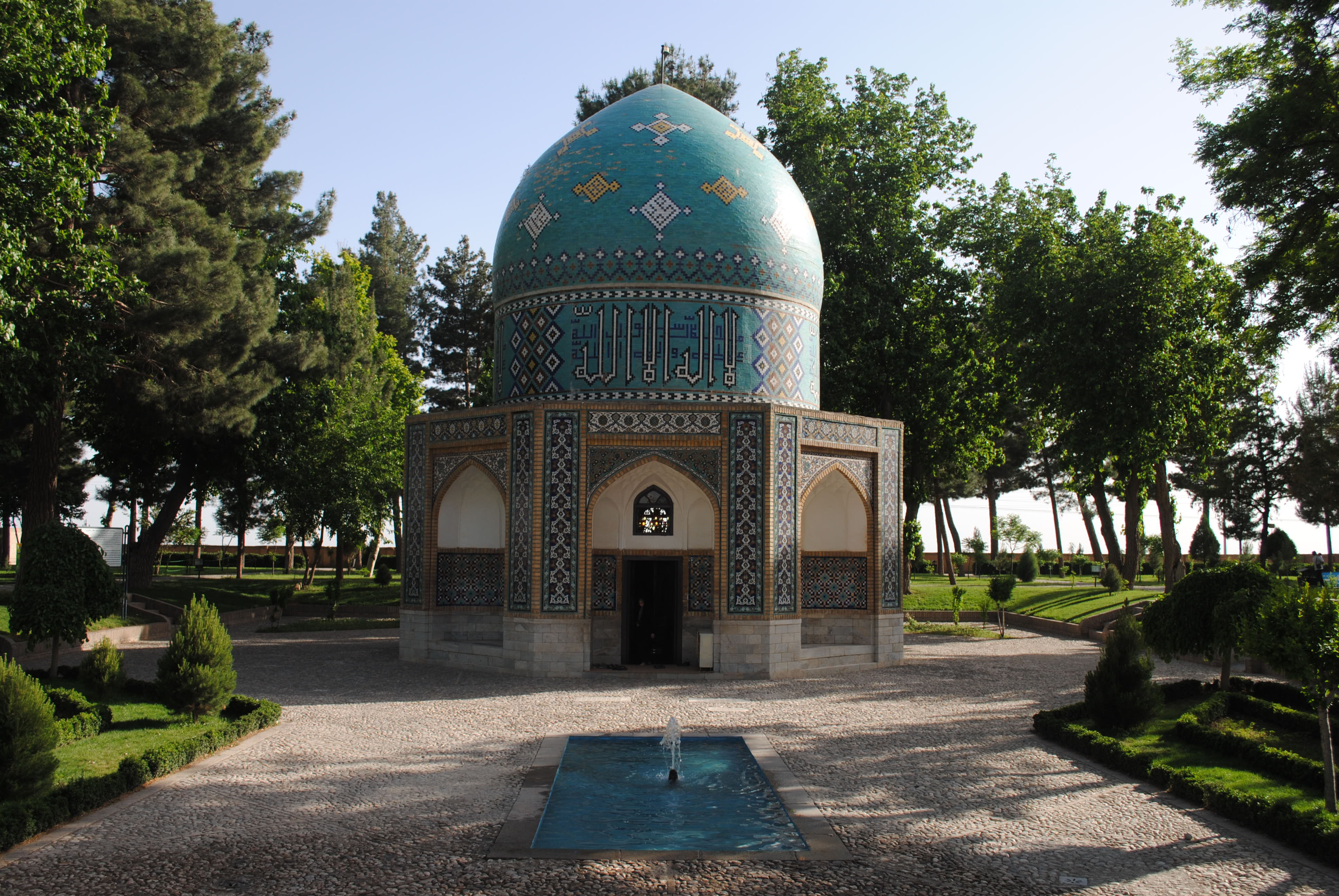
Front view of the Mausoleum of Attar

== See also ==
- List of mausoleums in Iran
- Islam in Iran
