= Marc Ghafari =

Lebanese basketball player (born 1991)

Mark Ghafari
No. 14 – Sporting Al Riyadi Beirut
- Position: Shooting guard
- League: Lebanese Basketball League

Personal information
- Born: Grosse Pointe Shores, United States
- Listed height: 1.83 m (6 ft 0 in)
- Listed weight: 80 kg (176 lb)

Career information
- Playing career: 2014–2015

Career history
- 2014–2015: Sporting Al Riyadi Beirut

Mark Ghafari (born December 10, 1991, in Grosse Pointe, MI) is a Lebanese American professional basketball player who previously played for Sporting Al Riyadi Beirut in the Lebanese Basketball League.

== Professional career ==
He started his professional career in 2014 after he played a season for Kalamazoo College in the NCAA Division 3 Tournament. Earlier in 2013, Ghafari travelled to Lebanon to perform a medical for Al Riyadi whereupon he was signed for three years.

He has since retired from professional basketball and now lives in Michigan.
