= The Doshan Tappeh Street =

Painting by Kamal-ol-molk

Doshan Tappeh Street
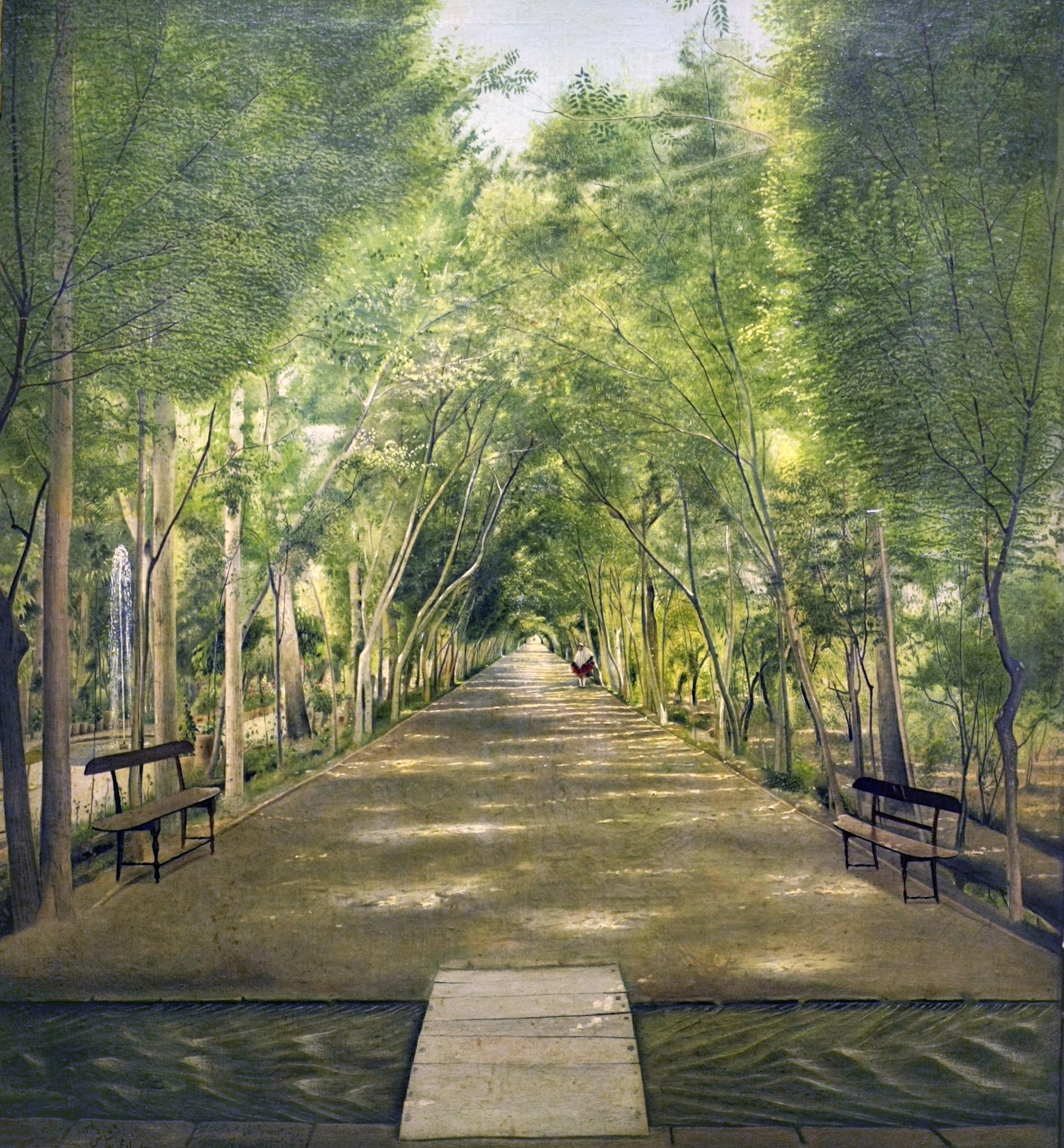
- Artist: Kamal-ol-molk
- Year: 1899
- Type: Oil on cotton duck
- Dimensions: 137 cm × 106 cm (53 7/8 in × 41 6/8 in)
- Location: Golestan Palace; Tehran

The Doshan Tappeh Street (Persian: خیابان دوشان تپه) is a painting by the Iranian realism painter Kamal-ol-molk with oil on cotton duck. It was painted in 1899 and features ex-street Doshan Tappeh in Tehran. A lady in Qajar-fashion is walking in the middle of work, along the street.

== Sources ==
- Biography and works of Kamal-ol-molk (in Persian language)
- commons.wikimedia.org commons.wikimedia
