= Saeed Reza Ghaffari =

Iranian scientist and physician (born 1962)

Dr Saeed Reza Ghaffari (Persian: دکتر سعید رضا غفاری) is an Iranian scientist and physician born in 1962, Fasa, Iran. He graduated from Tehran Medical School in 1986. He received his MSc and PhD degrees in medical Genetics from Glasgow university, UK. He is the first Iranian doctor who obtained MSc, MD and PhD in medical genetics. He has founded the Iranian Fetal Medicine Foundation (FMF Iran), Hope Generation Foundation of Iran, Center for prevention of congenital disorders and developmental delays and the "Gene Clinic". He is the founder of the Electronic Journal of Medical Genetics and current elected head of the Iranian Society of Medical Genetics. Dr Ghaffari has pioneered the Down syndrome and newborn screening programs using Tandem mass spectrometry (MS/MS) in Iran. "Iranian Genetic Core Facility" designed and established by Dr Ghaffari was opened officially in February 2010 in Imam hospital, Tehran, Iran. In November 2014, he established the first "Next Generation Sequencing" center in Iran at the "Hope Generation Foundation" which was officially opened by the Iranian health minister in January 2015.
