= Kamal-ol-molk =

Iranian painter 1848–1940

Kamal-ol-Molk
- Portrait by Antoin Sevruguin
- Born: Mohammad Ghaffari; 29 September 1848; Kashan, Sublime State of Iran
- Died: 18 August 1940 (aged 91); Nishapur, Imperial State of Iran
- Resting place: Mausoleum of Kamal-ol-Molk
- Known for: Painting
- Notable work: Mirror Hall
- Movement: Persian miniature
- Spouse: Zahra Khanoom (m. 1884; died 1919)
- Children: 2

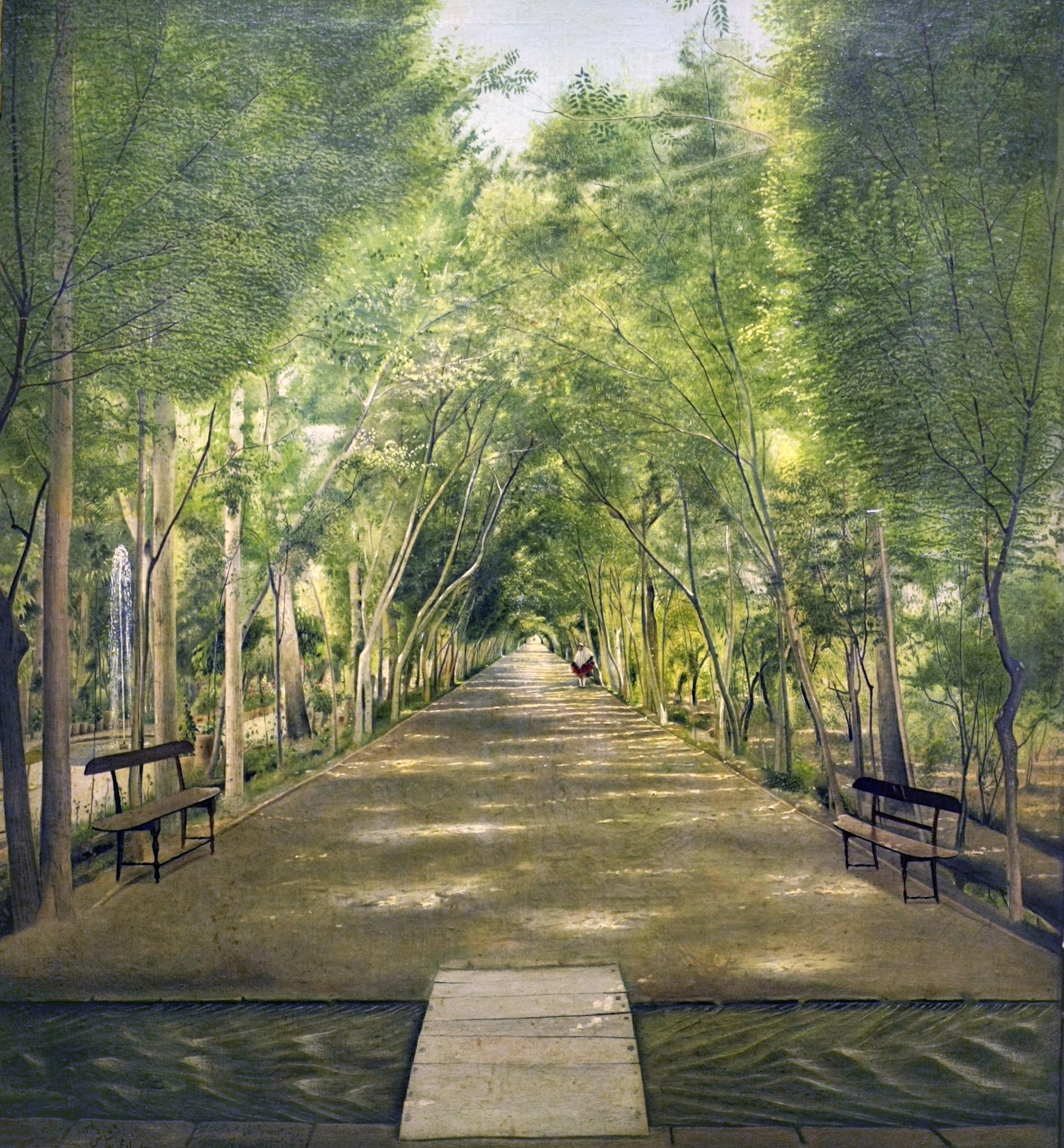
The Doshan Tappeh Street, 1899

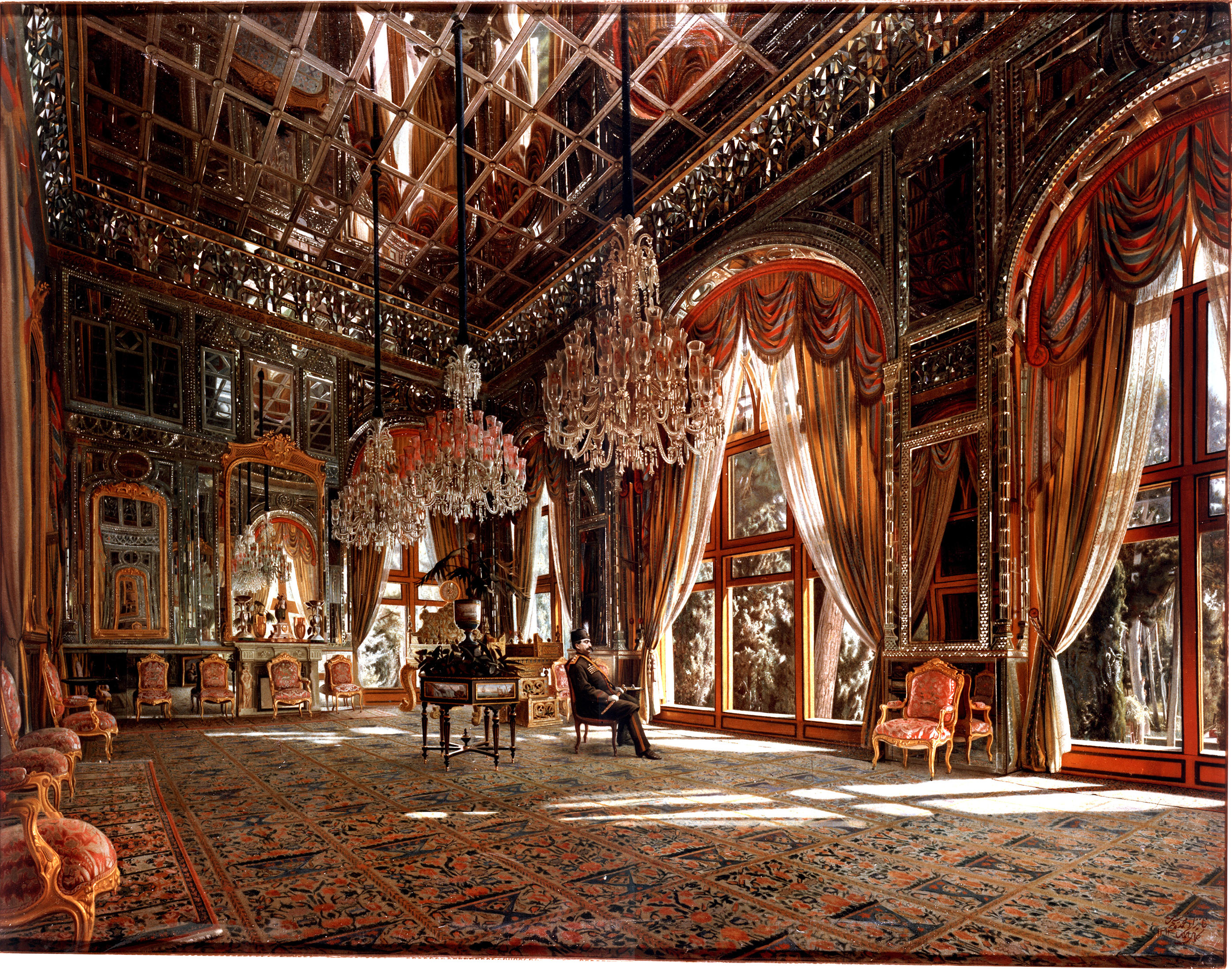
Mirror Hall, which he believed to be his best work. He painted it over a five-year period.

Mohammad Ghaffari (Persian: محمد غفاری; 29 September 1848 — 18 August 1940), better known as Kamal-ol-Molk (Persian: کمال‌المُلک, lit. 'Perfection of the Realm'), was an Iranian painter and part of the Ghaffari family in Kashan, Qajar Iran.

== Biography ==
Mohammad Ghaffari, better known as Kamal-ol-Molk, born in Kashan in 1848, to a family with a strong artistic tradition, tracing their origins back to notable painters during the reign of Nader Shah. Kamal's uncle, Abu'l-Hasan Sani al-Mulk, a celebrated 19th-century painter, was notable for his watercolor portraiture. His father, Mirza Bozorg Ghaffari Kashani, was the founder of Iran's painting school and a famous artist as well. His brother, Abu Torab Ghaffari, was also a distinguished painter of his time. Mohammad developed an interest in calligraphy and painting at a young age. In his childhood eagerness, he drew charcoal sketches on the walls of his room.

Upon completion of his primary education, Mohammad moved to Tehran. He may have studied painting for a time with Mirza Esma'il. To further his studies, he registered at the Dar-ul-Funun, a modern institute of higher learning in Persia, where he studied painting with Mozayyen-od-Doleh, a well-known painter who had visited Europe and studied Western art. He studied there for a period of three years. In his school days, the young Ghaffari was given the name Mirza Mohammad Kashi. During his education he began to attract public attention as a talented artist.

In his visits to Dar-ul-Funun, Naser al-Din Shah Qajar came to know Mohammad Ghaffari and invited him to the court. Mohammad further improved his technique, and Nasereddin Shah gave him the title "Kamal-ol-Molk" (Perfection on Land).

During the years he stayed at Naser ed-Din Shah's court, Kamal-ol-Molk created some of his most significant works. The paintings he did in this period, which lasted up until the assassination of Nasereddin Shah, were portraits of important people, landscapes, paintings of royal camps and hunting grounds, and various parts of royal palaces.

In this busiest period of Kamal-ol-Molk's artistic life, he created over 170 paintings. However, most of these paintings have either been destroyed or taken abroad. The works he created in this period indicate his desire to develop his oil painting technique. He advanced so much that he even acquired laws of perspective by himself and applied them to his works. His mastery in the delicate use of a brush was as well as bright and lively colors distinguished him from his contemporaries.

== Visit to Europe ==
Following Naser al-Din Shah Qajar's death, Kamal-ol-Molk found it impossible to work under his son, Mozaffar ad-Din Shah Qajar. Therefore, he set out for Europe in 1898, at the age of 47 to improve his art. Once there, he had discussions with distinguished European artists on style and technique, and copied some of Rembrandt's works, including "Self Portrait", "Jonah", and "Saint Matthew". Kamal-ol-Molk visited most of Europe's museums and closely studied the works of some well-known artists such as Raphael, Titian, and adapted and altered some of their works. He stayed in Europe for about four years. In 1902, he returned to Iran, after which he became court painter to five shahs.

== Migration to Iraq ==
The increasing pressure on Kamal-ol-Molk, originating in Mozaffar ad-Din Shah Qajar's court, left him no option but to leave his country for Iraq, in spite of all the affection he felt for Iran. The visits he made to the holy cities in Iraq inspired his work at this time. "Karbala-ye-Moalla Square", and "Baghdad Jewish Fortune Tellers" are two of his most magnificent works of this period.

With the advent of the Constitutional Movement, after a two-year stay in Iraq, Kamal-ol-Molk returned to Iran and joined the Constitutionalists because of the hatred he had developed towards Mazaffareddin Shah's government. Portraits like "Commander Asa'd Bakhtiari" and "Azad-ol-Molk" signify this period.

== Kamal-ol-Molk Art School ==
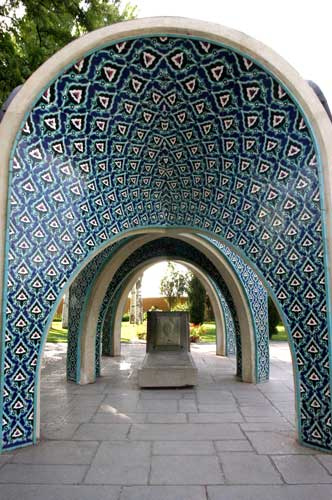
Mausoleum of Kamal-ol-Molk, Nishapur.

The post-Constitutional Movement era of Iran brought about a new atmosphere for the artist. The Constitutionalists were cultured and appreciated art more than did their predecessors, thus respect for Kamal-ol-Molk and his works increased.

The master established Sanaye Mostazrafeh Art School, better known as Kamal-ol-Molk Art School, pursued his artistic career and steadied a new style in Iranian art. The School's goal was to find new talents, embrace them and educate them in the best possible way. Kamal-ol-Molk did not confine himself to painting. Rather, he introduced other arts and crafts such as carpet weaving, mosaic designing, and woodwork to his school in order to revive the dying fine arts. In addition to teaching art, through his kind behavior he also taught students love, morals and humanity. Many a time he stayed late at school, teaching. He even allotted a portion of his monthly payment to poor students.

== Death ==
Mausoleum of Kamal-ol-Molk in Nishapur, Iran, in 1940. His mourners, especially family and closely related friends, marched his body next to the tomb of Sufi poet, Attar.

== Gallery ==
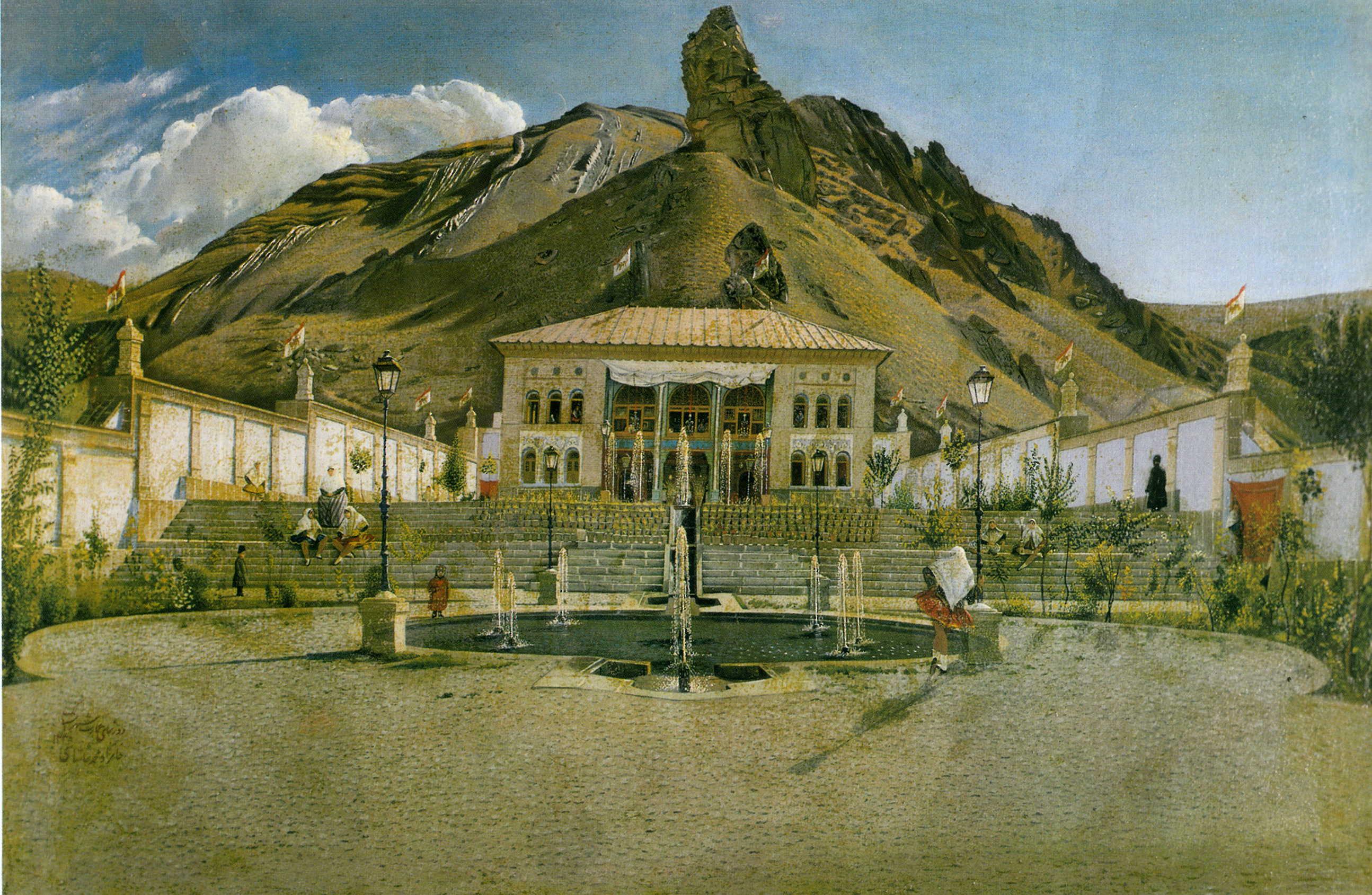
Shahrestanak Palace, 1887

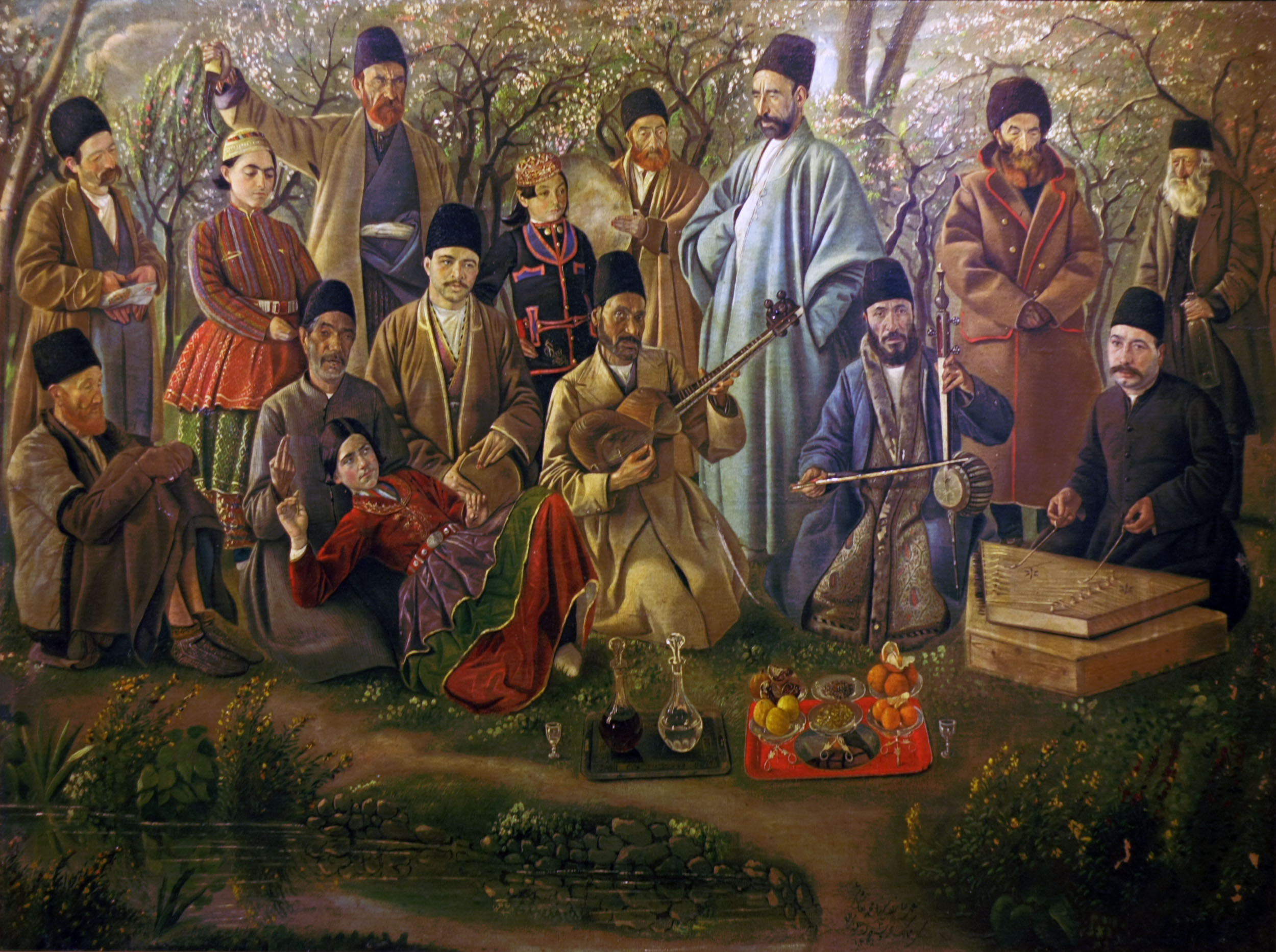
A group of musicians, 1886

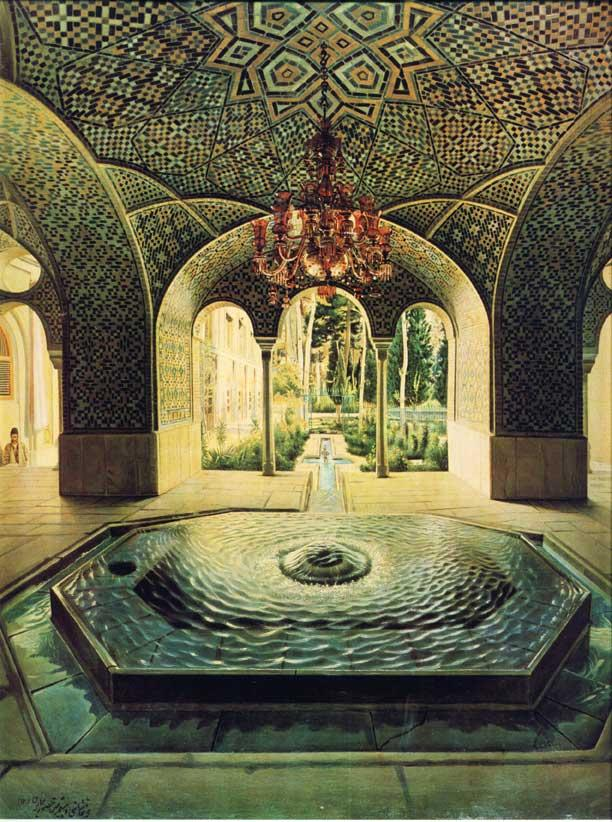
The spring hall of Golestan Palace, 1889

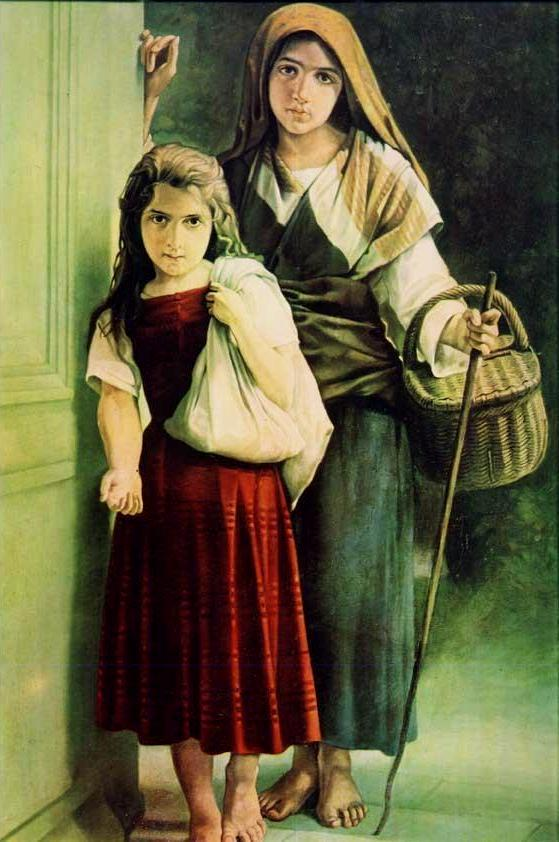
Beggar Girls, painting by Kamal-ol-molk in 1889

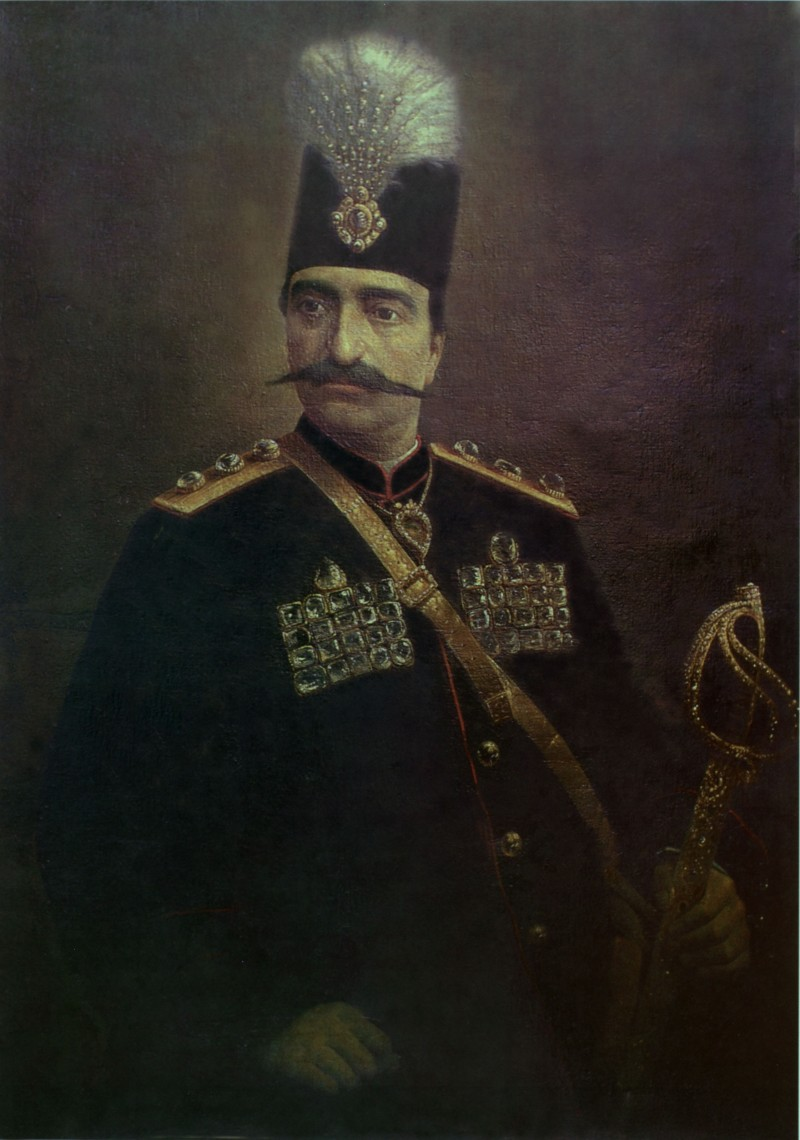
Portrait of Naser al-Din Shah Qajar, 1889/90

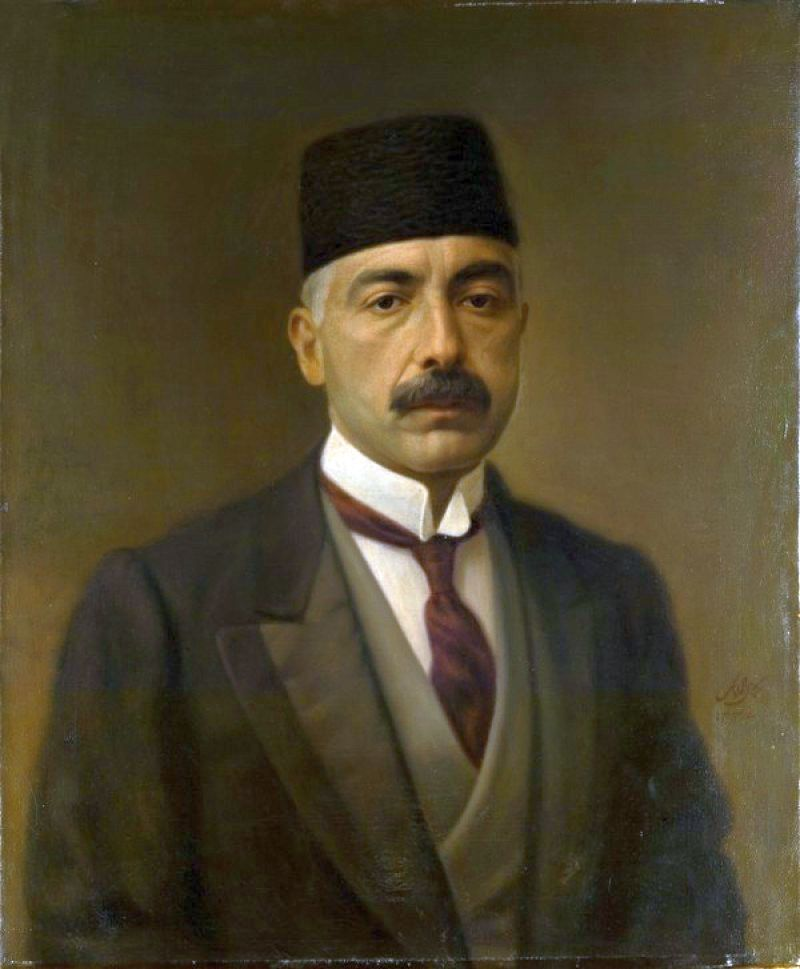
Portrait of Vosugh od-Dowleh, 1900–17

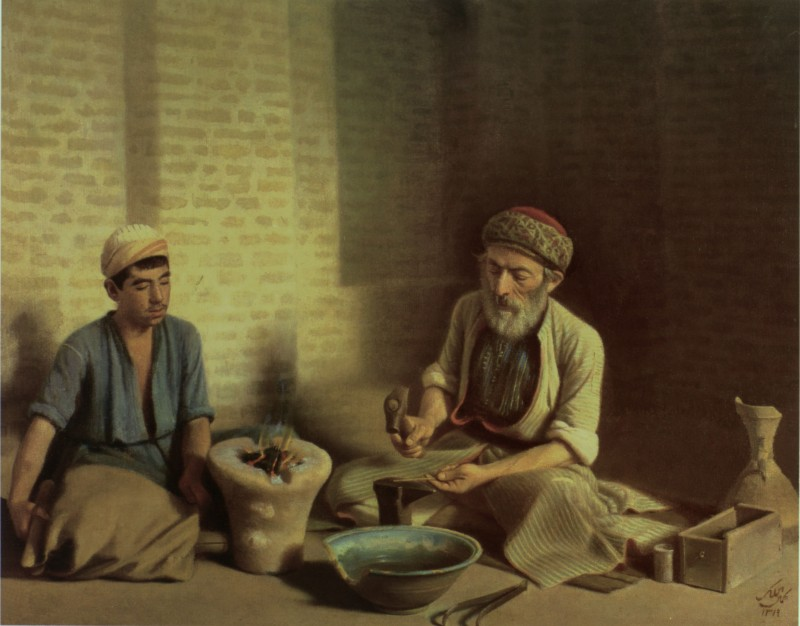
The Baghdadi goldsmith, 1901

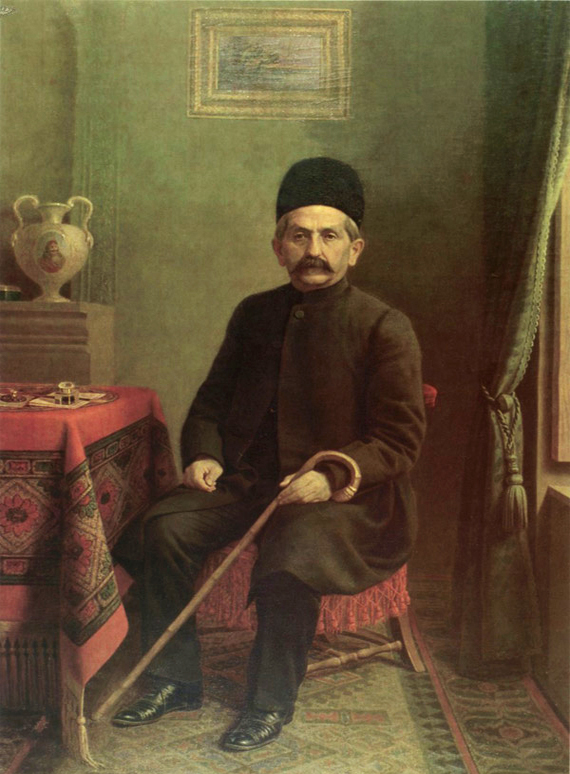
Portrait of Ali-Qoli Khan Bakhtiari, 1910

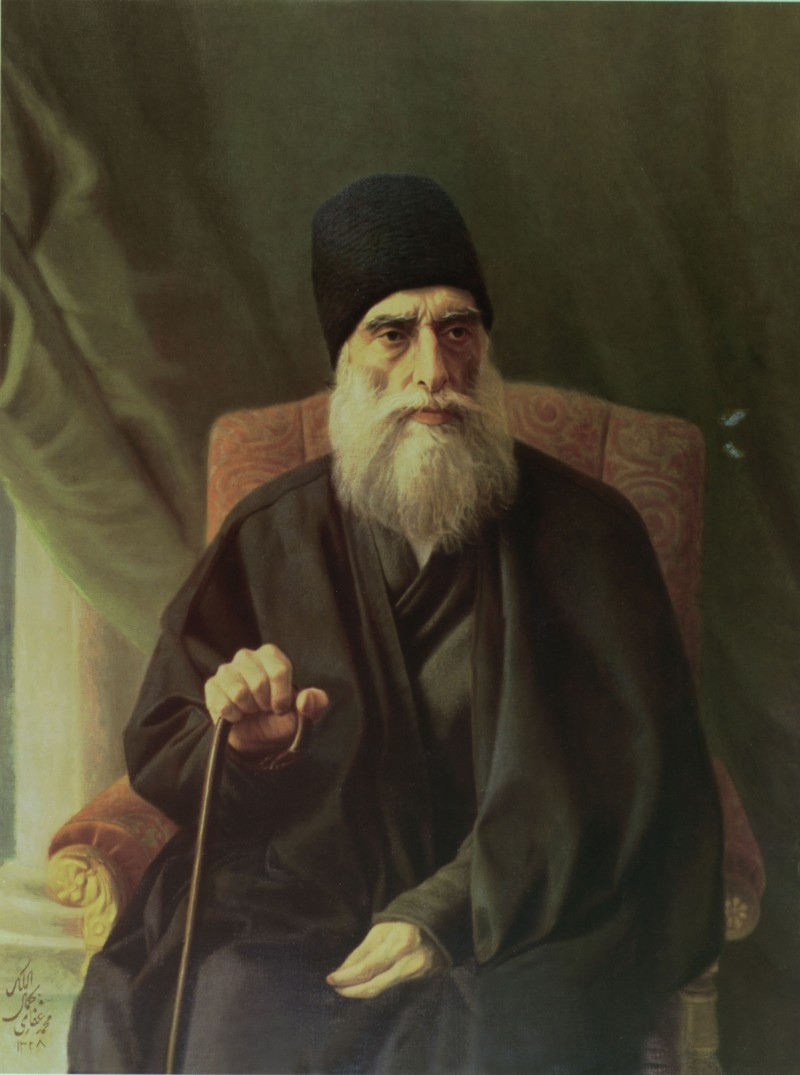
The Azod-ol-Molk, 1910

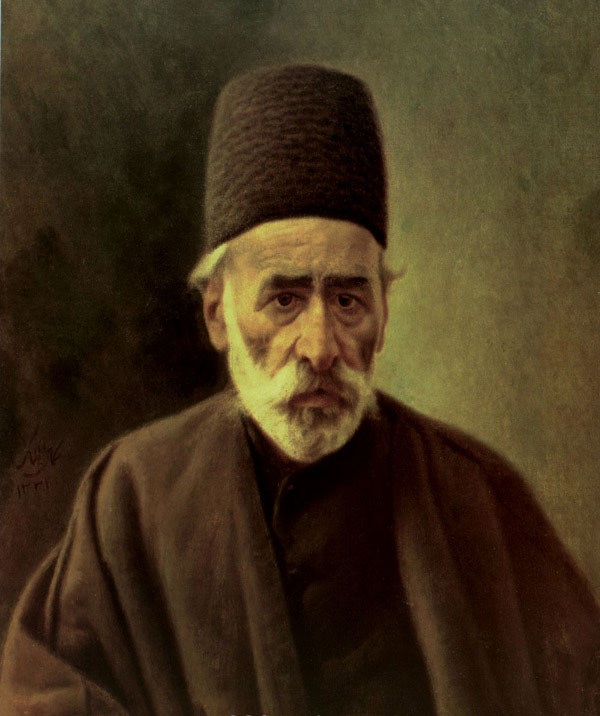
The Zoka-ol-Molk I, 1913

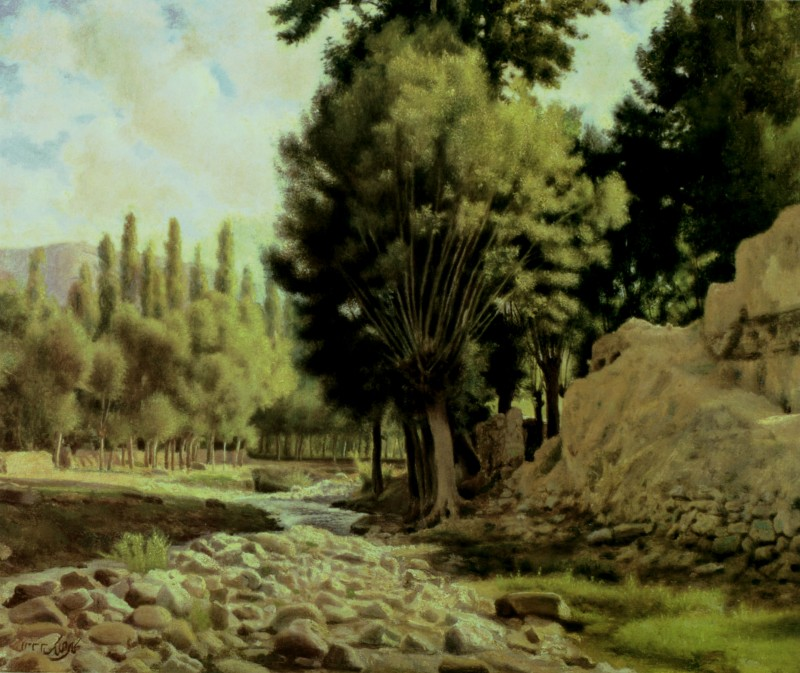
The Damavand Village, 1915

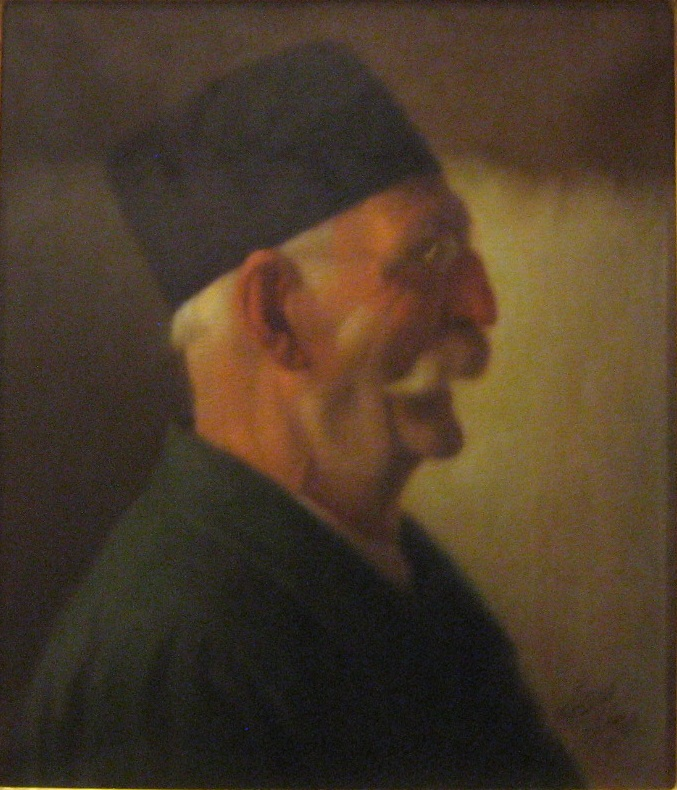
The Kamal-ol-molk profile portrait, 1925

== See also ==
- Iranian art
- Islamic art
- Islamic calligraphy
- List of Iranian artists
