= Mausoleum of Omar Khayyám =

Mausoleum in Nishapur, Iran

- آرامگاه عمر خیام
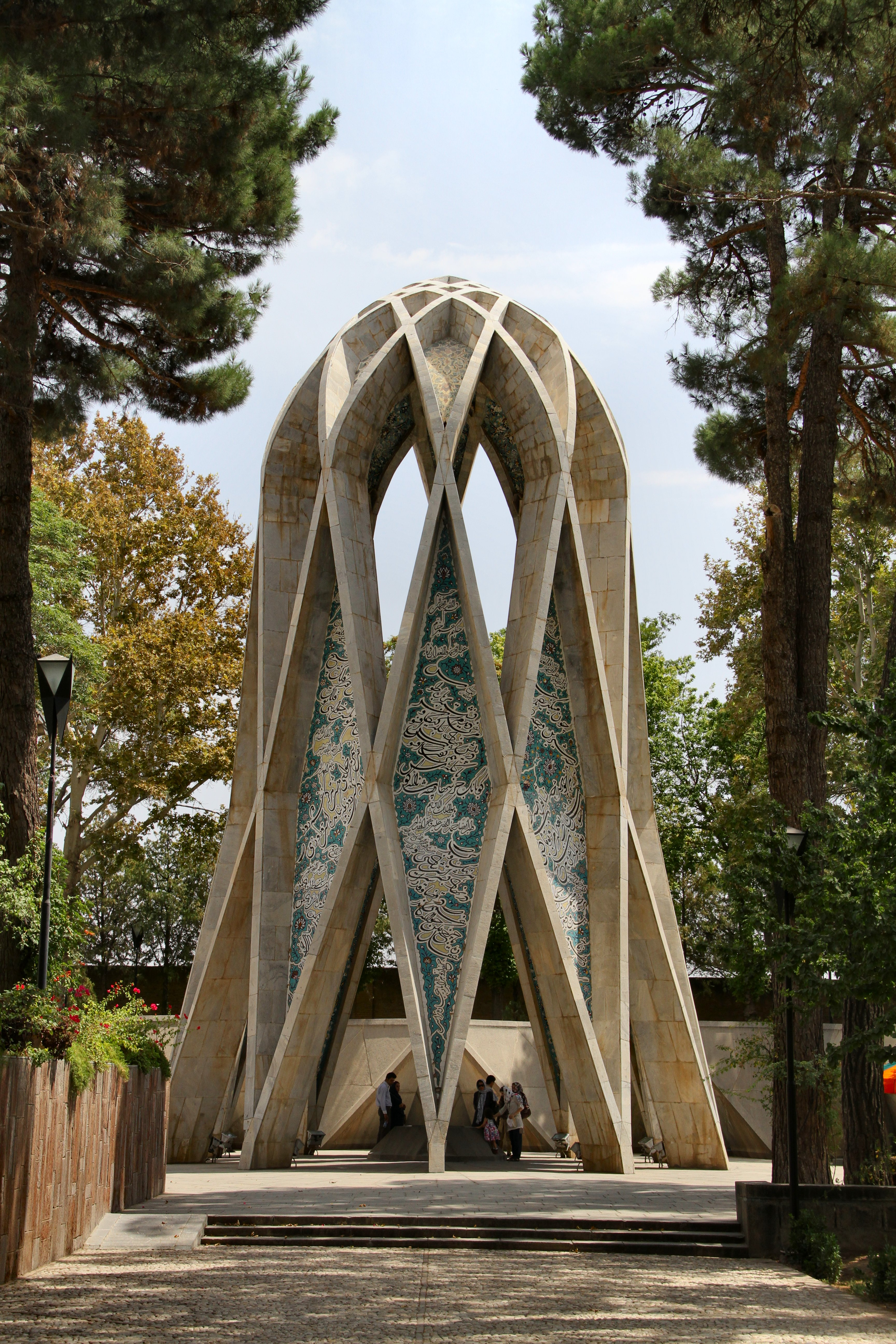
- The mausoleum in 2011

- Location of the structure in Iran

Religion
- Ecclesiastical or organizational status: Mausoleum
- Known for: Symbol of the city of Nishapur

Location
- Location: Erfan St, Khayyam Blvd, Nishapur, Razavi Khorasan province
- Country: Iran
- Interactive map of Mausoleum of Omar Khayyám
- Coordinates: 36°09′57″N 58°49′20″E

Architecture
- Architect: Hooshang Seyhoun
- Type: Iranian architecture
- Style: Contemporary Iranian
- Founder: Reza Shah (reconstruction)
- Groundbreaking: 1934 (reconstruction)
- Completed: 1963 (reconstruction)

Specifications
- Height (max): 22 m (72 ft)
- Shrine: One: Omar Khayyám
- Materials: White marble

Iran National Heritage List
- Official name: Mausoleum of Omar Khayyam
- Type: Built
- Designated: 9 December 1975
- Reference no.: 1165
- Conservation organization: Cultural Heritage, Handicrafts and Tourism Organization of Iran

The Mausoleum of Omar Khayyám (Persian: آرامگاه عمر خیام); is a mausoleum of white marble erected over Omar Khayyám's headstone, located on the south-east of the city of Nishapur, in the northeastern province of Razavi Khorasan, Iran. The mausoleum is a symbol of contemporary Iranian architecture. Commissioned by Reza Shah, designed by Hooshang Seyhoun, and completed in 1963, during the Pahlavi era, the structure was added to the Iran National Heritage List on 9 December 1975, administered by the Cultural Heritage, Handicrafts and Tourism Organization of Iran.

The design of the mausoleum has become one of the main symbols of the city and a known work of contemporary Iranian architecture, visible on the coat of arms of the University of Neyshabur, Neyshabur University of Medical Sciences (NUMS), and other public, civil and private organizations of the city.

== History ==
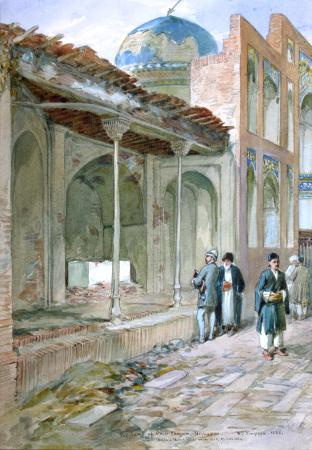
The Tomb of Omar Khayyam in 1886 depicted by William Simpson. Prior to the construction of the monument, it can be seen next to the mosque which it adjoins.

Omar Khayyam died on 4 December 1131 CE. The earliest account of Omar's final resting place is provided by his pupil Nizami Aruzi who visited his tomb in 1135-6. In Balkh, in 1112-13, Nizami heard Omar make a prophecy about his place of burial, that his grave "would be where flowers in the springtime would shed their petals over his dust". He describes visiting his grave in what was then the cemetery of Hayrah:

… [his prophecy] seemed to me impossible, though I knew that one such as he would not speak idle words. When I arrived at Nishapur in the year A.H. 530, it being then four years since that great man had veiled his countenance in the dust, and this nether world had been bereaved of him. Since he was my master, on the eve of a Friday, with a companion, I went to visit his grave in the Hayrah Cemetery, I turned left and saw a grave situated at the foot of a garden-wall, over which pear-trees and peach-trees thrust their heads, and on his grave had fallen so many flower-leaves that his dust was hidden beneath the flowers. This reminded me of the conversation I had heard from him in the city of Balkh, I wept, for in the four corners of the world I had seen no one like him.

The tomb itself survived various calamities; including several major earthquakes, raids by some Turkic tribes, and the Mongol invasion. In the succeeding centuries, Omar's grave had become situated in an open wing of a shrine of a certain Islamic saint called Imamzadeh Muhammad Mahruk (d. eighth century), the brother of Reza. According to Percy Sykes, who visited the poet's tomb twice, the saint's mortuary shrine contained a formal Persian garden with cobbled paths. The shrine had a turquoise dome and was likely erected in the seventeenth century, or possibly earlier by Shah Abbas. Some pilgrims to Omar's grave, such as the Iranologist, A. V. Williams Jackson who visited it in 1911, described his tomb as a simple case made of brick and cement with no inscription.

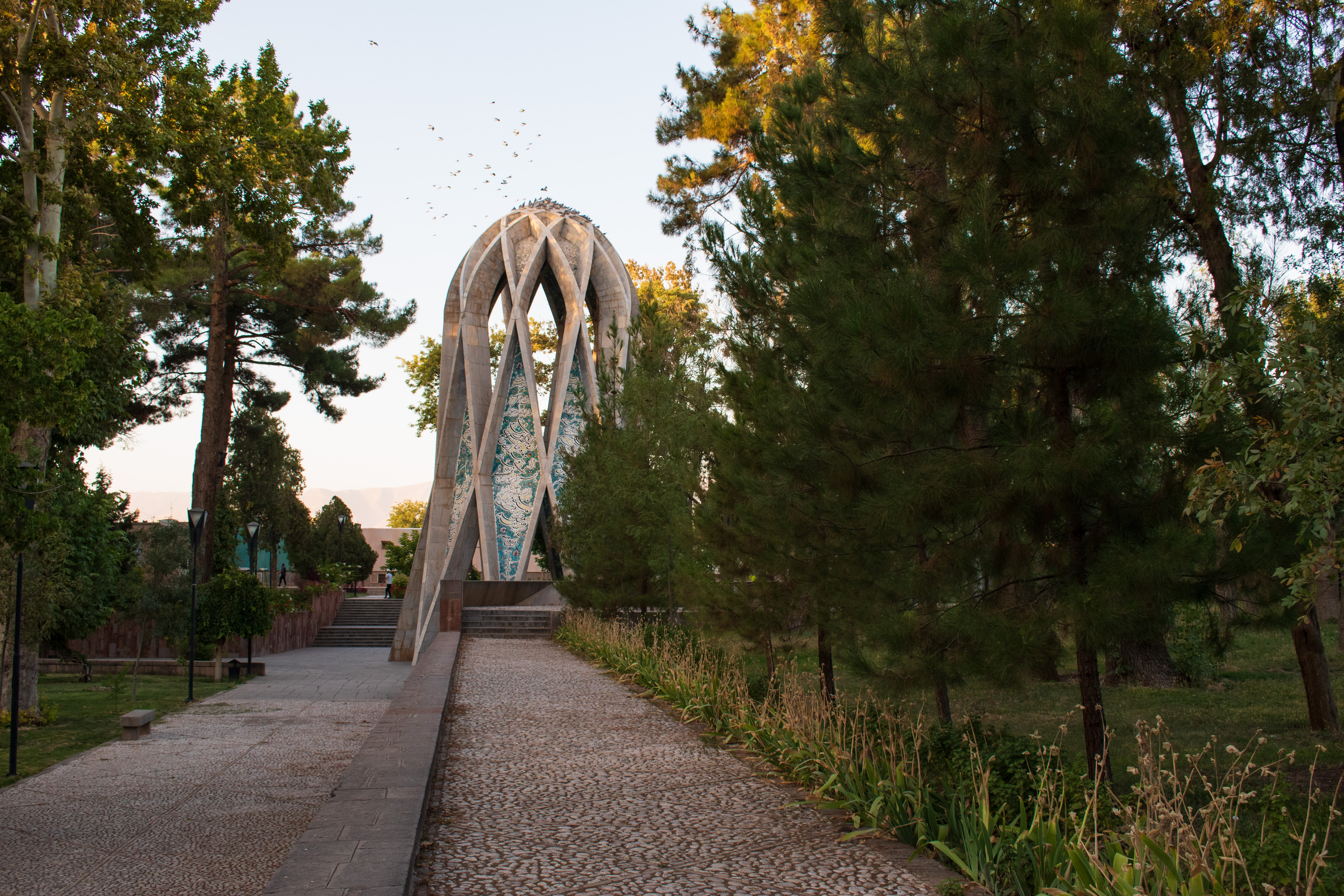
Mausoleum of Omar Khayyám in 2020

=== Reconstruction ===
The reconstruction of the mausoleum was commissioned by the Iranian government under Reza Shah in 1934 during Ferdowsi's millenary. Omar's tomb was separated from the shrine, and a white marble monument, designed by Hooshang Seyhoun, was erected over it. The construction was completed in 1963. Seyhoun combined Khayyam's talents as a poet, mathematician, and astronomer in his design. Nizami Aruzi mentioned Khayyam's desire for a grave adorned with blossoms each spring. Seyhoun fulfilled this wish by creating a pathway from the garden to Khayyam's tomb, allowing flowers to fall on it annually. He also paid homage to Khayyam's geometric work with a star-shaped feature on the tomb, opening to the sky above Nishapur and symbolizing the celestial expanse. To further honour Khayyam, Seyhoun decorated the structure with tiles inscribed with Khayyam poems in beautiful calligraphy, featuring Morteza Abdolrasul's abstract Shekaste Nastalik. This project aimed to modernize Iranian architecture while still embracing its heritage, marking a distinct Iranian modernism.

== Gallery ==
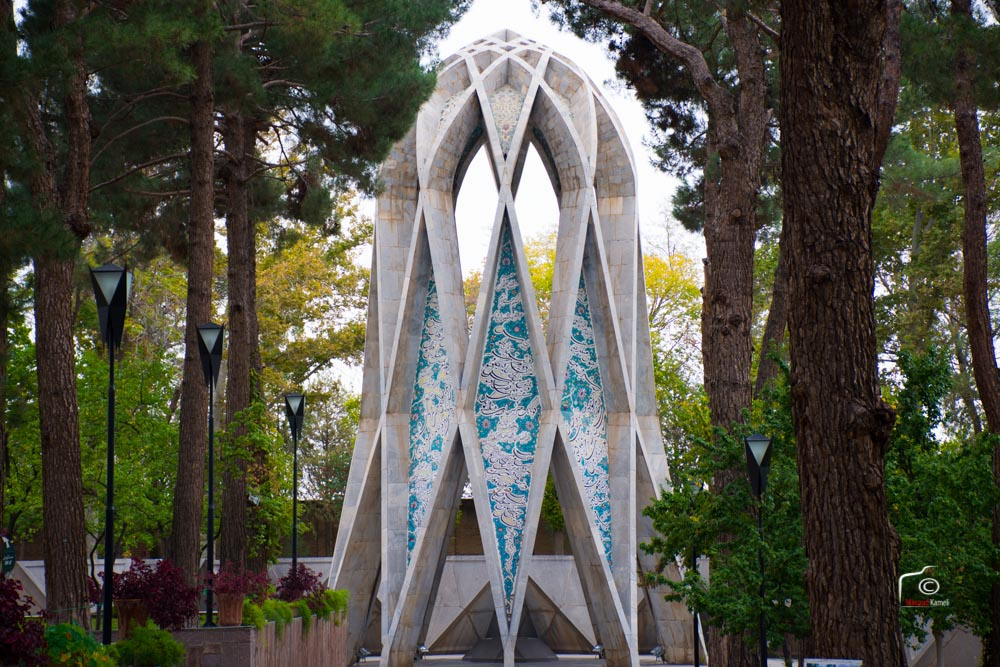

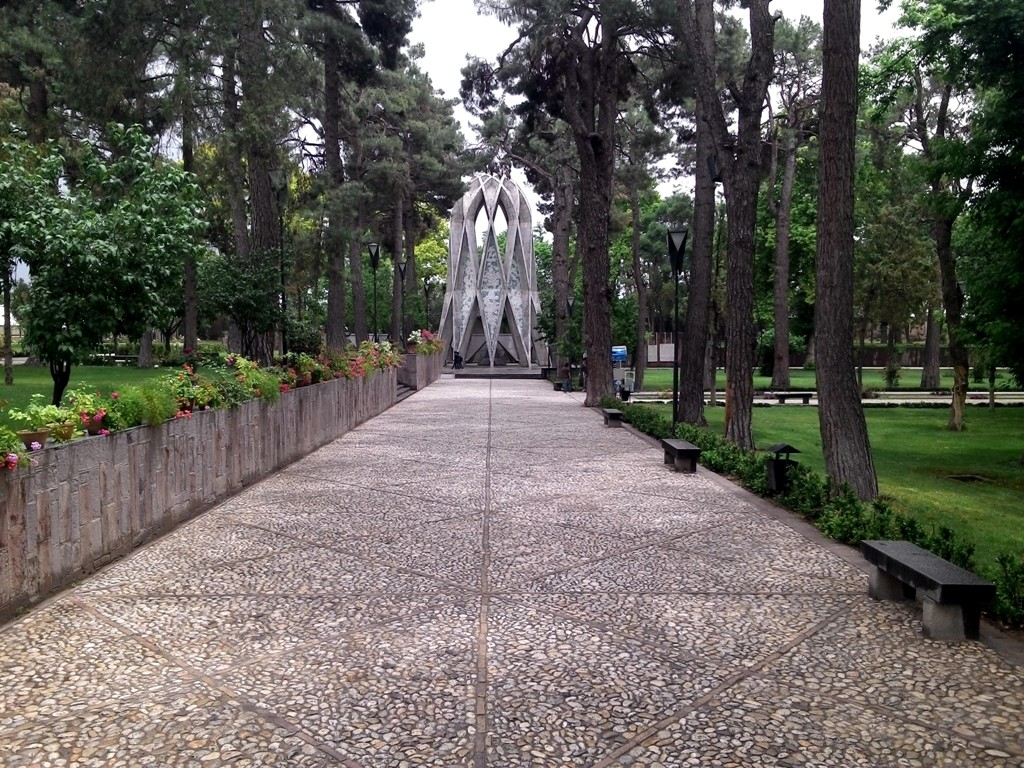

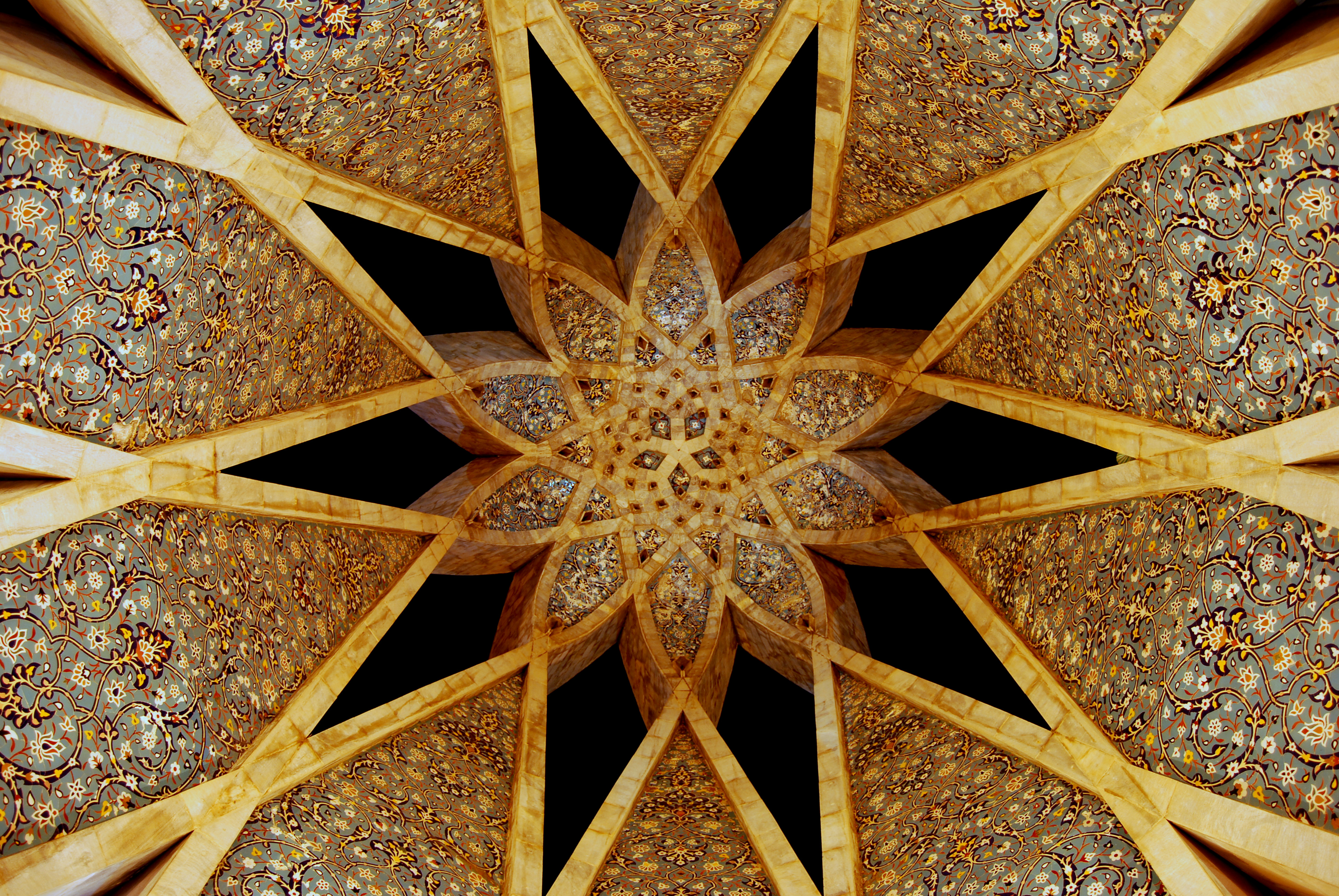

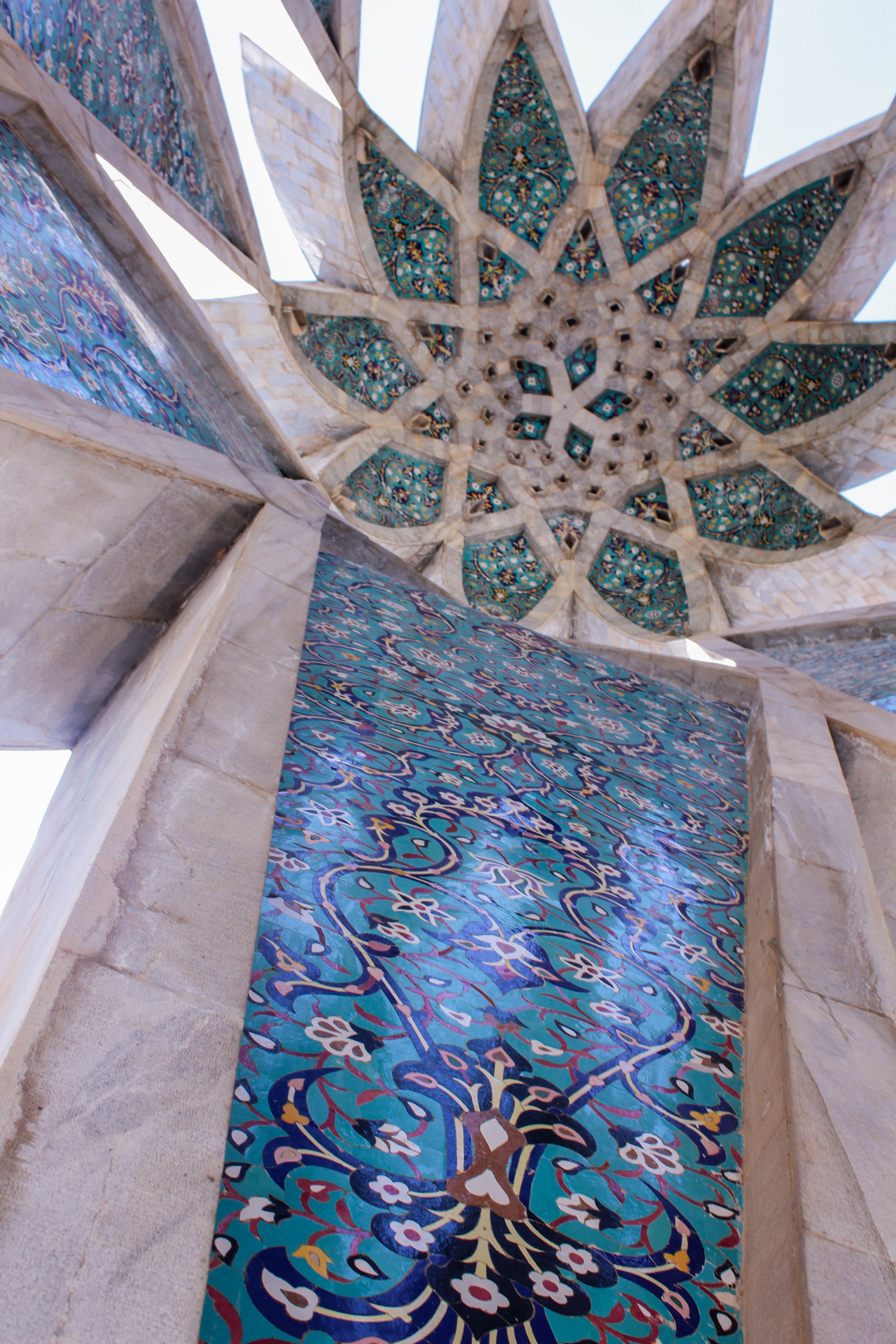

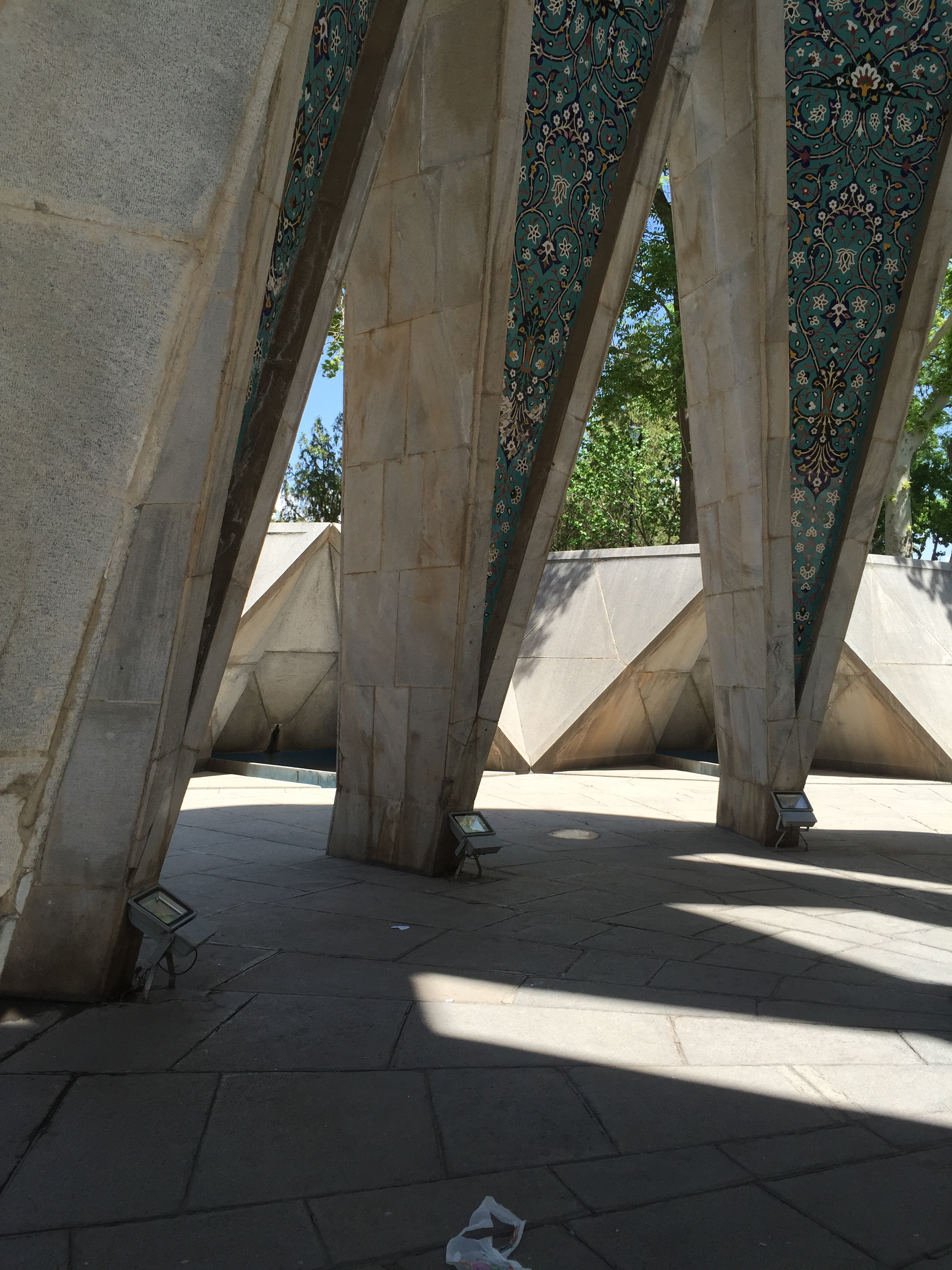

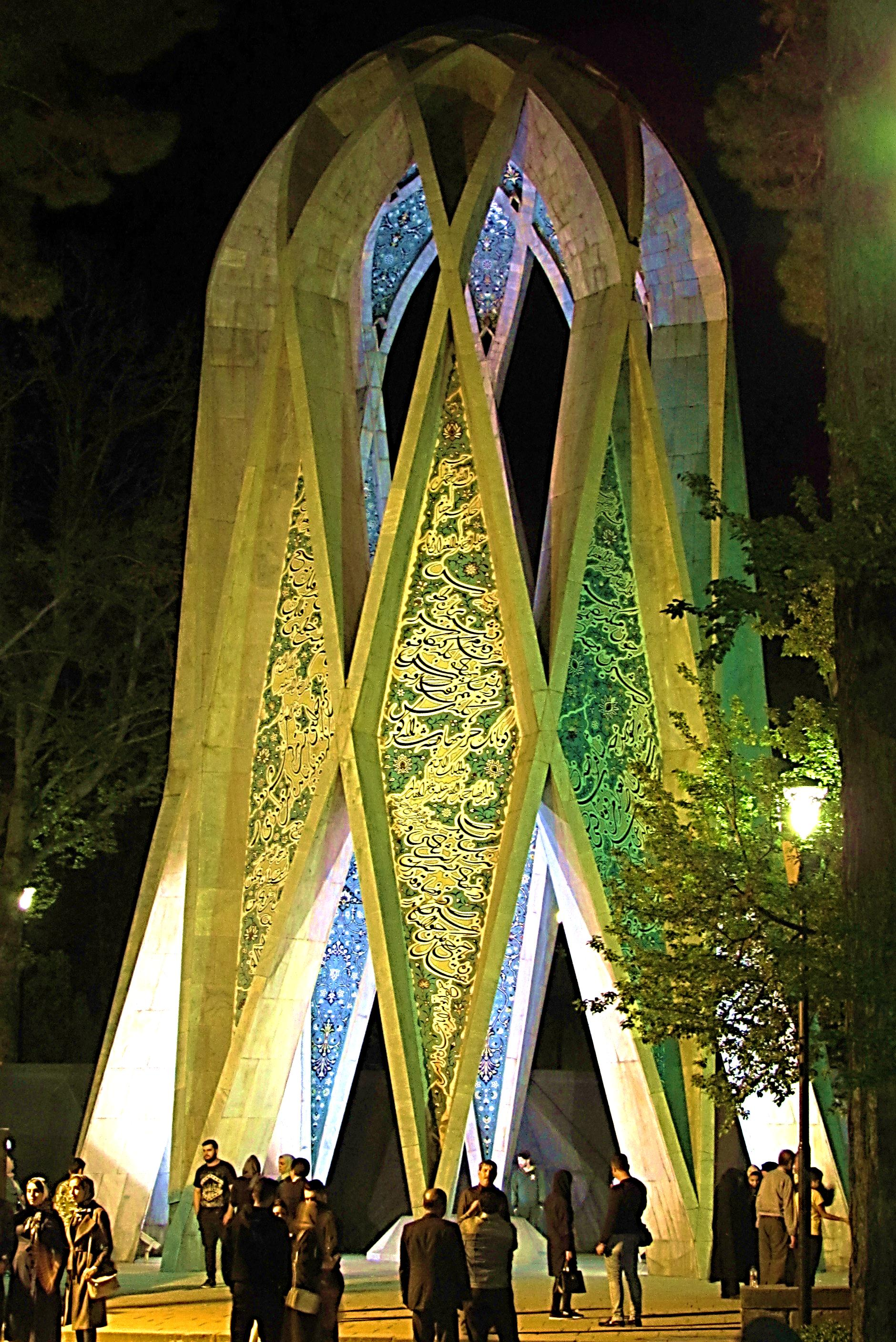
Some verses of Khayyam have been written on his mausoleum with the taliq script

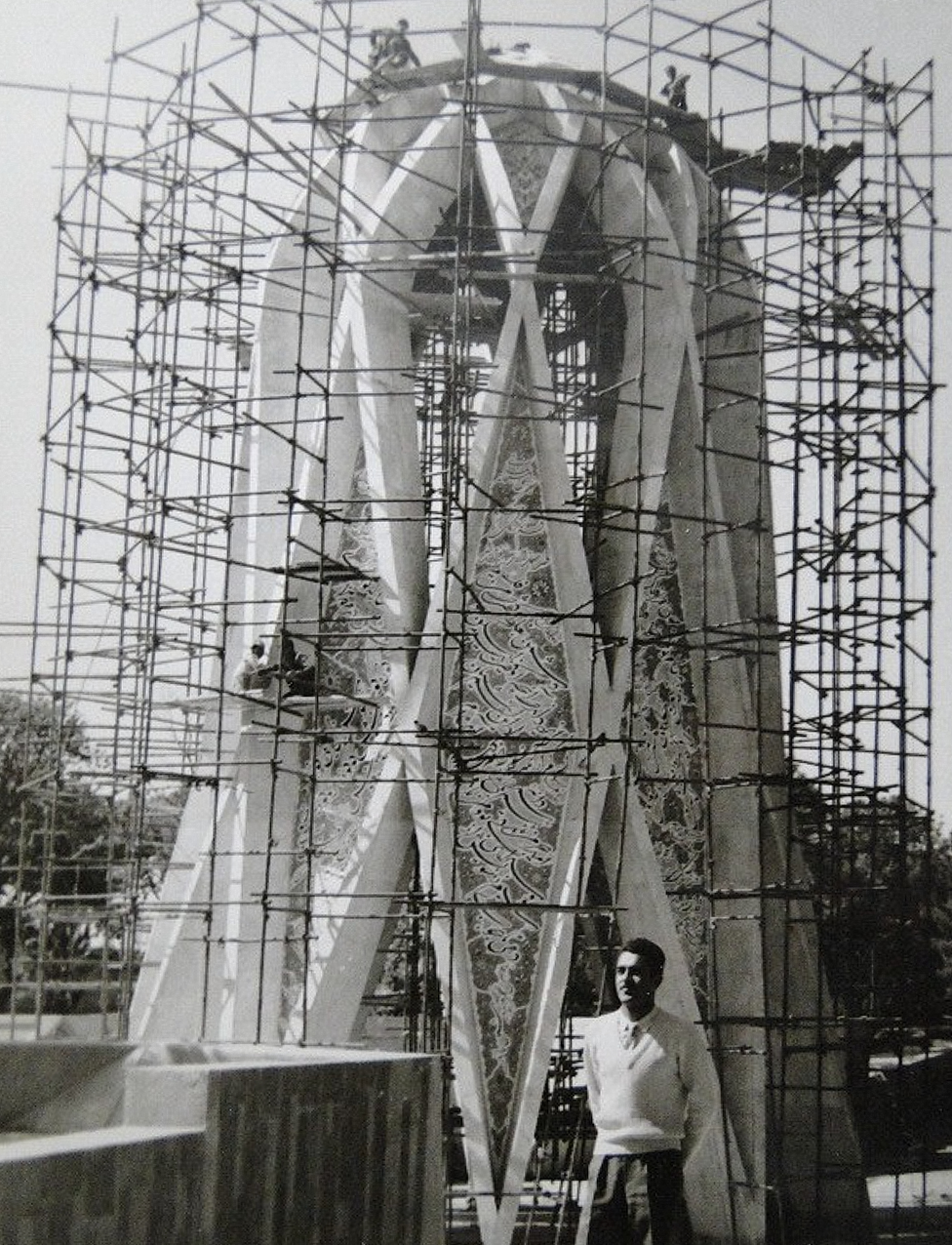

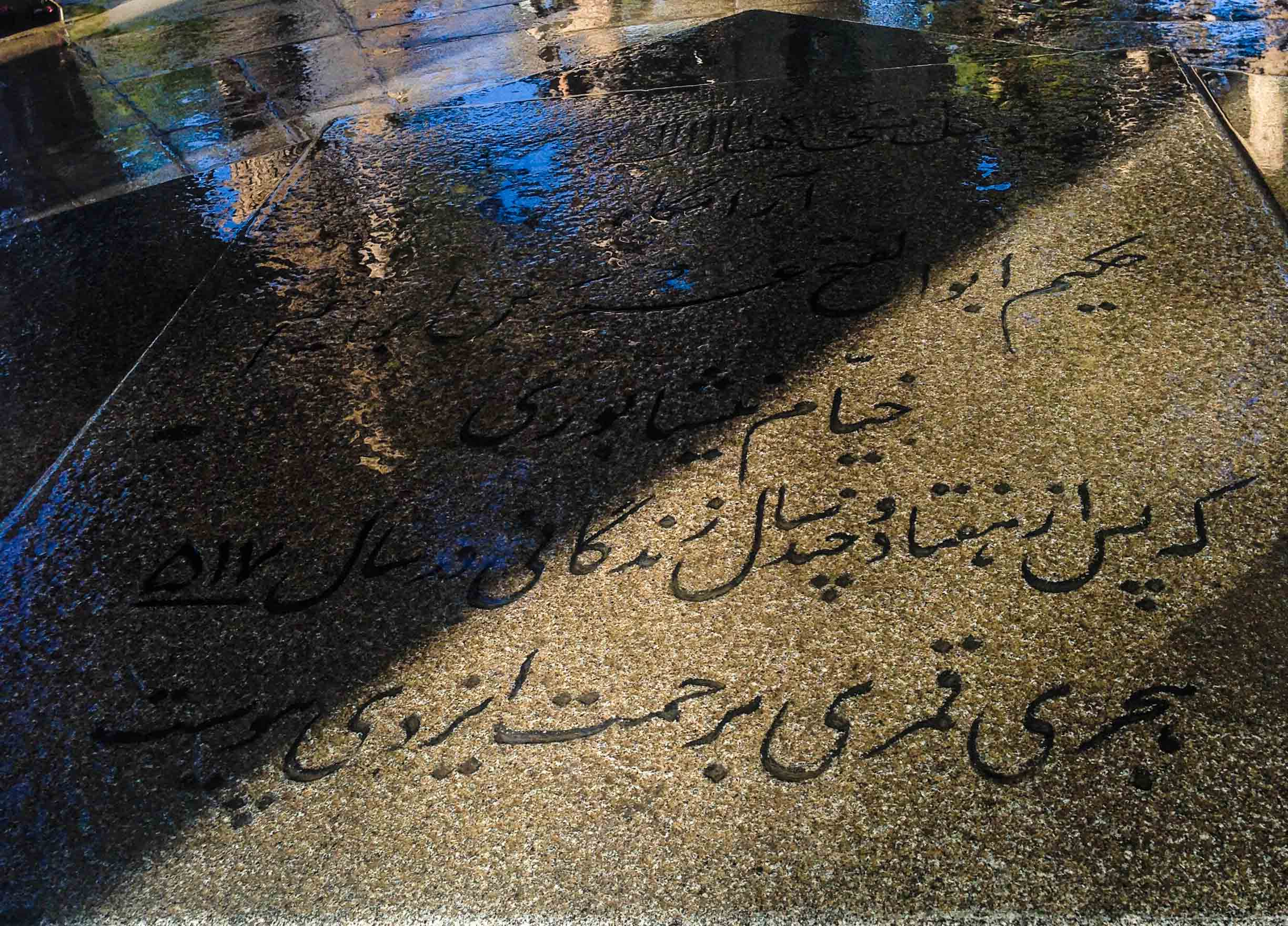

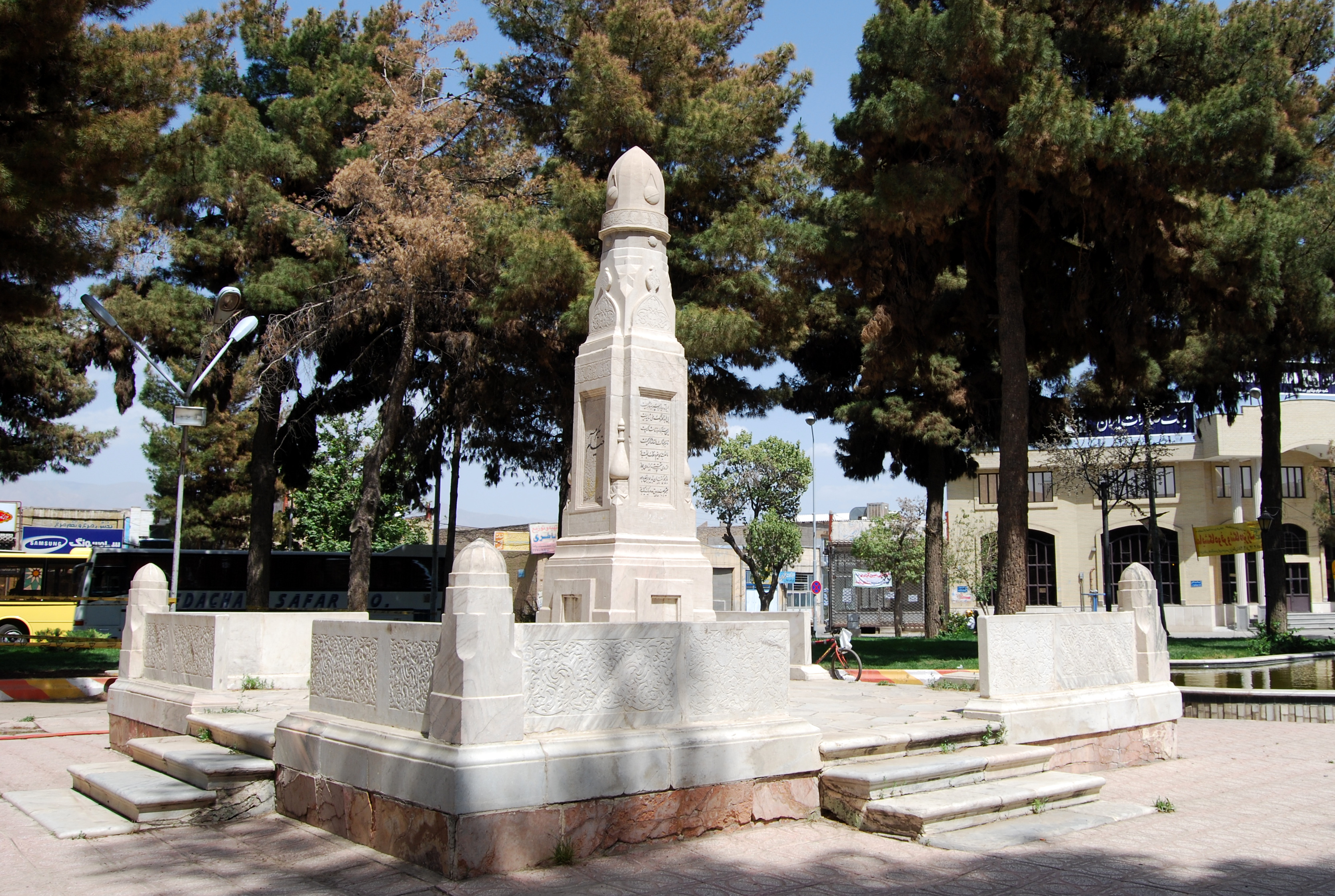
Previous tomb of Khayyam, situated in the Khayyam square

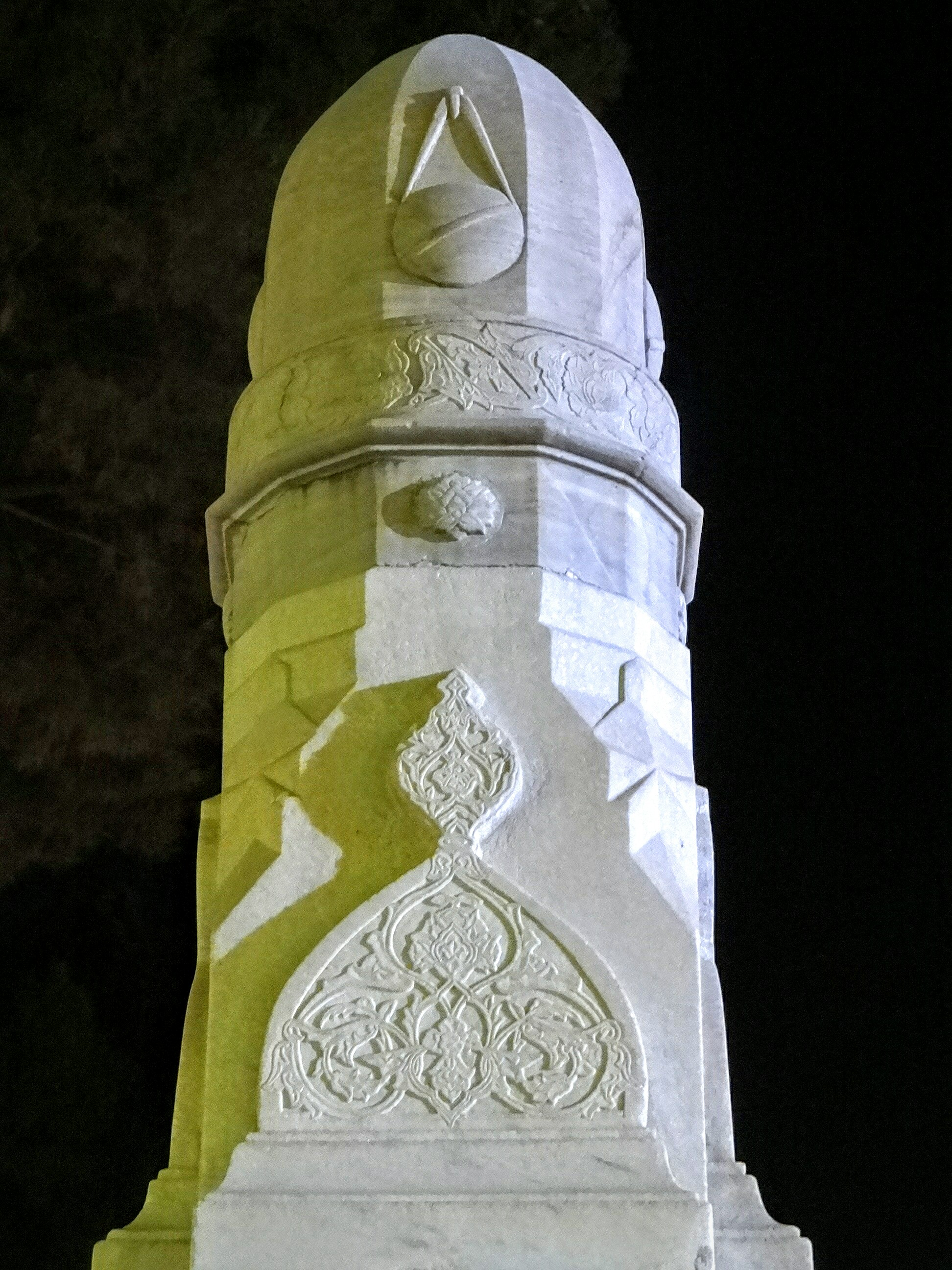

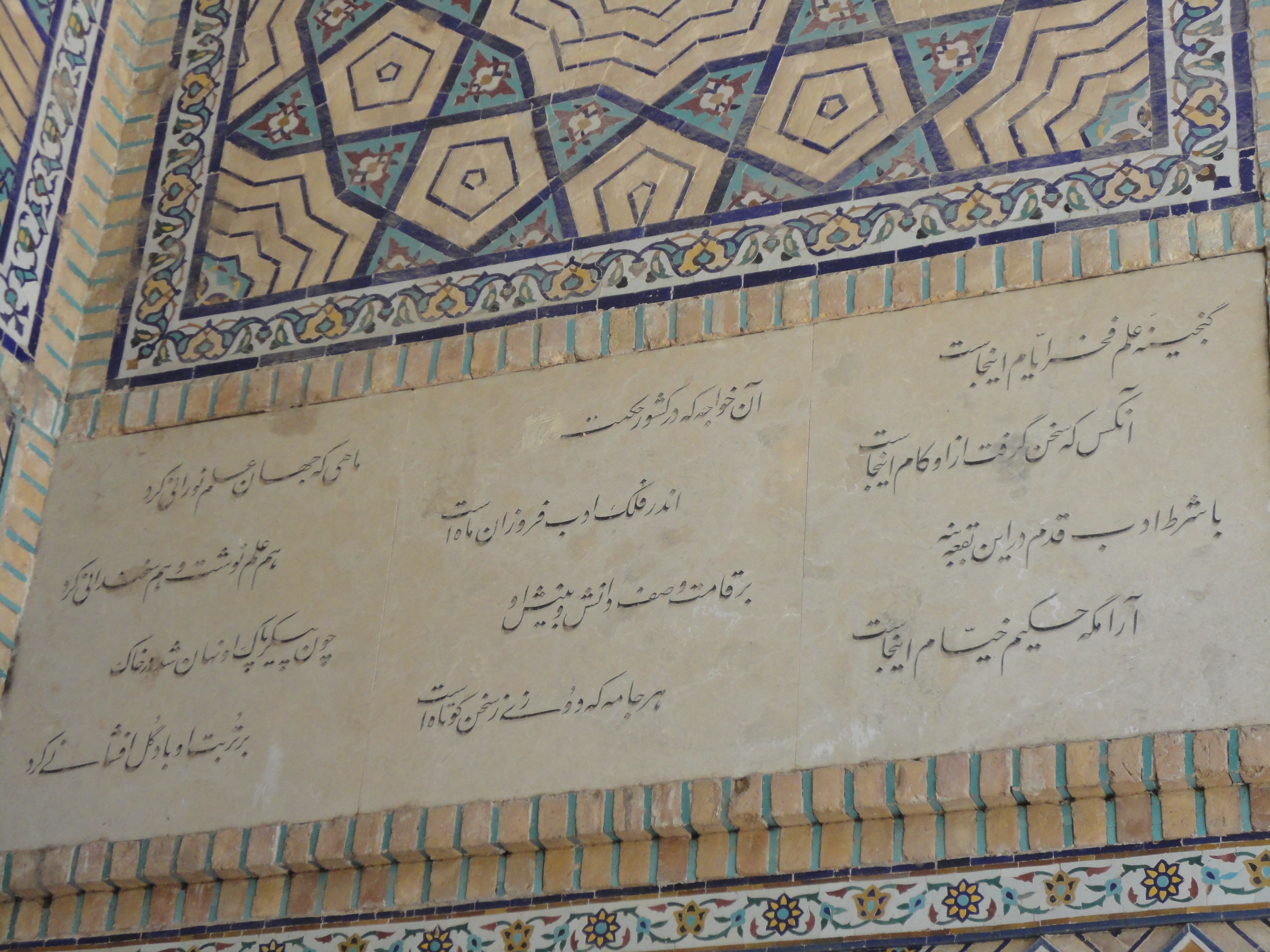
A poem about the tomb, in Persian, written in Nasaliq script

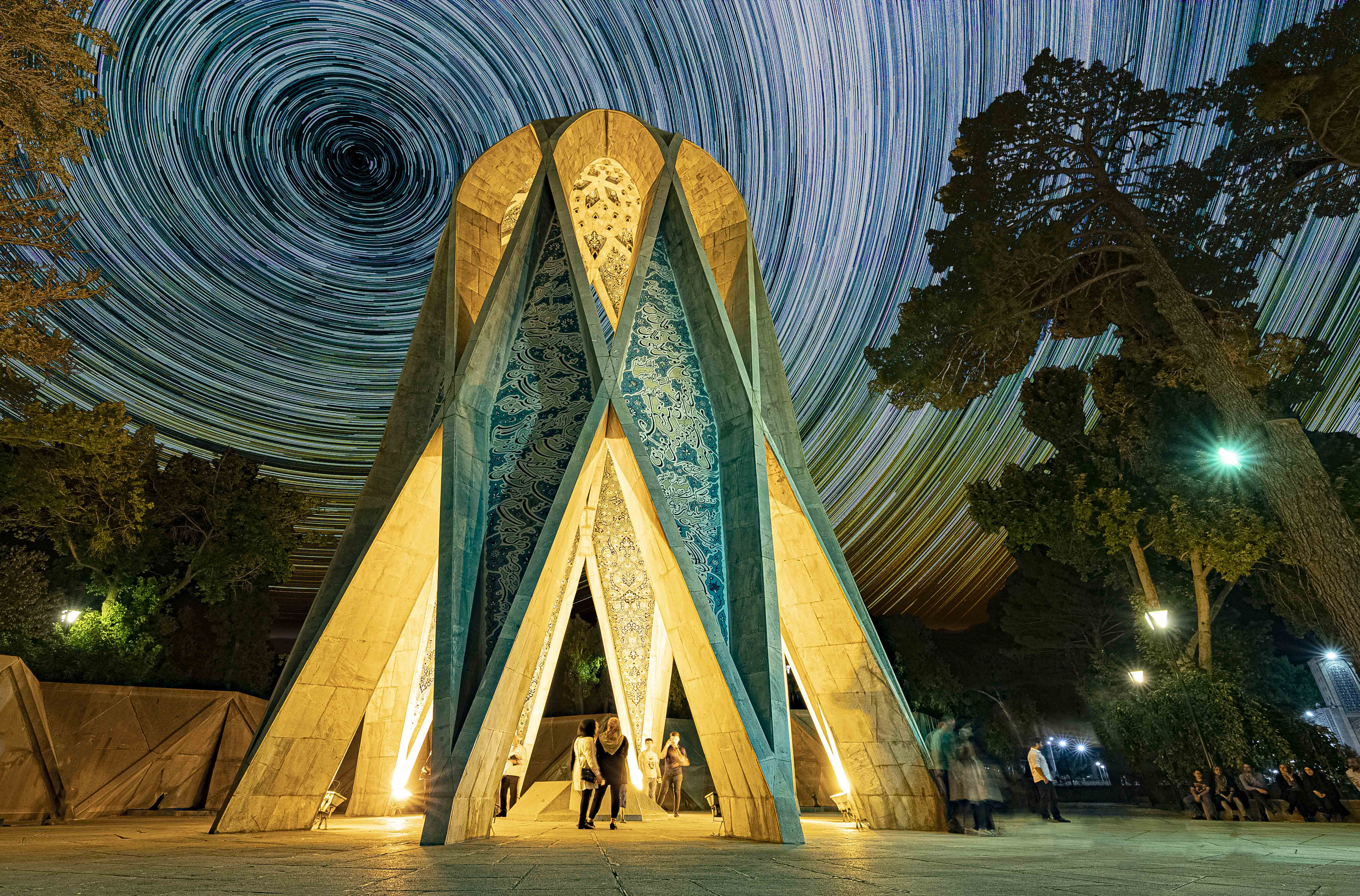

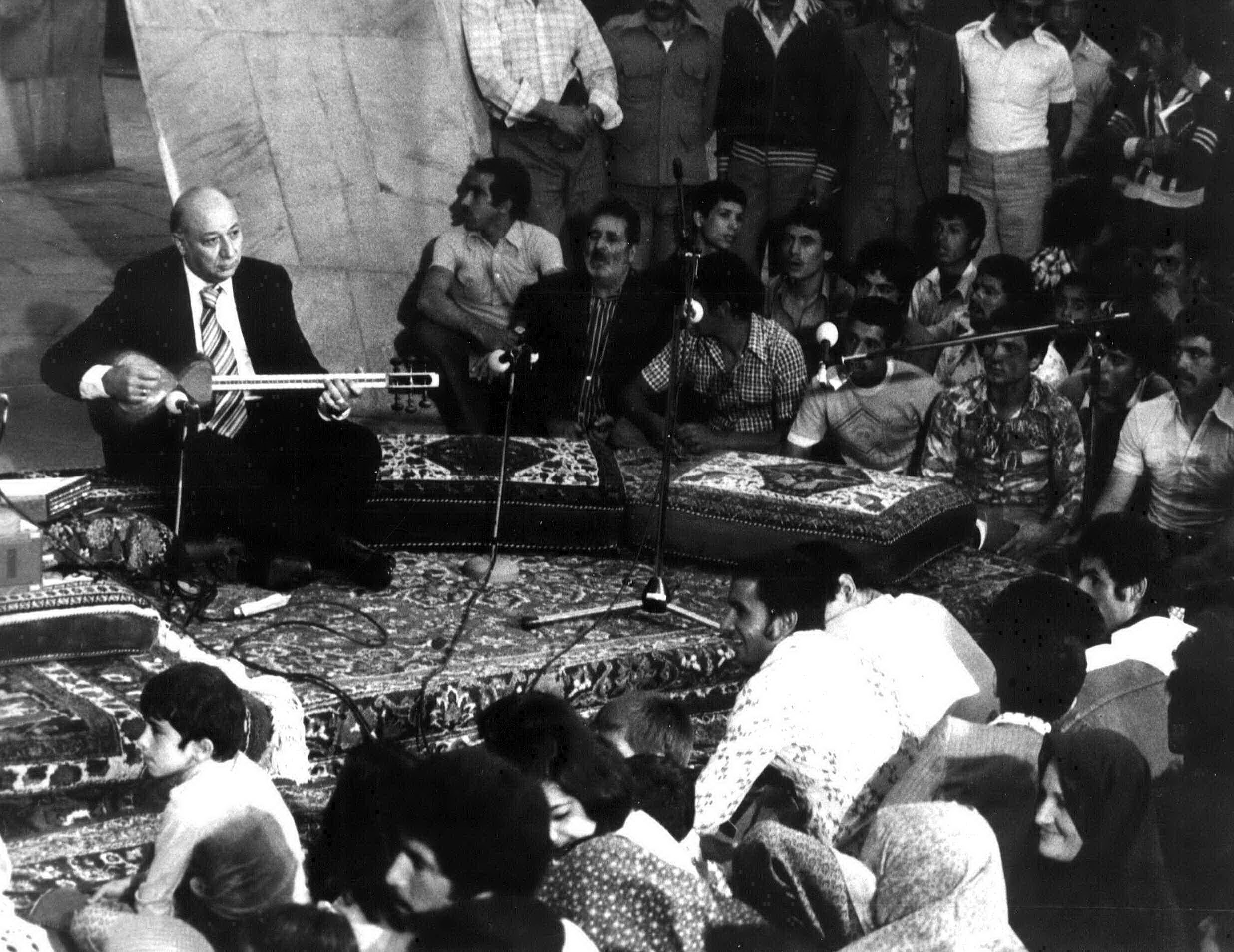
Jalil Shahnaz in the mausoleum, in 1975

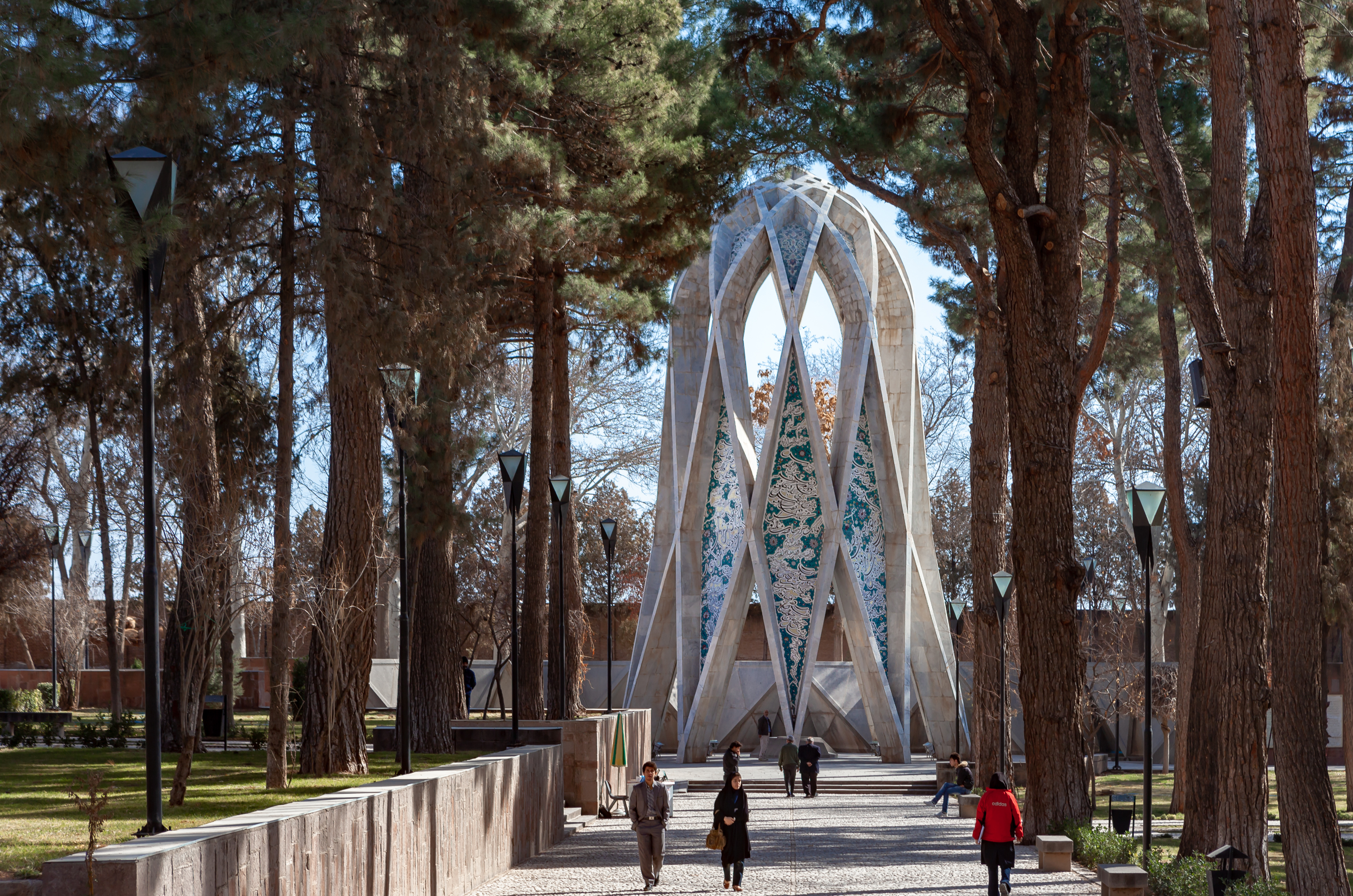
January 2011

== See also ==
- List of mausoleums in Iran
- Islam in Iran
