= Tomb of Nader Shah =

Tomb in Mashhad, Iran

- آرامگاه نادرشاه
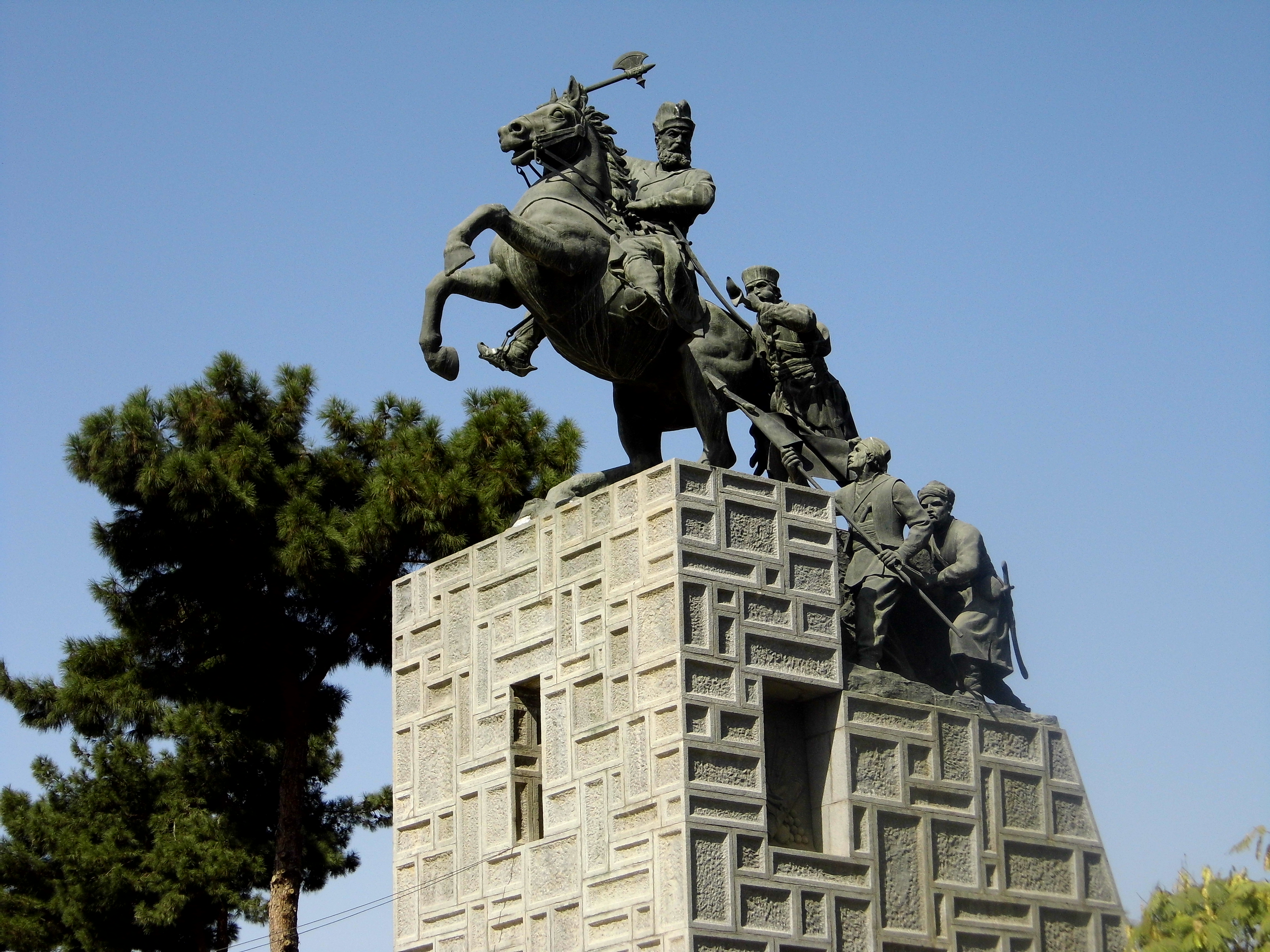

- Location of the tomb in Iran

Religion
- Affiliation: Islam
- Ecclesiastical or organizational status: Mausoleum
- Status: Active

Location
- Location: Mashhad, Razavi Khorasan province
- Country: Iran
- Interactive map of Tomb of Nader Shah
- Coordinates: 36°17′42″N 59°36′38″E

Architecture
- Architect: Hooshang Seyhoun
- Type: Islamic architecture
- Style: Mughal; Pahlavi
- Completed: 1963

Specifications
- Dome: One
- Shrine: One: Nader Shah
- Materials: Granite

Iran National Heritage List
- Official name: Tomb of Nader Shah
- Type: Built
- Designated: 9 December 1975
- Reference no.: 1174
- Conservation organization: Cultural Heritage, Handicrafts and Tourism Organization of Iran

The Tomb of Nader Shah (Persian: آرامگاه نادرشاه), also known as the Mausoleum of Nader Shah, is a mausoleum located in Mashhad, in the northeastern province of Razavi Khorasan, Iran. Designed by Hooshang Seyhoun and completed in 1963, the structure contains the grave of Nader Shah.

The structure was added to the Iran National Heritage List on 9 December 1975, administered by the Cultural Heritage, Handicrafts and Tourism Organization of Iran.

== About Nader Shah ==
Nader Shah was born into an ordinary family from the Qirqlu branch of the Afshars, a Turkic tribe living in Khorasan. When Safavid Iran was invaded by the Afghans, he entered the service of Safavid shah Tahmasp II and was named Tahmasp Qoli Khan. Subsequently, he defeated the Afghans, the Ottomans, and the Russians in a short period of time. During this process, he strengthened his position, dethroned Tahmasp II in 1732, and proclaimed himself the regent to the new shah, Tahmasp II's infant son, Abbas III. In 1736, calling a congress in Mughan, he dethroned Abbas III and declared himself shah, ending 235 years of Safavid rule.

== Tomb history ==
After Nader Shah's successful campaign against the Mughal Empire, he returned with immense wealth: the Peacock Throne, the Koh-i-Noor and Daria-i-Noor diamonds, and "700 elephants, 4,000 camels and 12,000 horses carrying wagons all laden with gold, silver and precious stones". After the precious jewels brought from India were hidden near Kalat, Nader ordered the Mughal architects he had brought with himself to build the Sun Palace to store the jewels and possibly act as a mausoleum for him.

Nader Shah was assassinated in 1747 and the incomplete Sun Palace was turned into a residence for local rulers of the Qajar era. Nader Shah's body remained un-commemorated until the 1960s when a concrete monument was constructed for him in the vicinity of a heavily polluted traffic intersection in Mashhad.

== Gallery ==
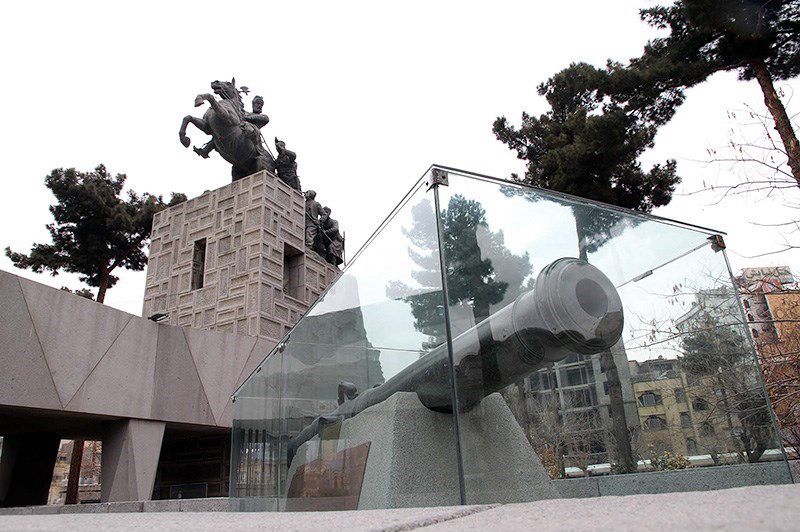

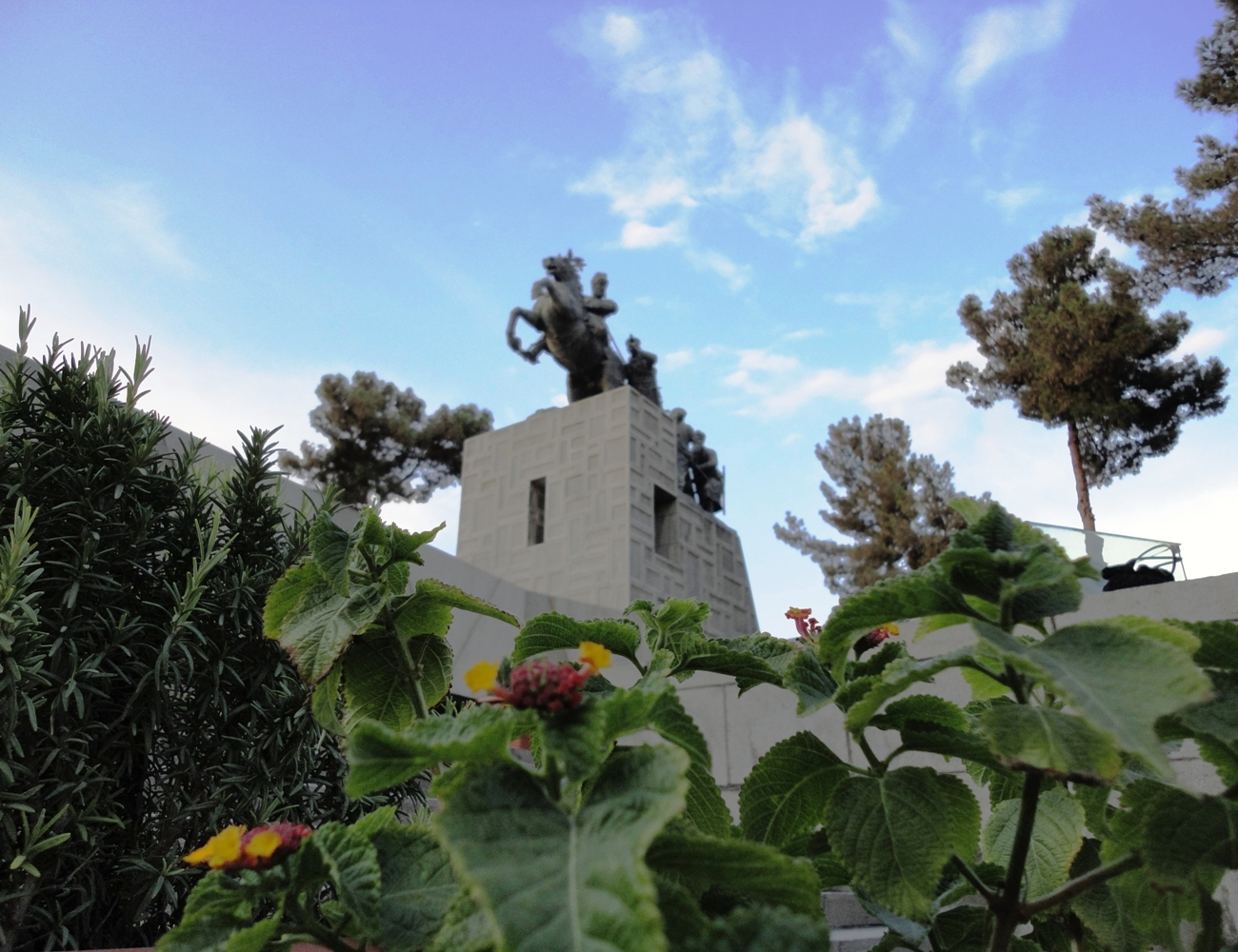

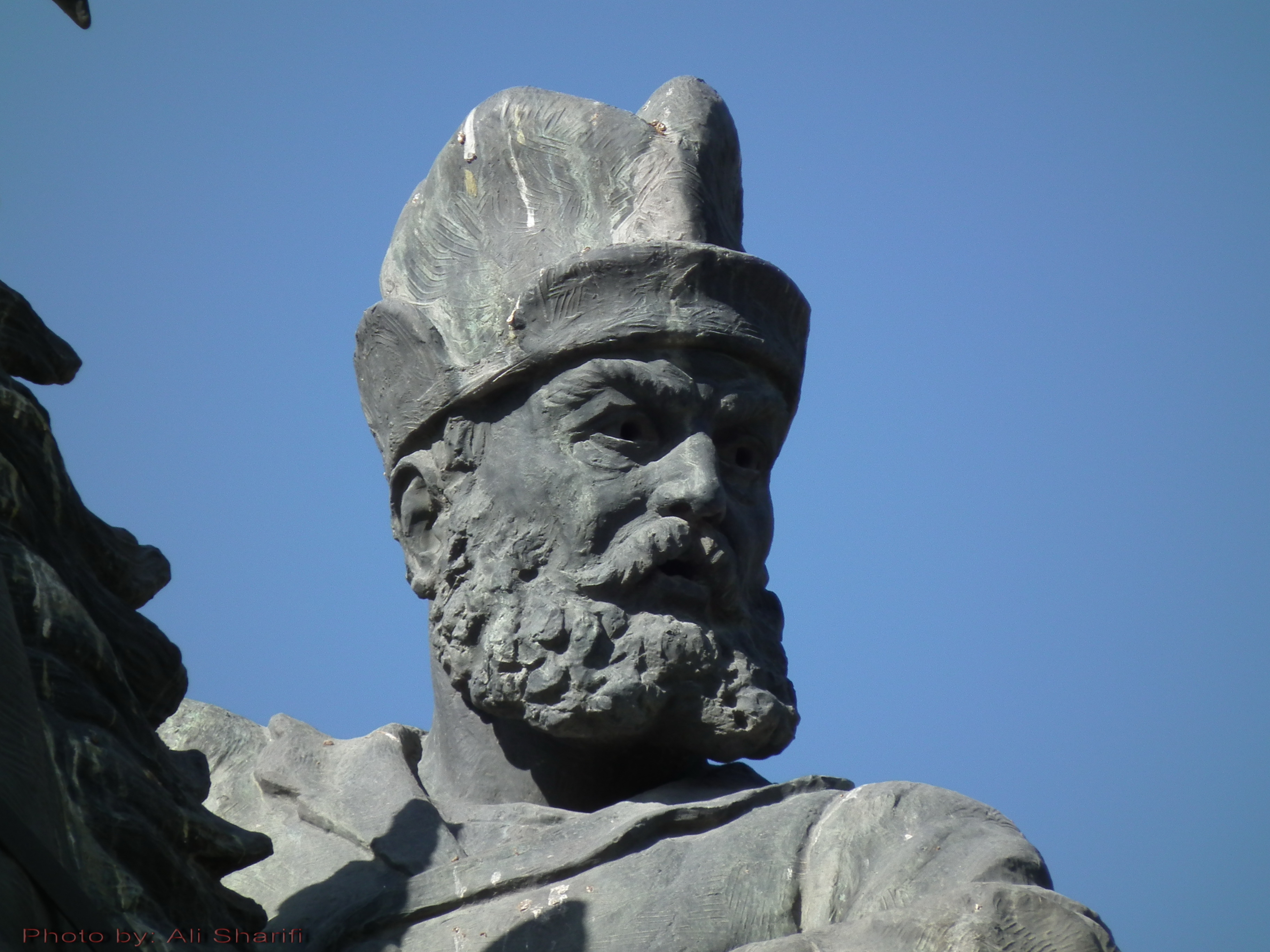
Head of Nader Shah's statue

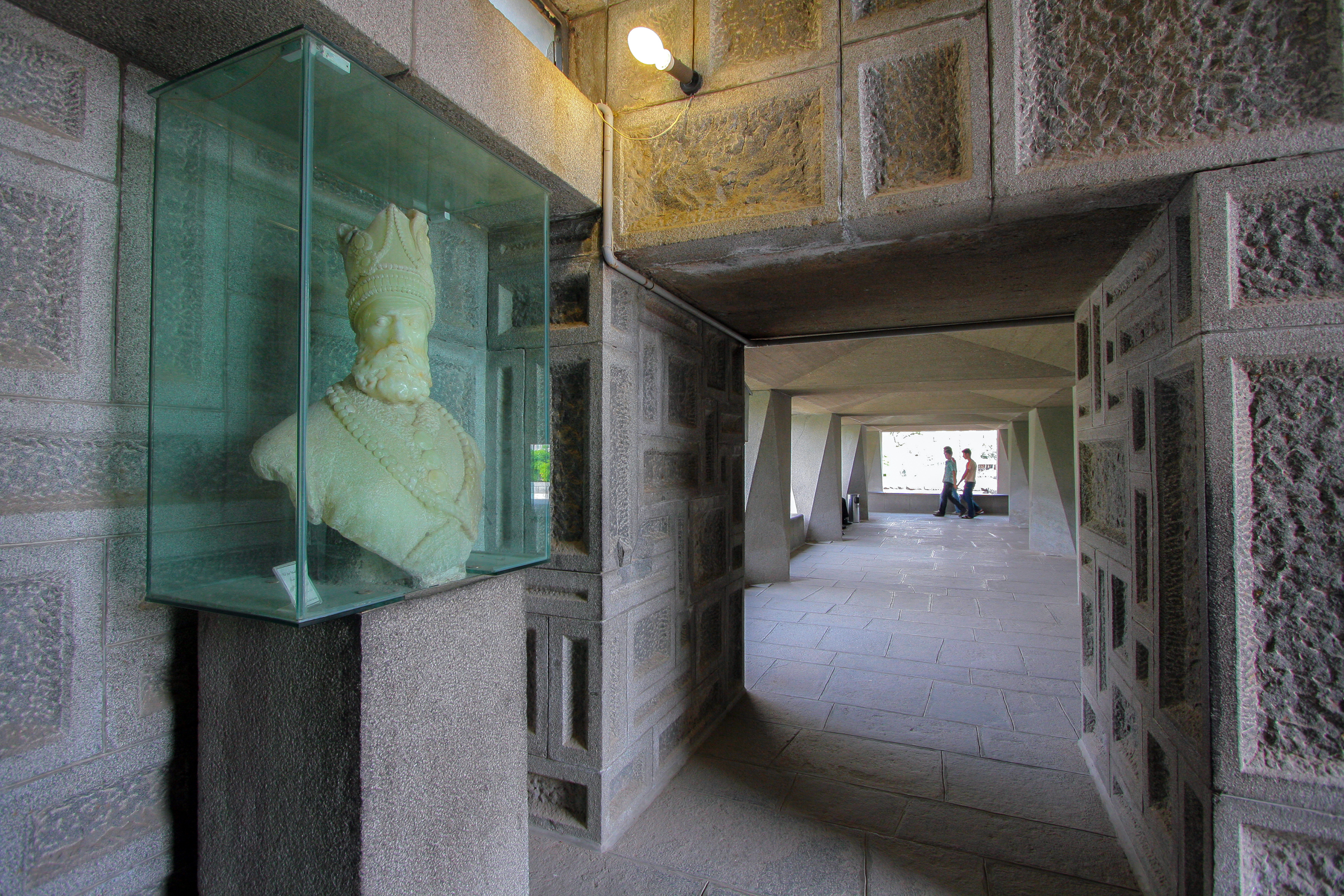

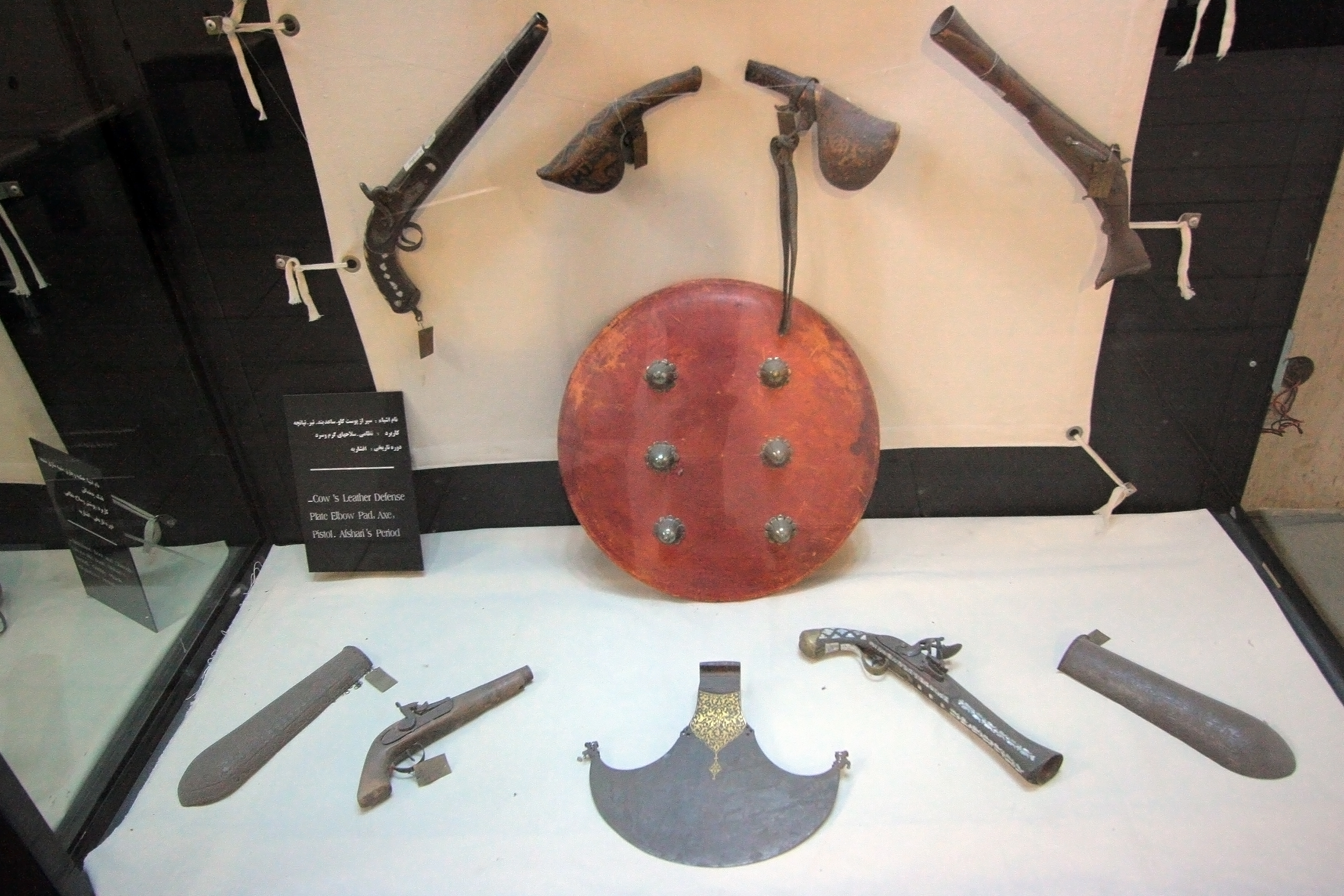

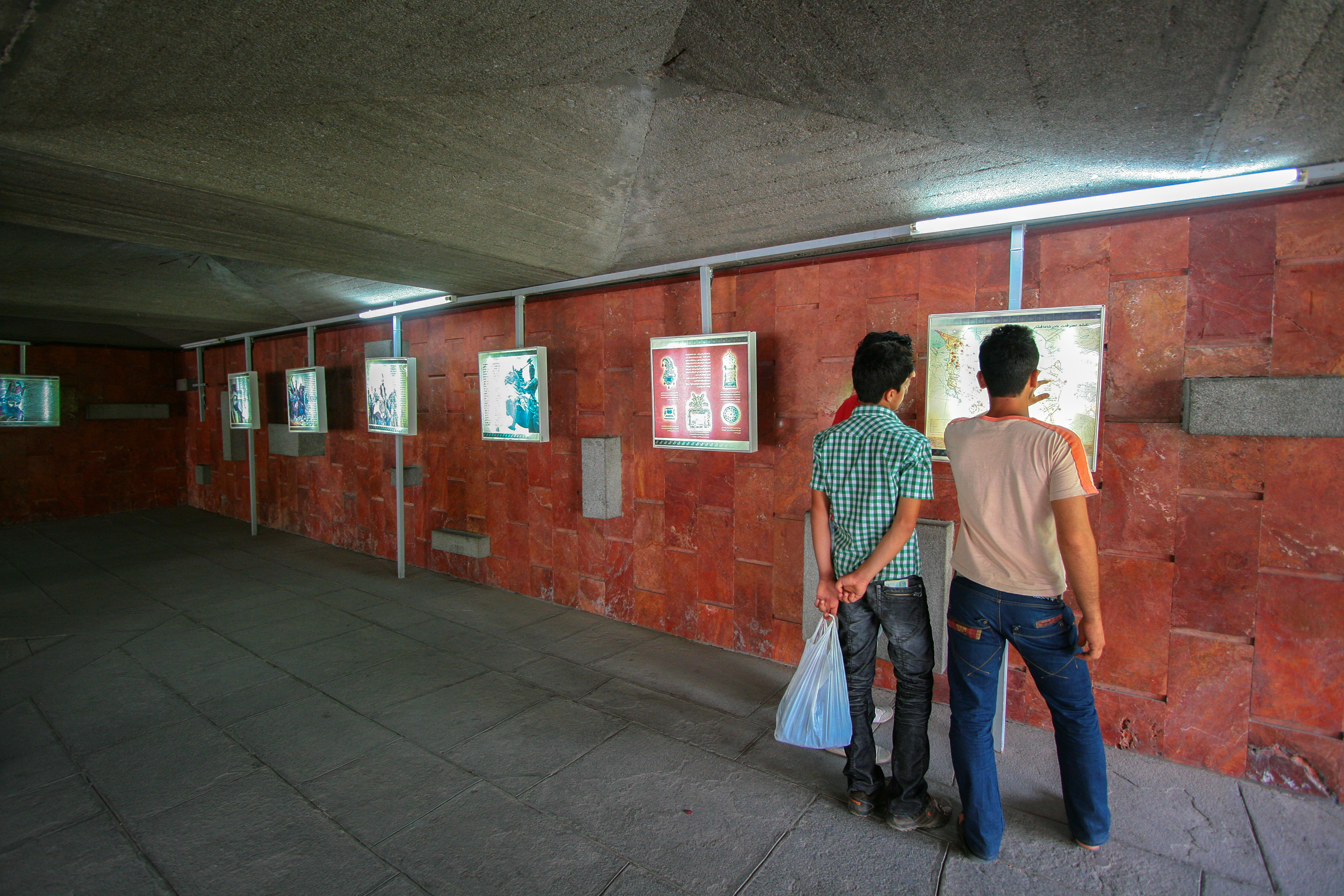

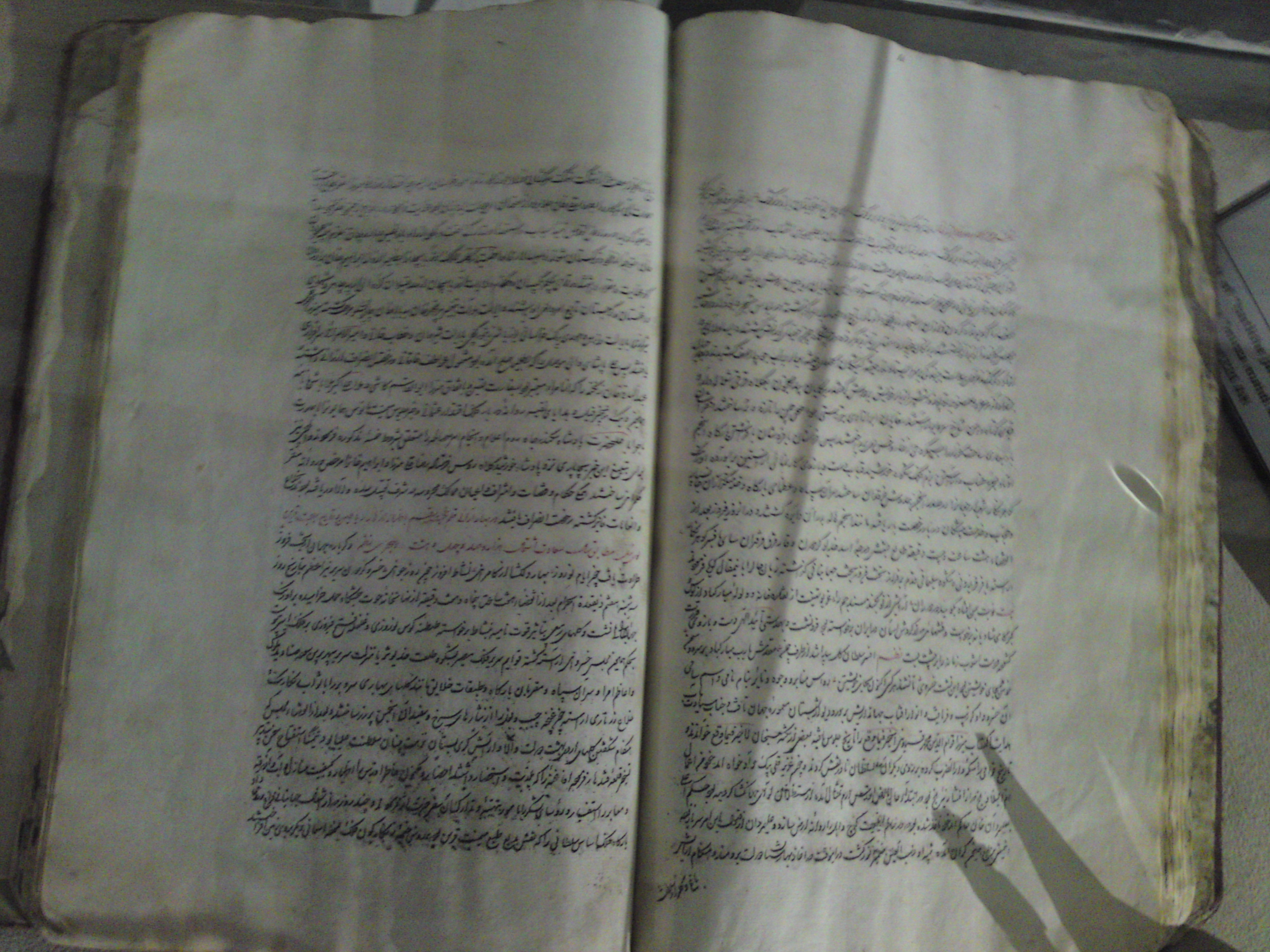

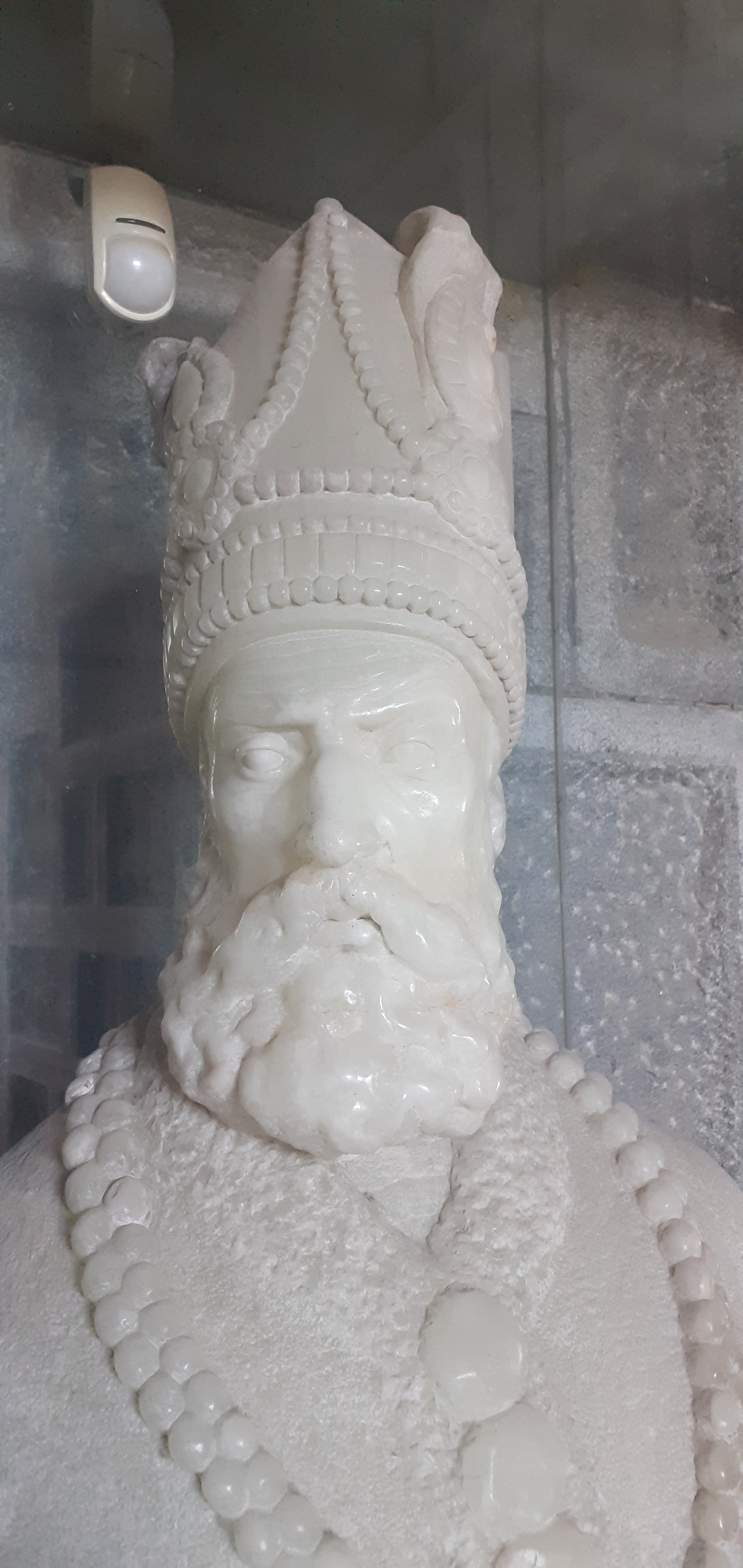
The statue of Nader Shah, kept in the mausoleum

== See also ==
- List of mausoleums in Iran
- Islam in Iran
