= Massoumeh Seyhoun =

Iranian artist and gallerist (1934–2010)

Massumeh Noushin Seyhoun
- منیر نوشین
- Born: Monir Noushin; 1934; Rasht, Gilan province, Iran
- Died: 21 May 2010 (aged 75–76); Tehran, Iran
- Education: Faculty of Fine Arts, Tehran
- Occupations: Gallerist, curator, visual artist
- Known for: Painting
- Spouse: Hooshang Seyhoun (m. 1950; div. 1973)
- Children: 2

Massumeh Noushin Seyhoun, Professionally known as Massumeh Seyhoun, (Persian: معصومه سیحون;1934–21 May 2010), née Monir Noushin (Persian: منیر نوشین) was an Iranian painter, curator, and gallerist. She was the founder in 1966 of Seyhoun Gallery, Tehran, the longest-lived art gallery in Iran.

== Biography ==
Massumeh Seyhoun was born as Monir Noushin in 1934 in Rasht. Her family settled in Ahvaz, and she changed her name to Massumeh. She studied at the Faculty of Fine Arts of Tehran, where her teacher was Hooshang Seyhoun, architect, sculptor, painter, who became her husband, and they had two children.

When Seyhoun's health started failing in the mid-1990s, she passed control of the gallery to her son Nader. Her daughter, Maryam, opened the Seyhoun Gallery, Los Angeles, on Melrose Avenue in West Hollywood, an outpost of the Tehran gallery in the United States. The gallery exhibits Iranian expatriate artists and artists based in Iran, many of whom have worked with the Seyhoun Gallery in Tehran.

== Seyhoun Gallery ==
In 1966, Masoumeh Seyhoun, with the help of her husband Hooshang Seyhoun, founded Seyhoun Gallery. It is one of Iran's first art galleries and is considered the oldest active art gallery in the country.
