= Hooshang Seyhoun =

Iranian architect, sculptor, painter, scholar, and professor (1920–2014)

Houshang Seyhoun
- هوشنگ سیحون
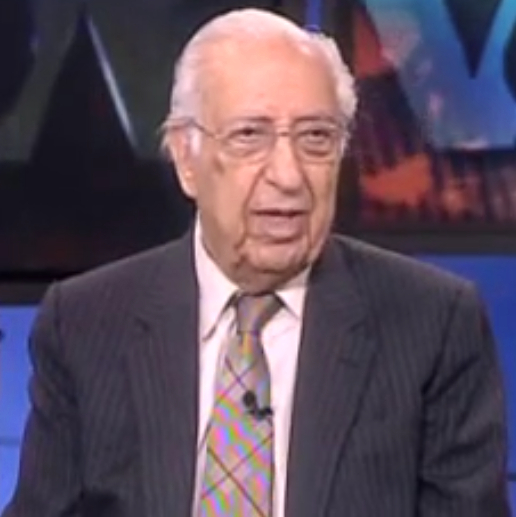
- Born: Houshang Seyhoun; August 22, 1920; Tehran, Sublime State of Iran
- Died: May 26, 2014 (aged 93); Vancouver, British Columbia, Canada
- Citizenship: Iran; Canada; France
- Education: University of Tehran; École nationale supérieure des Beaux-Arts
- Occupations: Architect, sculptor, painter
- Spouse: Massoumeh Seyhoun (m. 1950; div. 1973)
- Children: 2
- Design: Tomb of Ferdowsi; Mausoleum of Omar Khayyám; Avicenna Mausoleum; Tomb of Nader Shah

Houshang Seyhoun (August 22, 1920 – May 26, 2014; Persian: هوشنگ سیحون) was an Iranian architect, sculptor, painter, scholar and professor.

He studied fine arts at the École nationale supérieure des Beaux-Arts in Paris, and earned a degree in architecture from University of Tehran.

Seyhoun is noted especially for his innovative and creative architectural design. His architectural legacy includes countless monuments and over one thousand private villas. After the Iranian Revolution, he moved to Vancouver and lived in exile until his death.

Seyhoun became famous for his design work in the 1950s in Iran, including Tehran's Central Railway Station and tombs of scientific/literary figures (such as the Avicenna Mausoleum in Hamadan). He has been a faculty member of Tehran University's College of Architecture, where he also served as Dean of the College of Fine Arts (Beaux arts) of Tehran University for six years.

== Life ==
He was born into a Baháʼí family renowned for music. His grandfather, Mirza Abdollah Farahani, was a pioneer in traditional music and is known as the father of traditional music in Iran. His mother, Mowloud Khanom, played Setar, and his uncle, Ahmad Ebadi, was Setar's Ostad (Maestro).

Houshang Seyhoun began his academic journey at the College of Art and Architecture (Honarkadeh), studying under Andre Godard and Maxime Siroux. Within this educational framework, students were afforded the choice of three architectural design studios, with Seyhoun electing to enroll in Siroux's studio, citing the latter's profound dedication to and affinity for Iran as a pivotal factor in his decision-making process.

After finishing his studies in architecture at Tehran University, he went to Paris to continue his education at the invitation of Andre Godard. Seyhoun's prior architectural victories in competitions, particularly in designing mausoleums for Ferdowsi and Ebne Sina, solidified his reputation. His academic journey reached its pinnacle with the completion of his formal training at the École des Beaux-Arts in 1948, highlighted by his final project "Le mausolée d'Avicenne à Hamadan." After three years of education under the supervision of Othello Zavaroni, he received his Ph.D. in art. After returning to Iran, he created his first work at the age of 23, a memorial monument on the grave of Abu-Ali Sina.

Subsequently, Seyhoun's ascent within academia led him to assume the role of dean at the School of Fine Arts at the University of Tehran, succeeding Mohsen Foroughi in 1961. As dean, Seyhoun revamped the curriculum to include instruction on Iranian historical architecture. He led his students in exploring diverse structures across Iran, and their collaboration with the antiquities department resulted in the elevation of numerous neglected buildings to the status of historic sites.

Seyhoun's architectural innovations also extended to designing monuments honoring Iranian poets and polymaths, such as the acclaimed Tomb of Omar Khayyam. He was a member of The National Committee of Archeology, The High Committee of Urbanization, The Central Committee of All Universities of Iran, and The International Committee of Icomos, and for 15 years, he was in charge of repairing historical constructions in Iran.

He believed that a good architect must, like a poet, be simple and easy.

His body was buried wrapped in the three-color lion-and-sun flag of Iran and A Derafsh Kaviani in a coffin in Forest Lawn's graveyard in Los Angeles. In his will, he asked that all his paintings and drawings be given to a museum in Iran.

== Works ==
Seyhoun's work includes several monuments such as the Avicenna Mausoleum in Hamadan, Tomb of Ferdowsi and Tomb of Nader Shah in Mashhad and Omar Khayyam Mausoleum in Nishapur.
