= Shah Abbasi Caravansarai, Nishapur =

Caravanserai in Nishapur

Shah Abbasi Caravansarai of Nishapur
- کاروانسرای شاه‌عباسی نیشابور
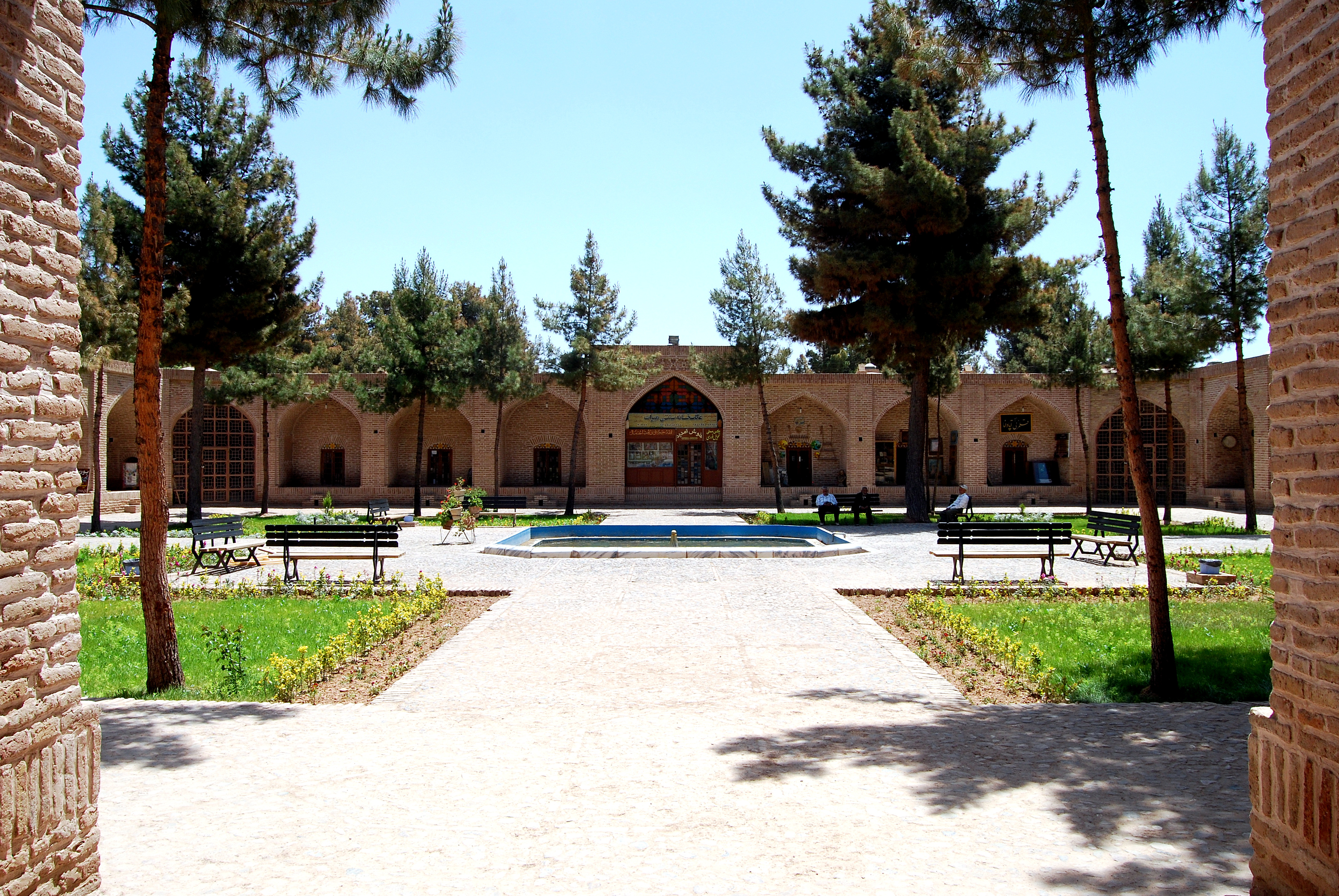
- Shah Abbasi Caravansarai of Nishapur
- Interactive map of the Shah Abbasi Caravansarai of Nishapur area

General information
- Status: Open to the public
- Type: Caravanserai
- Architectural style: Persian architecture
- Location: Nishapur, Razavi Khorasan Province, Iran

The Shah Abbasi Caravansarai of Nishapur (Persian: کاروانسرای شاه‌عباسی) is a Safavid era caravanserai located in central Nishapur. This caravanserai was built by the orders of the Safavid Shah, Abbas the Great. Listed as a national heritage of Iran with the registration number 1230, it is now a tourist attraction and houses several handicraft shops and two museums.

== Gallery ==
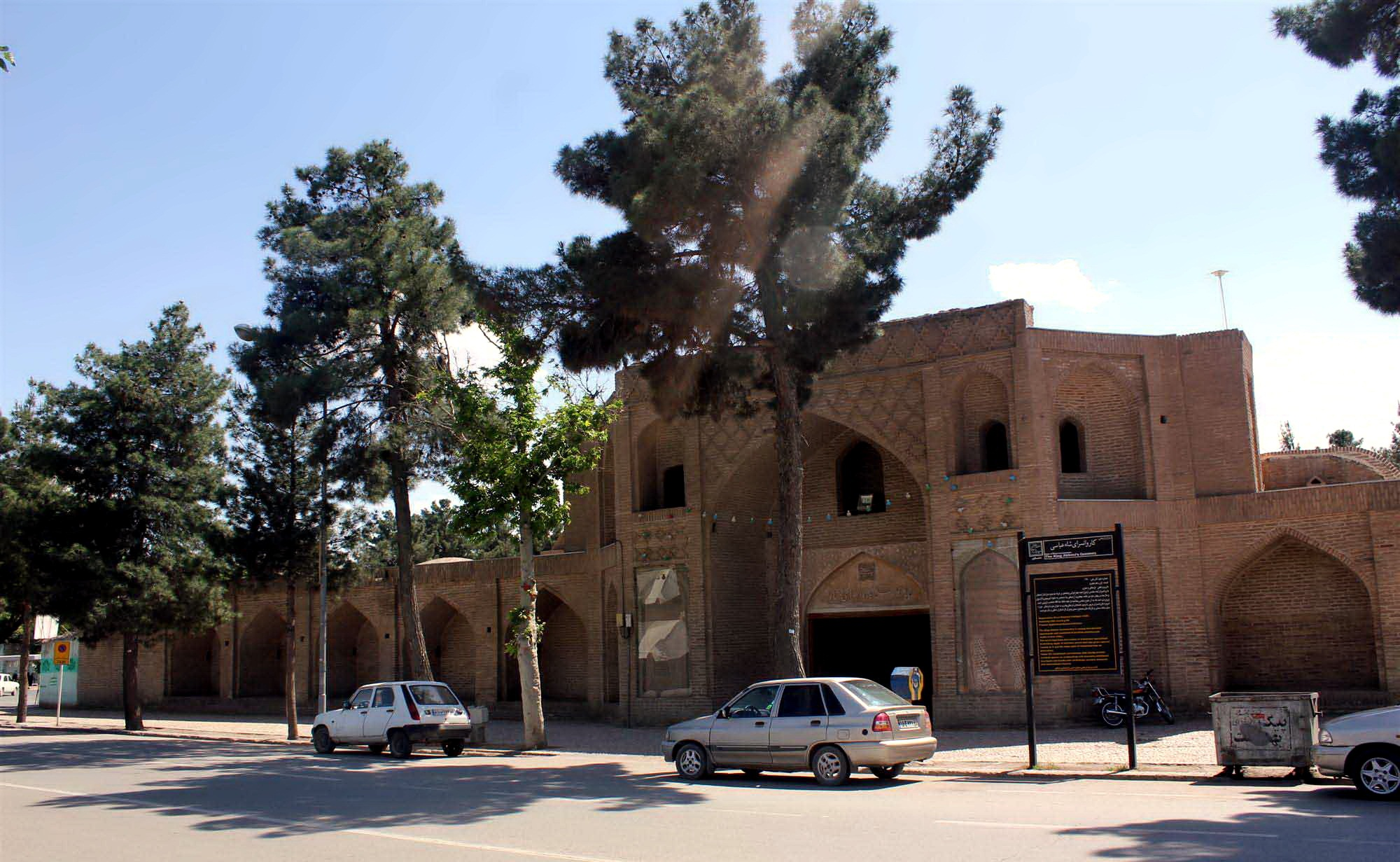
Exterior view

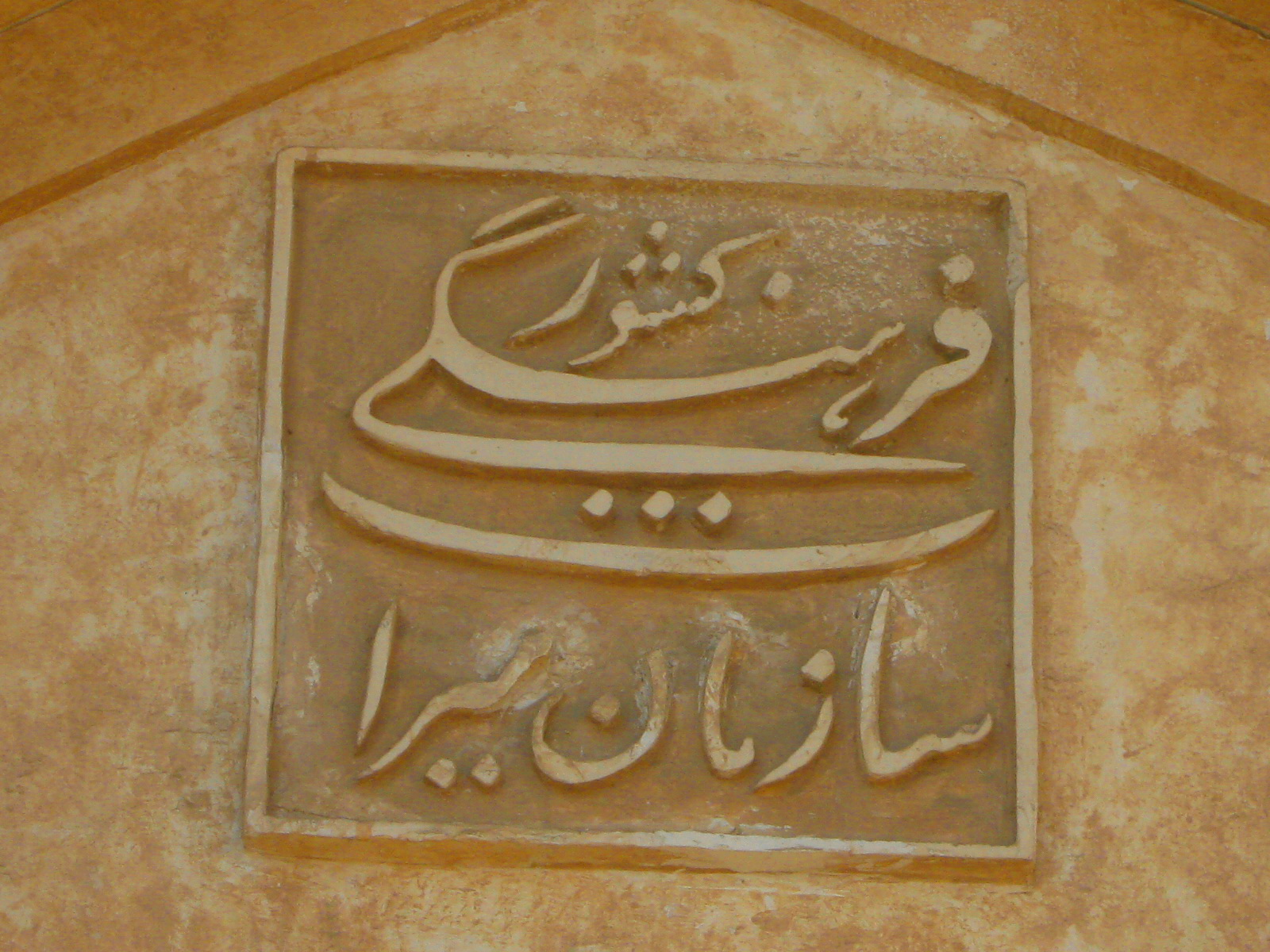

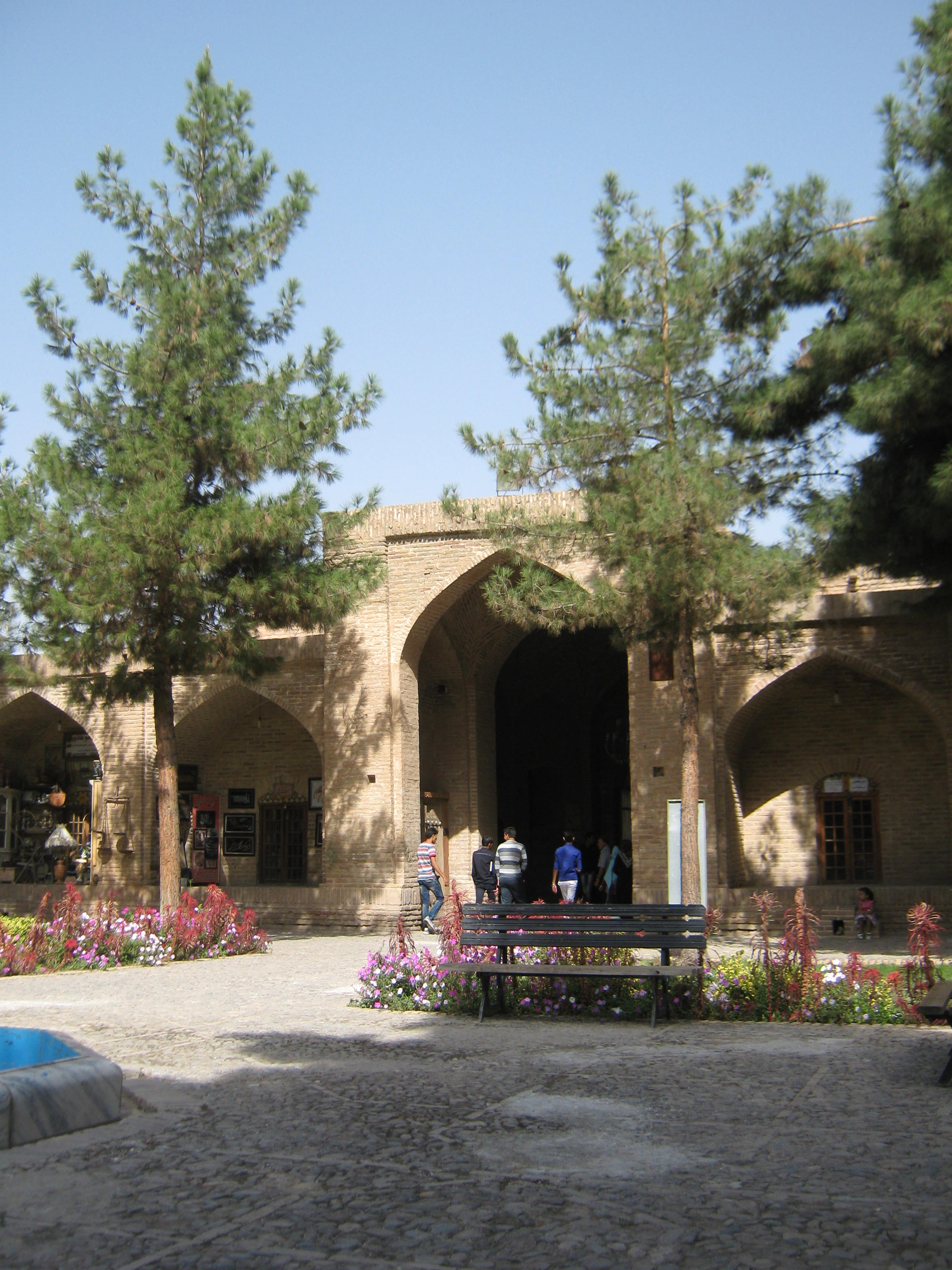

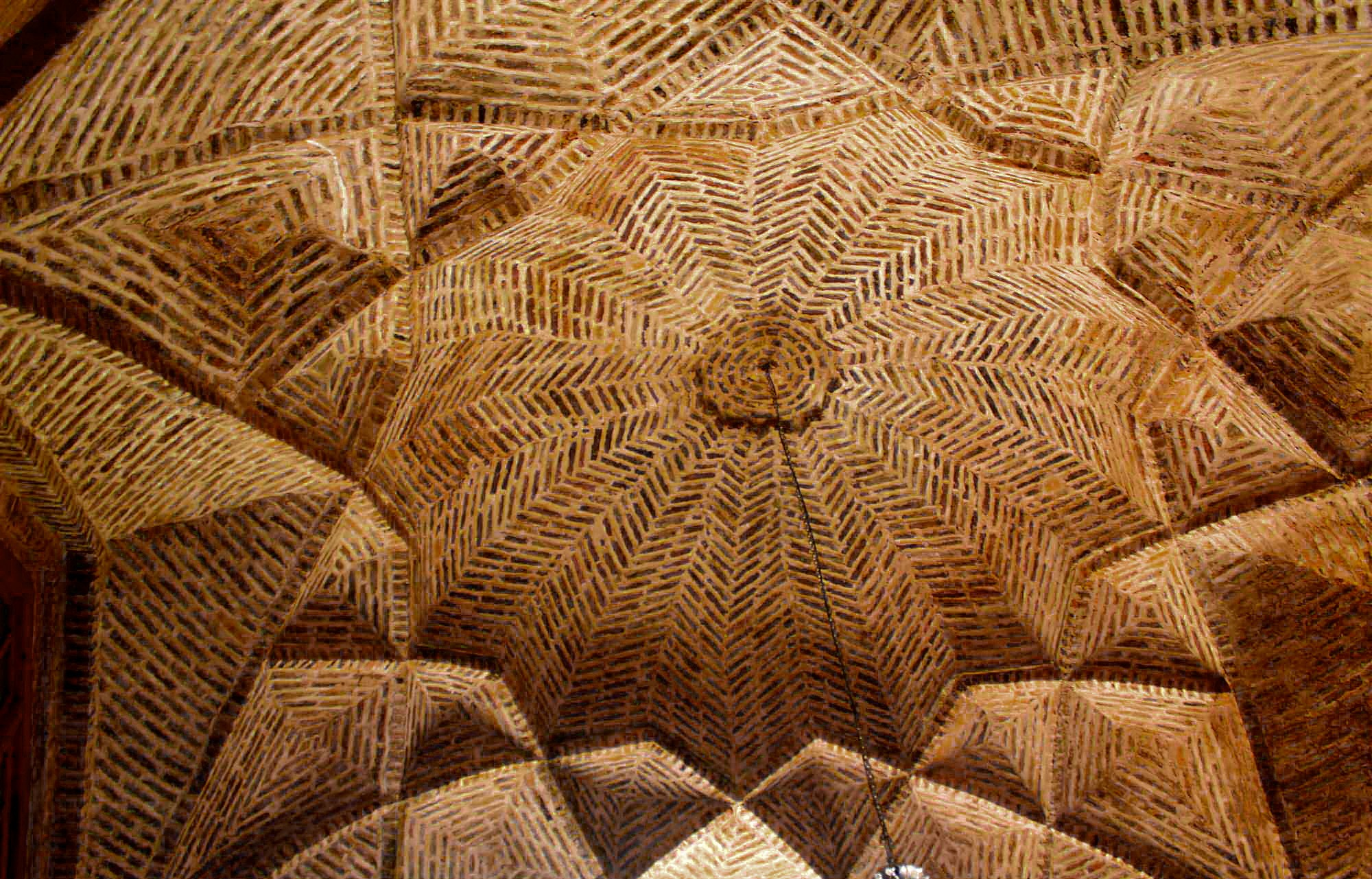

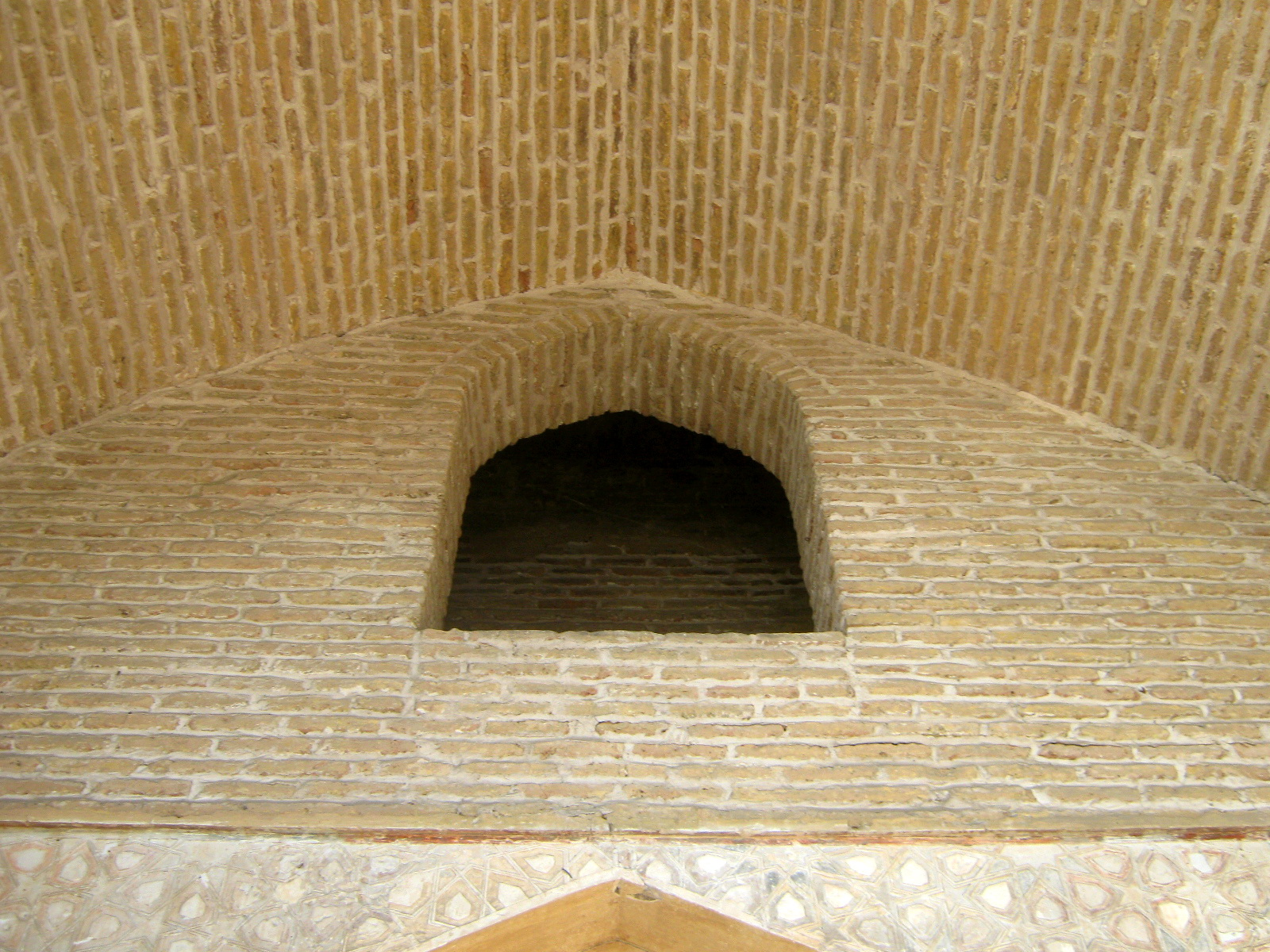

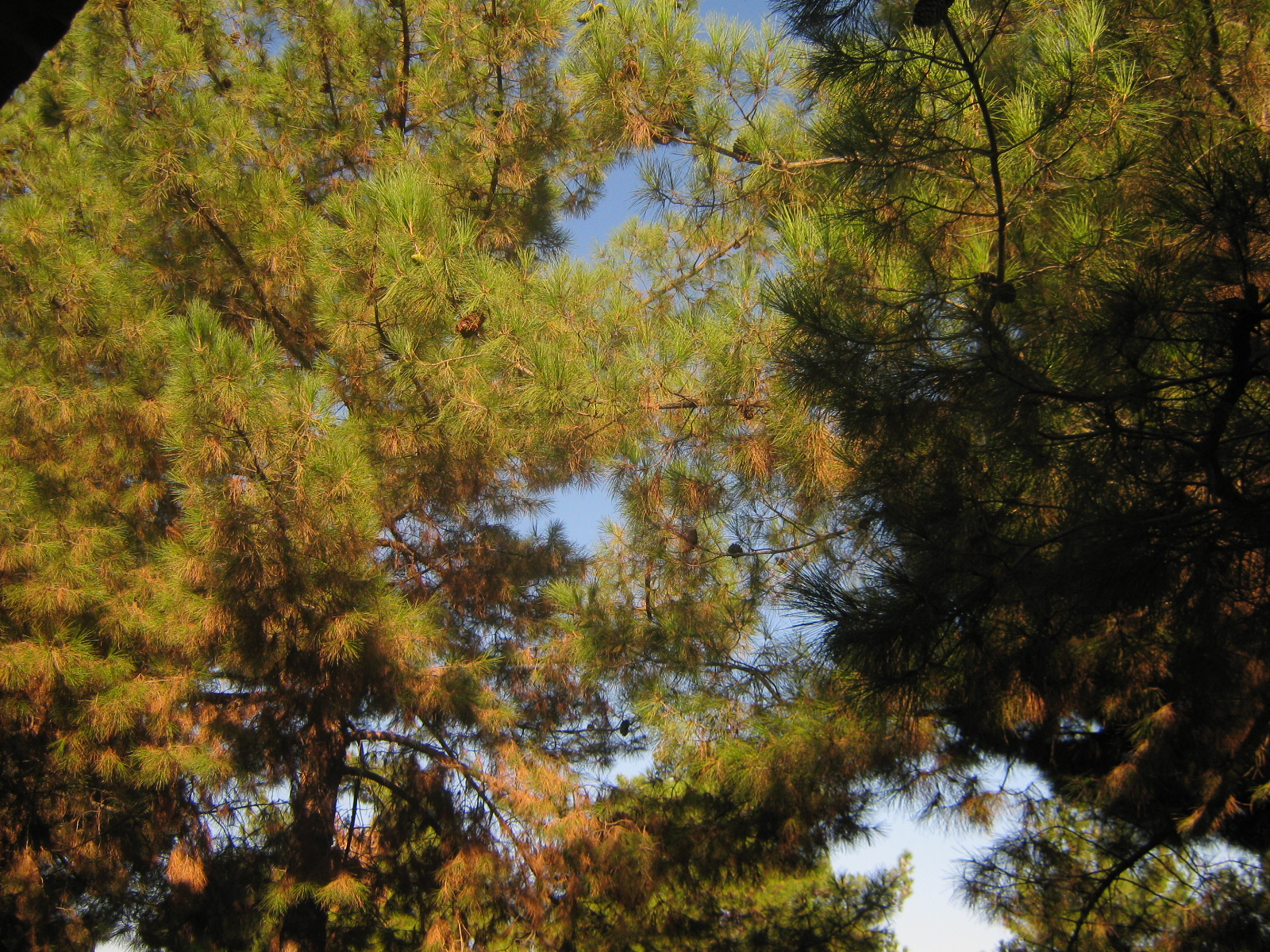
Trees inside

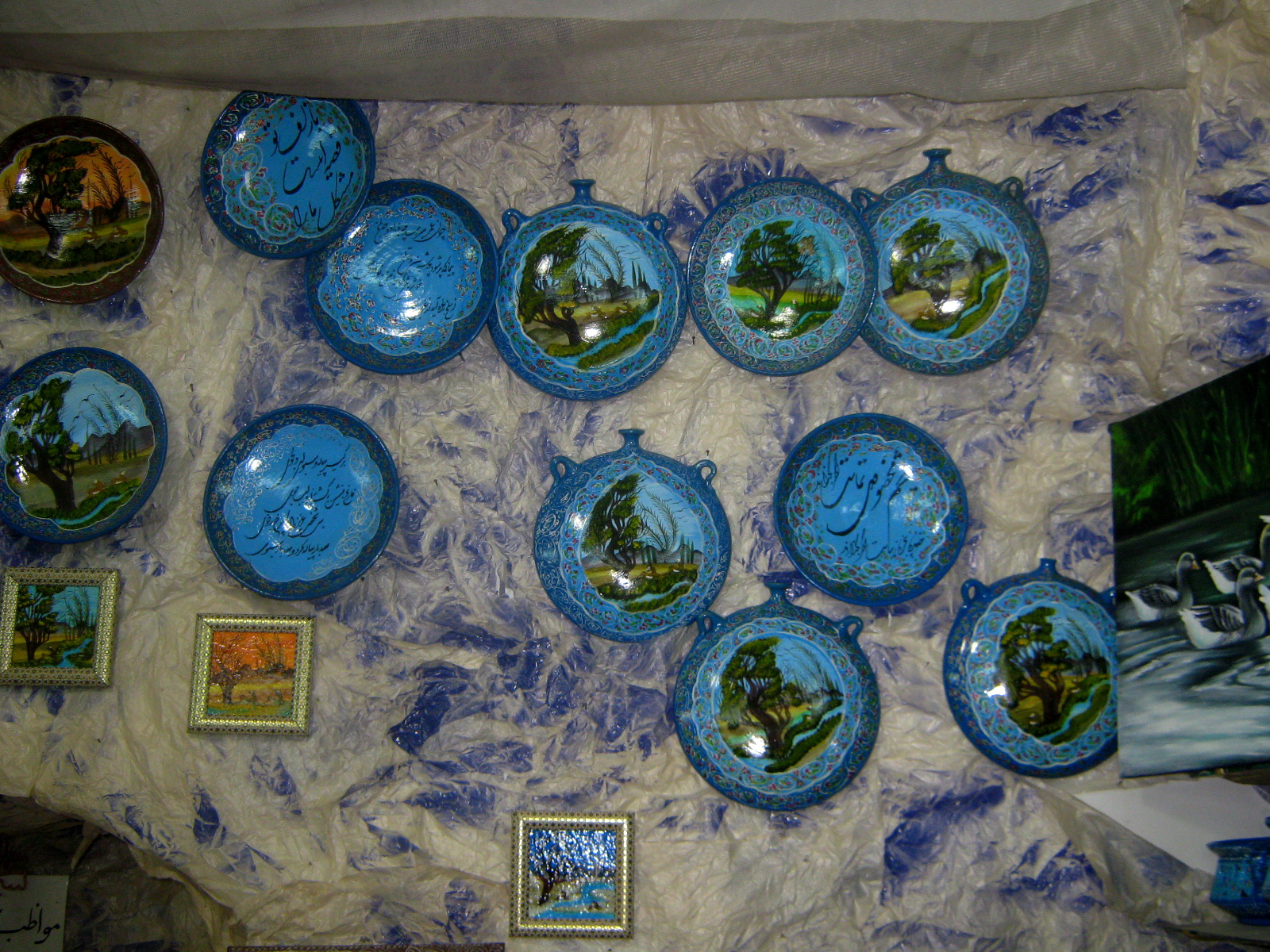

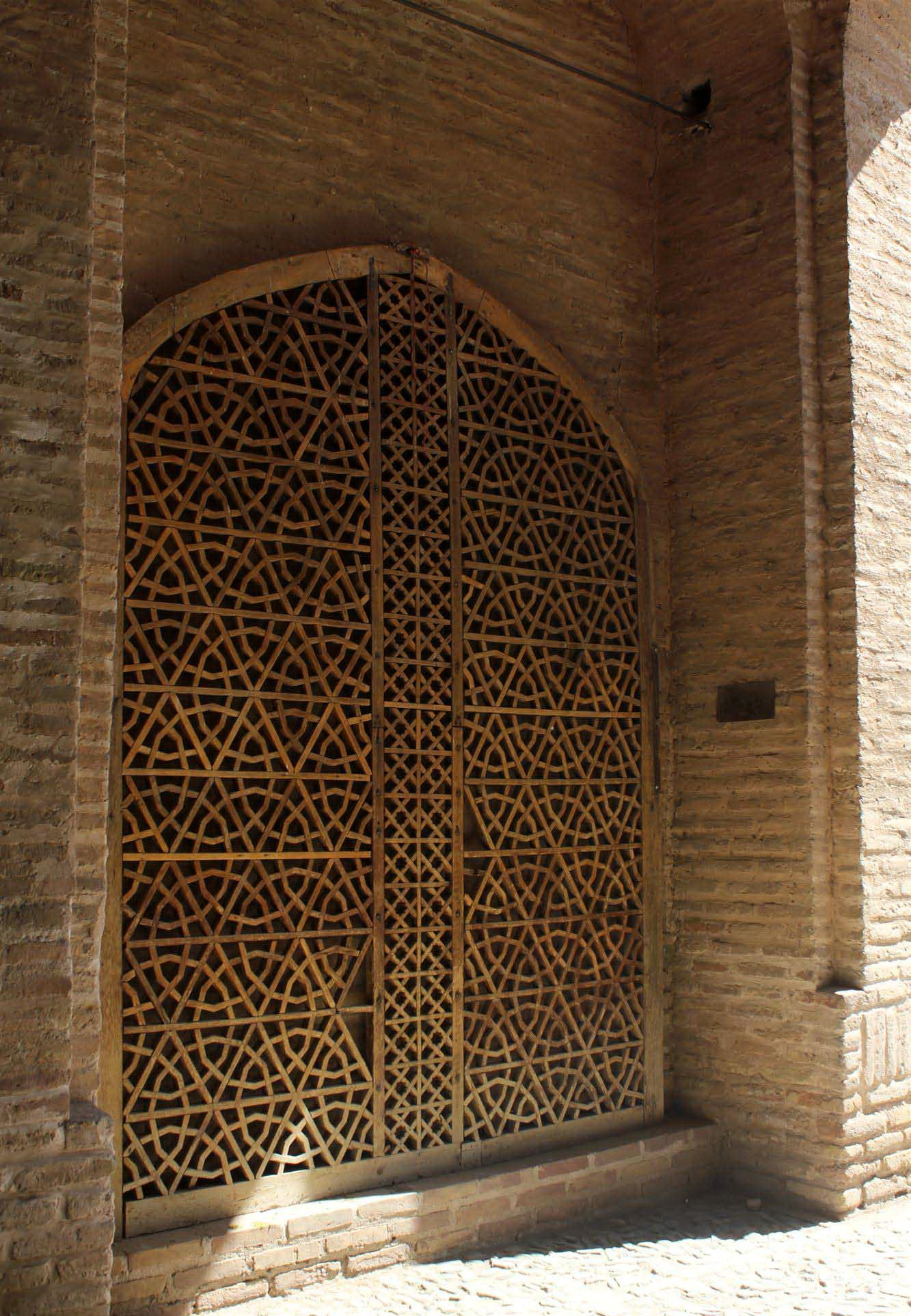
Interior

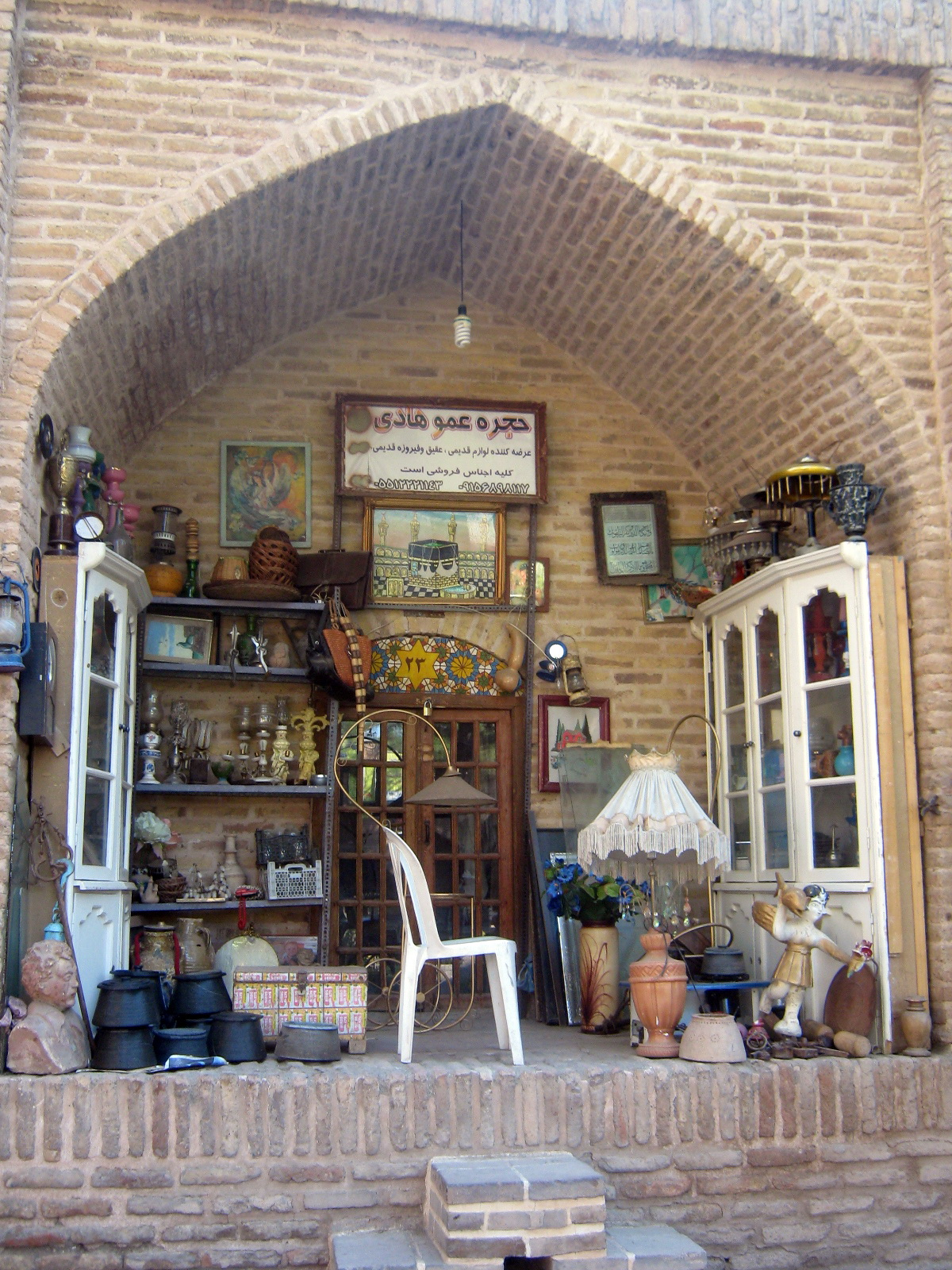

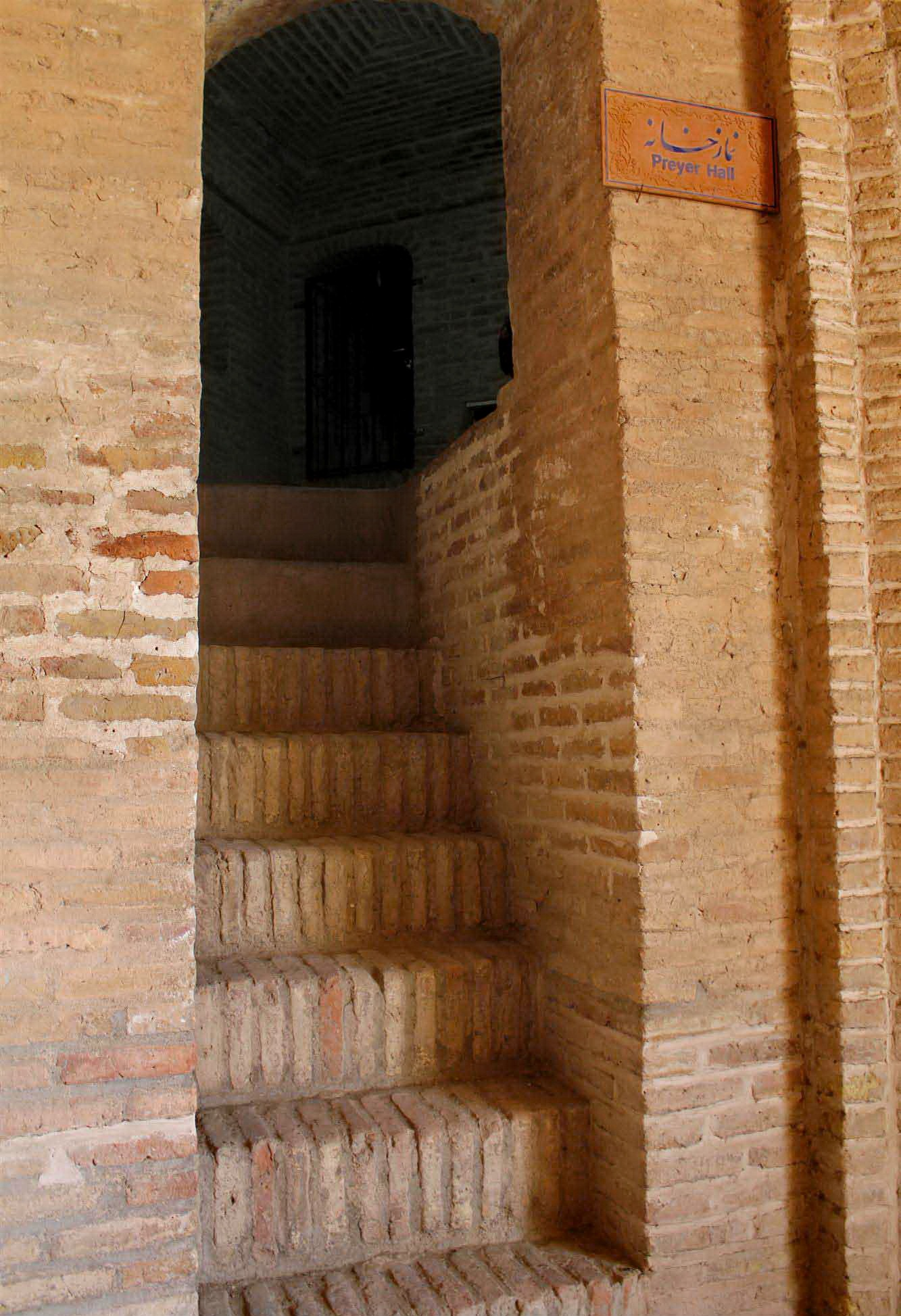

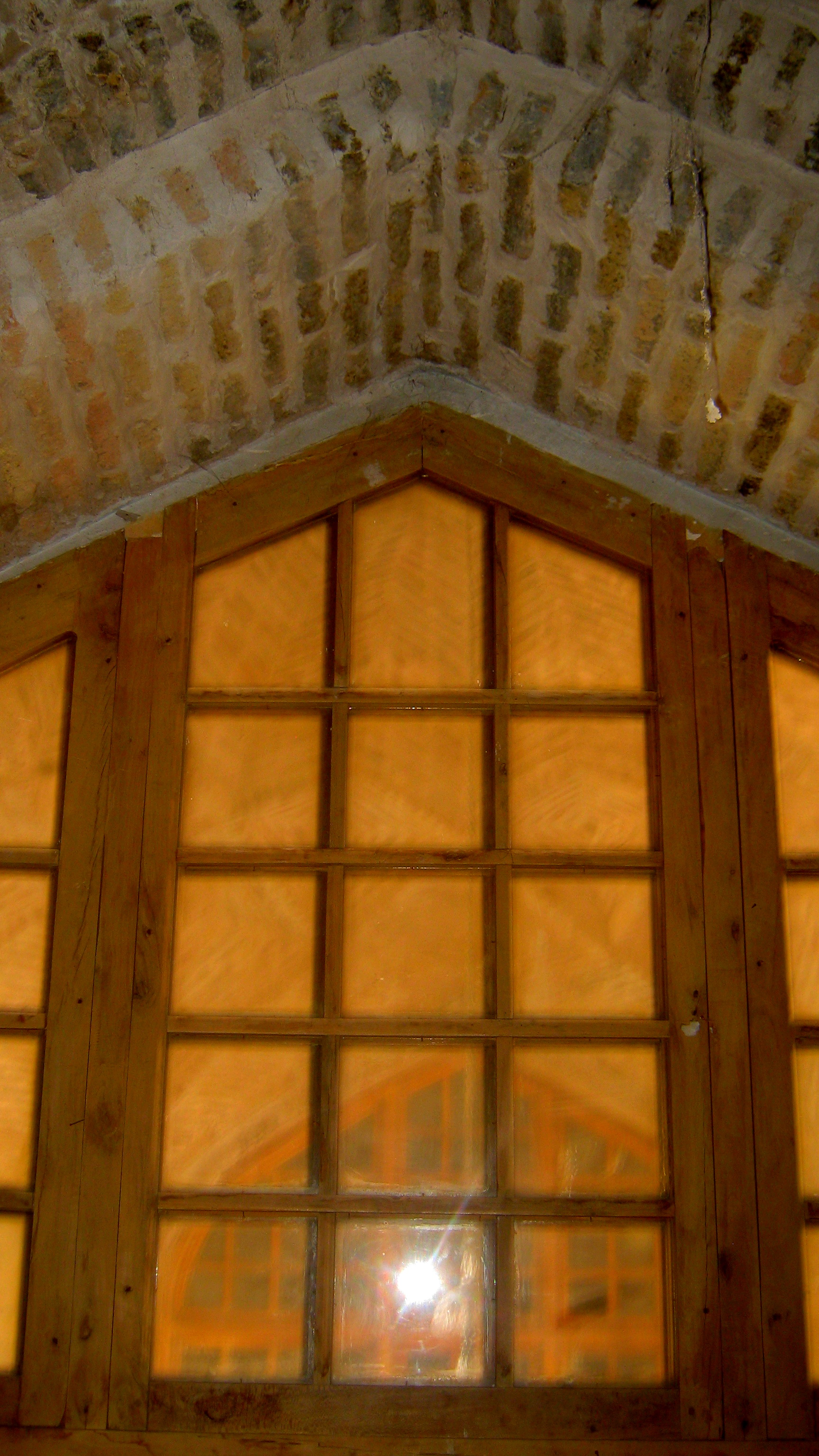

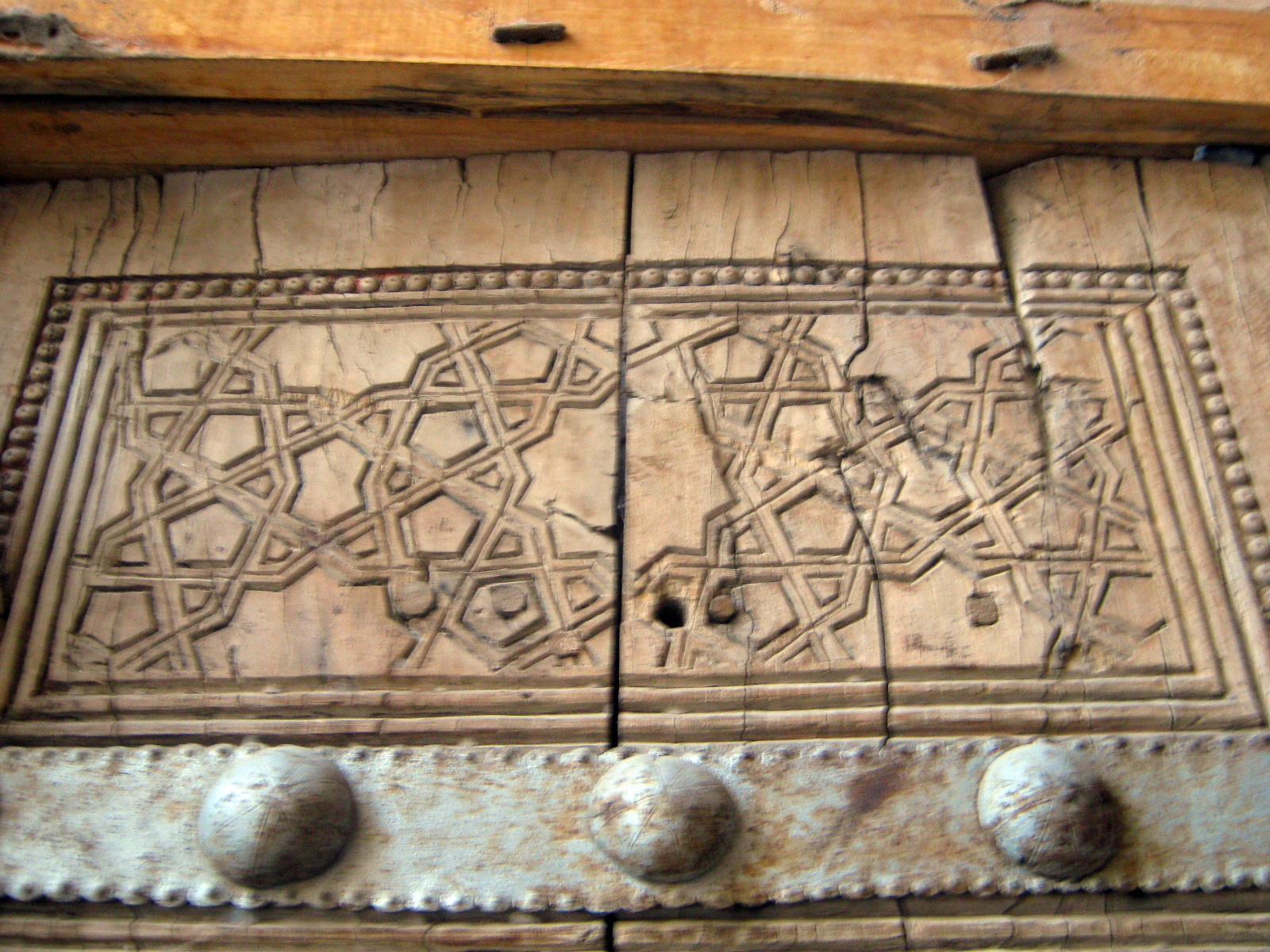

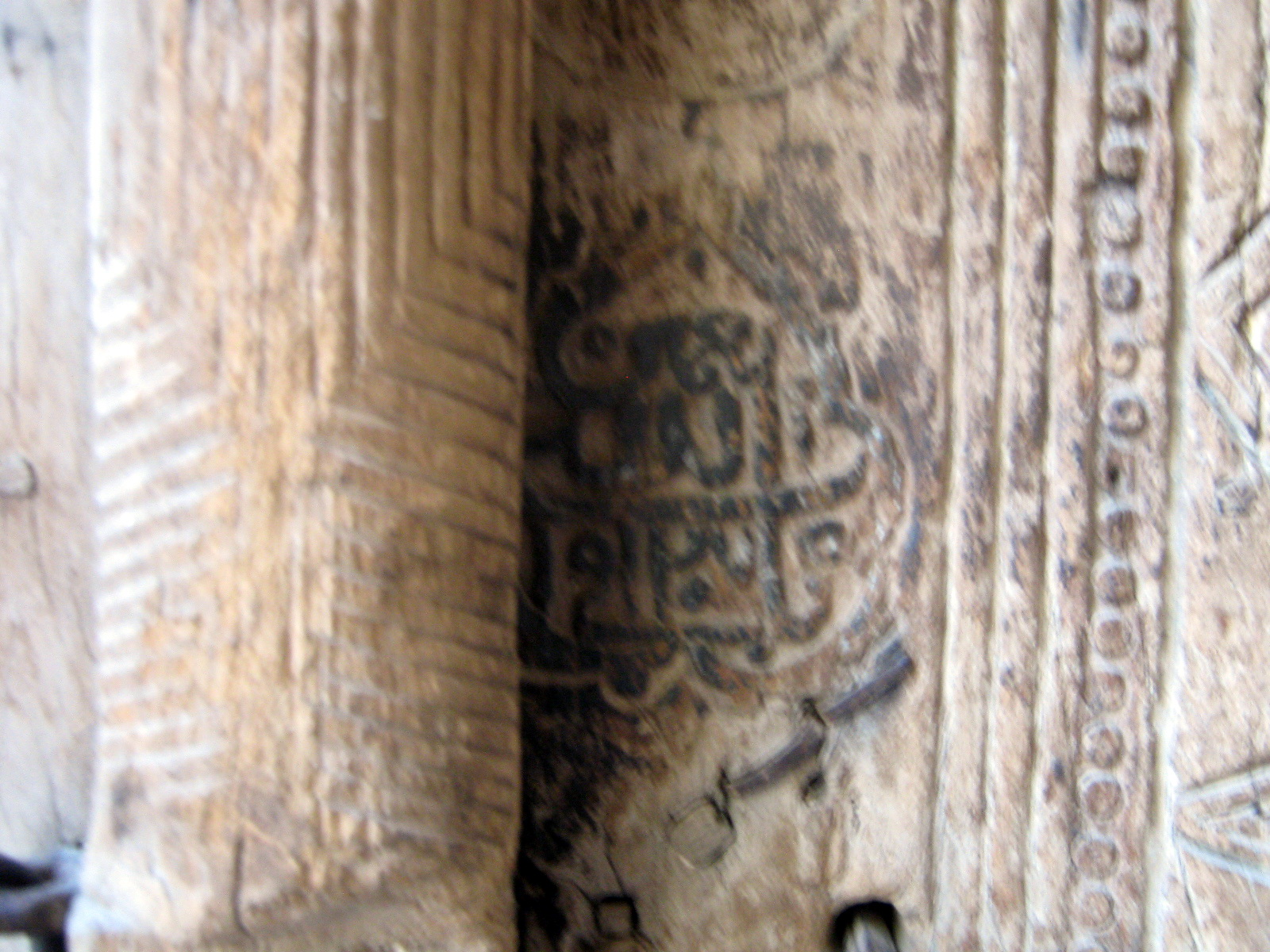

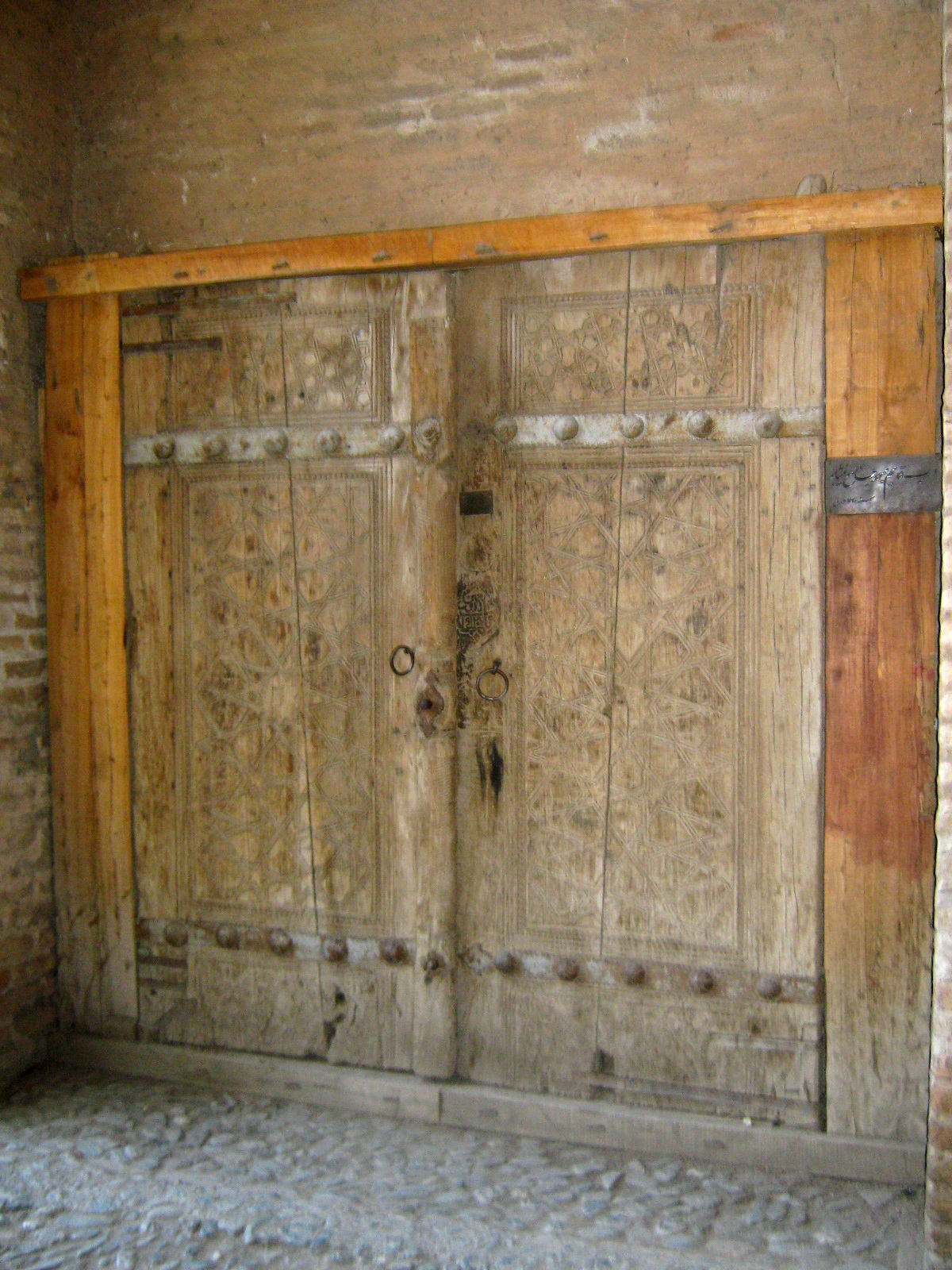

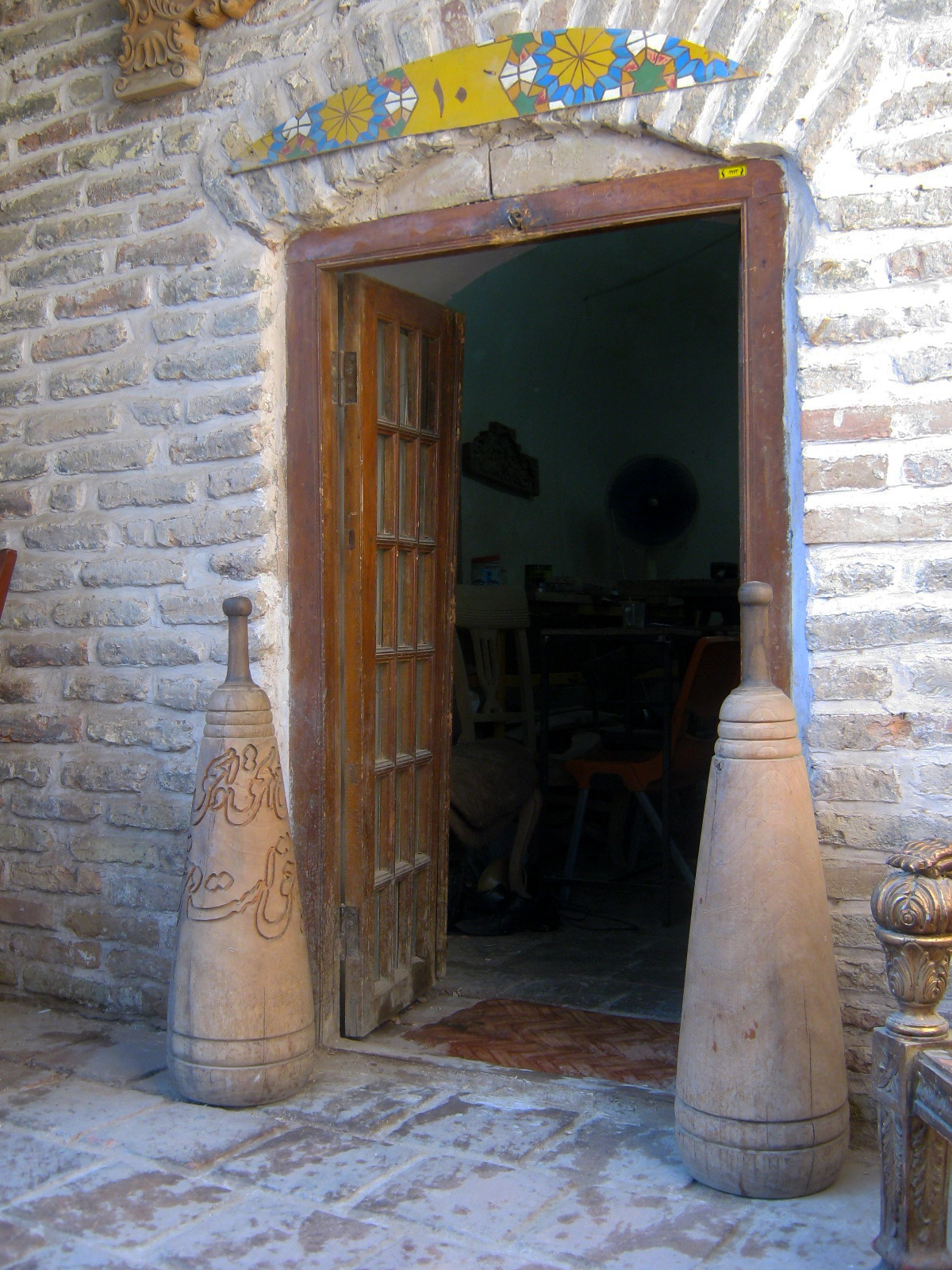

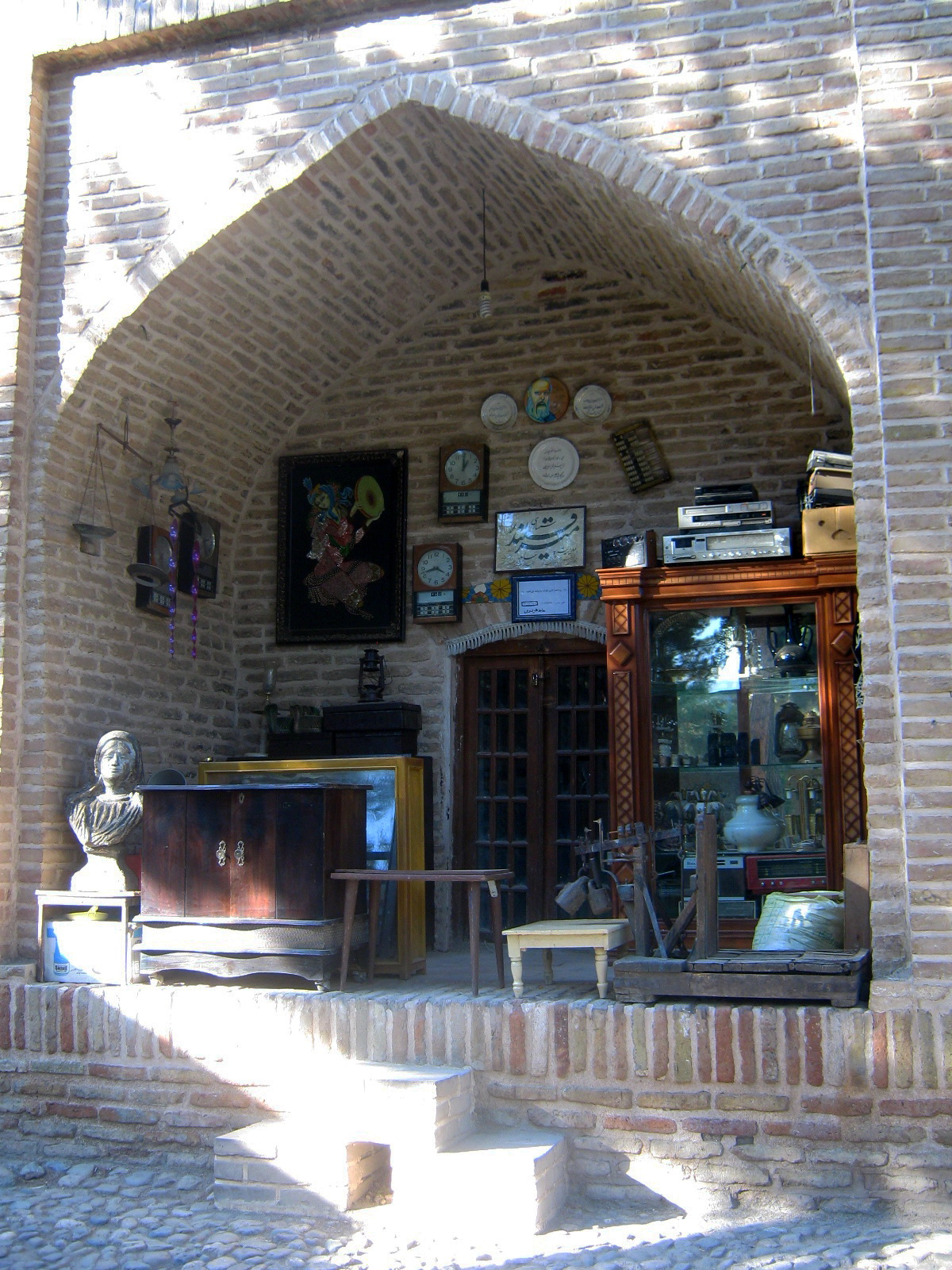

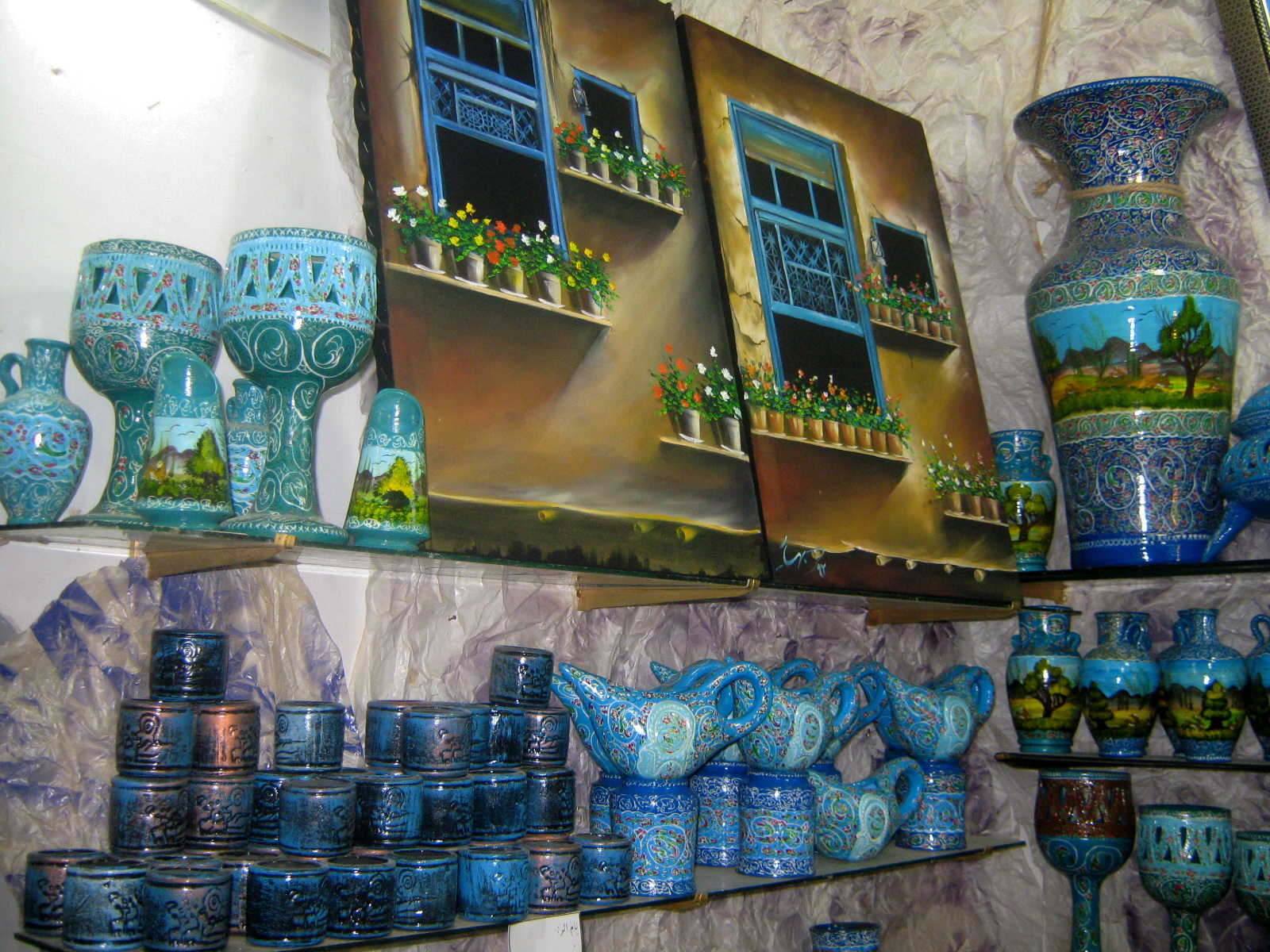

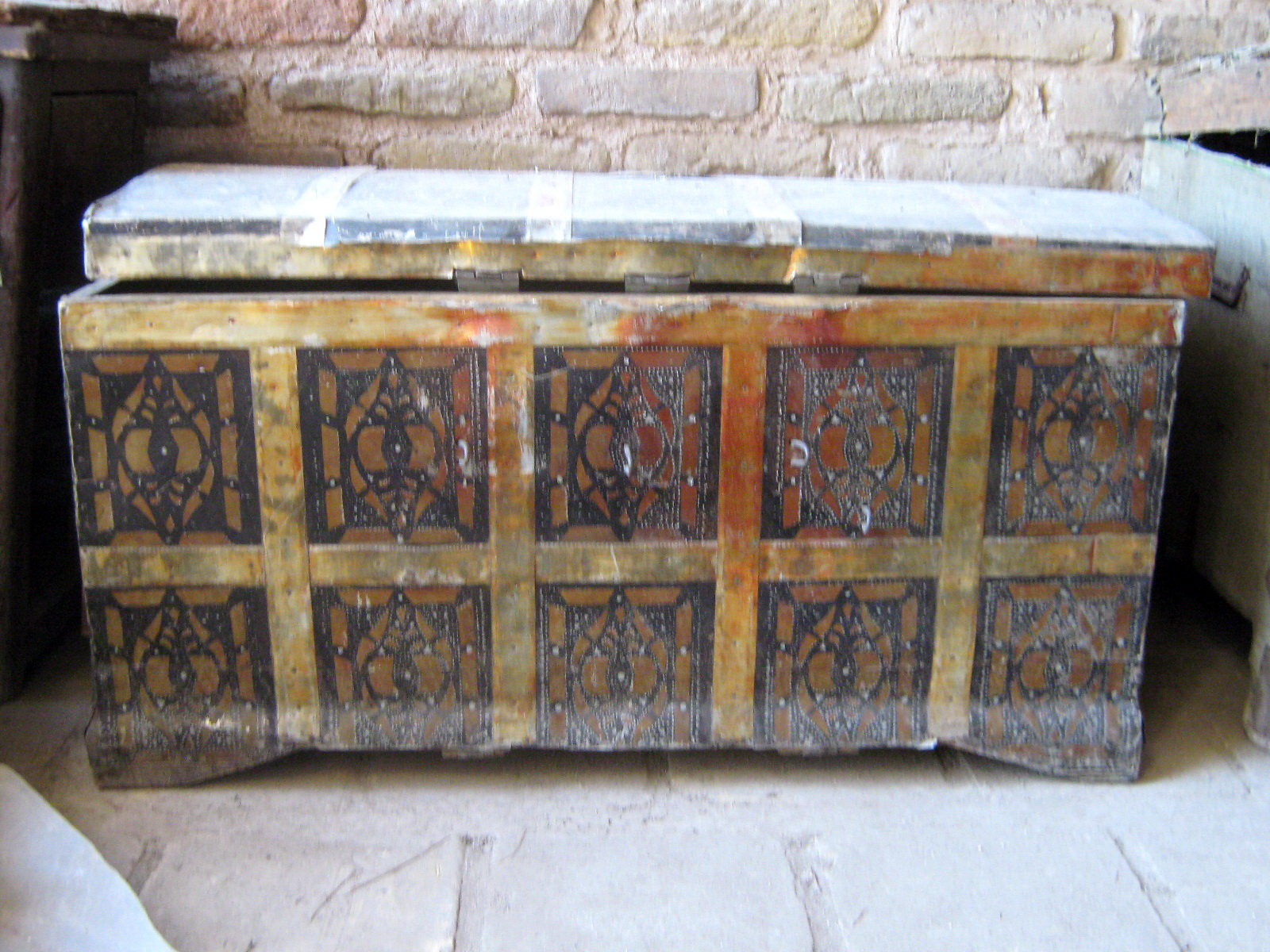

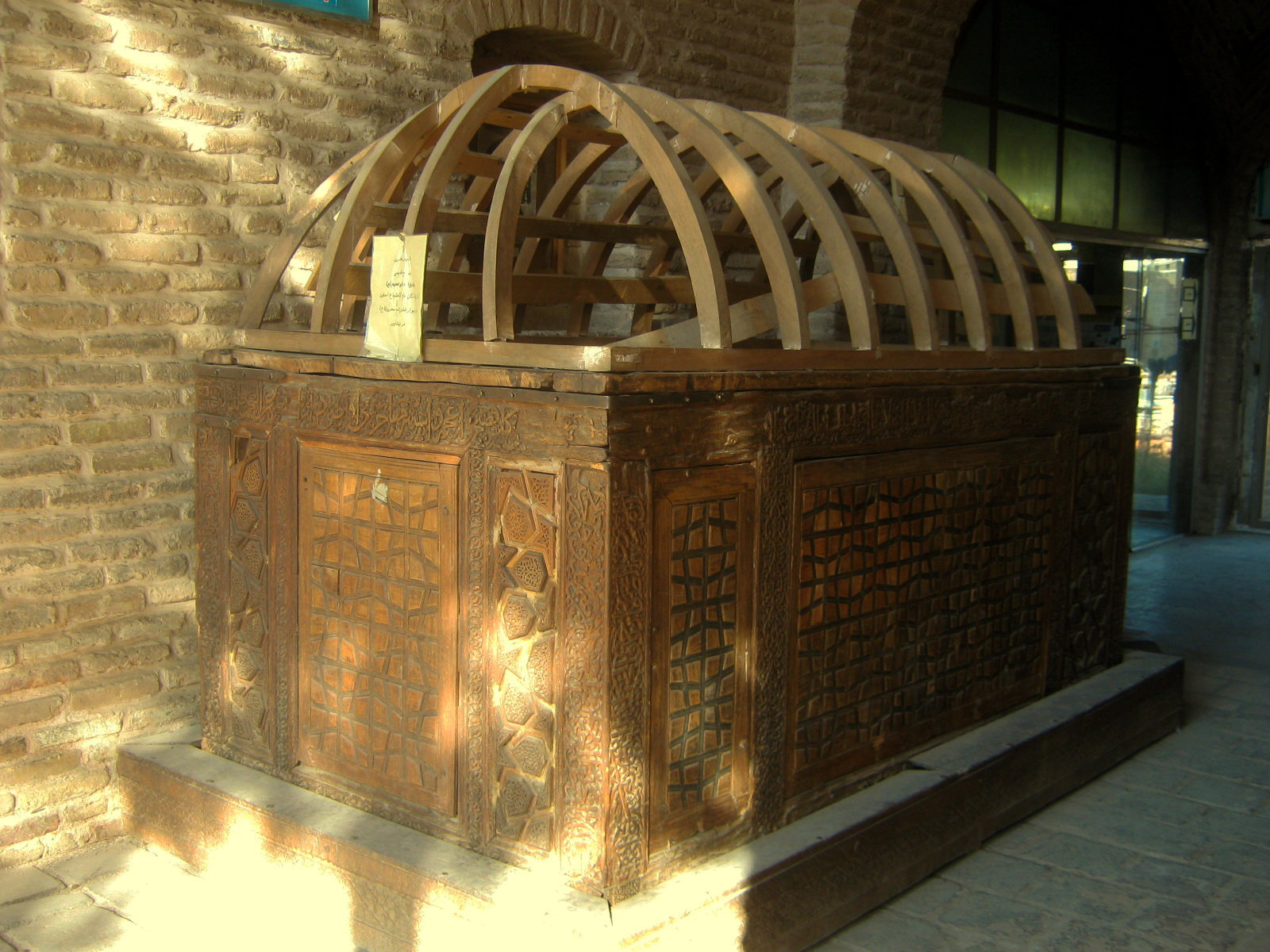

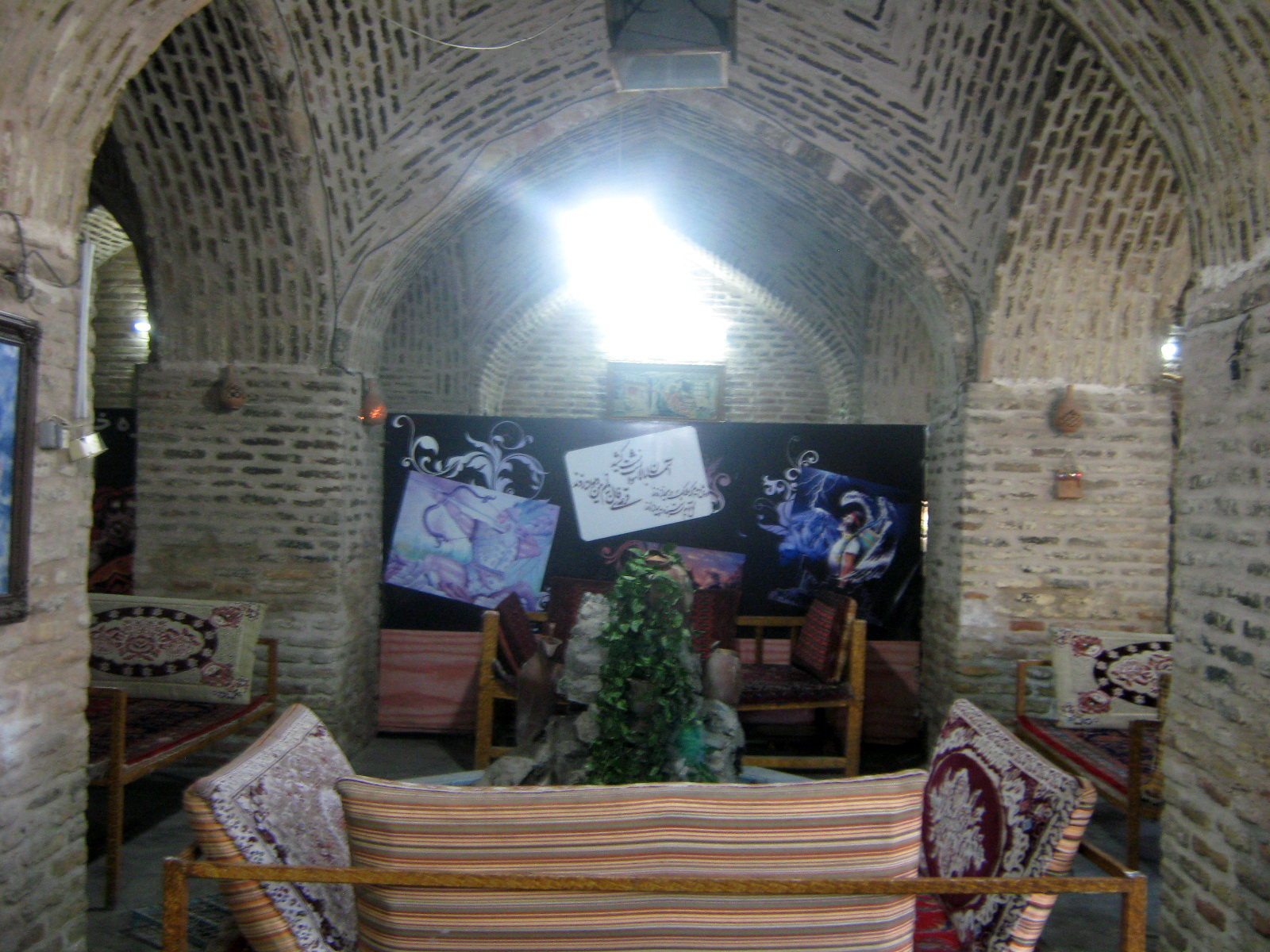

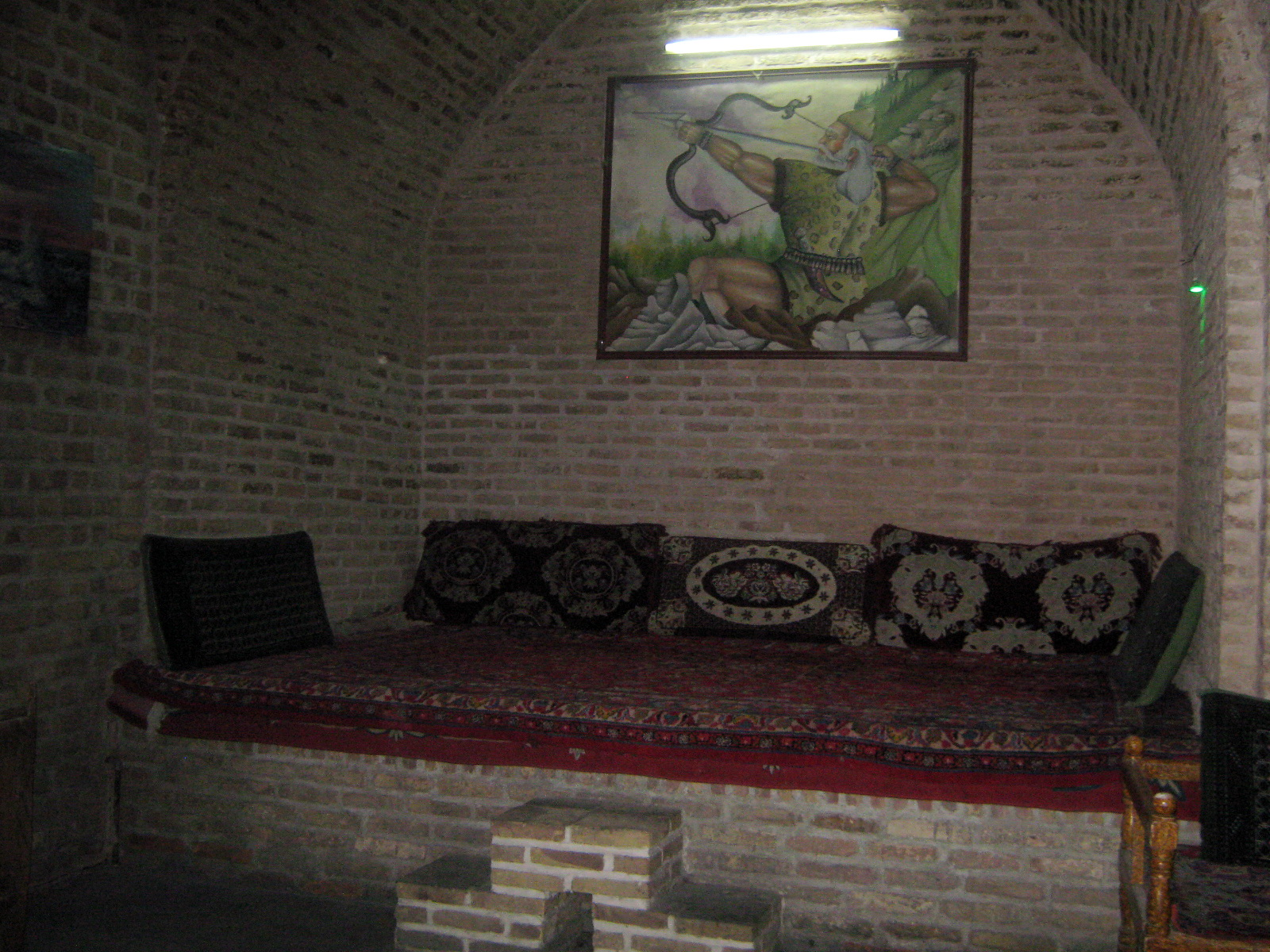

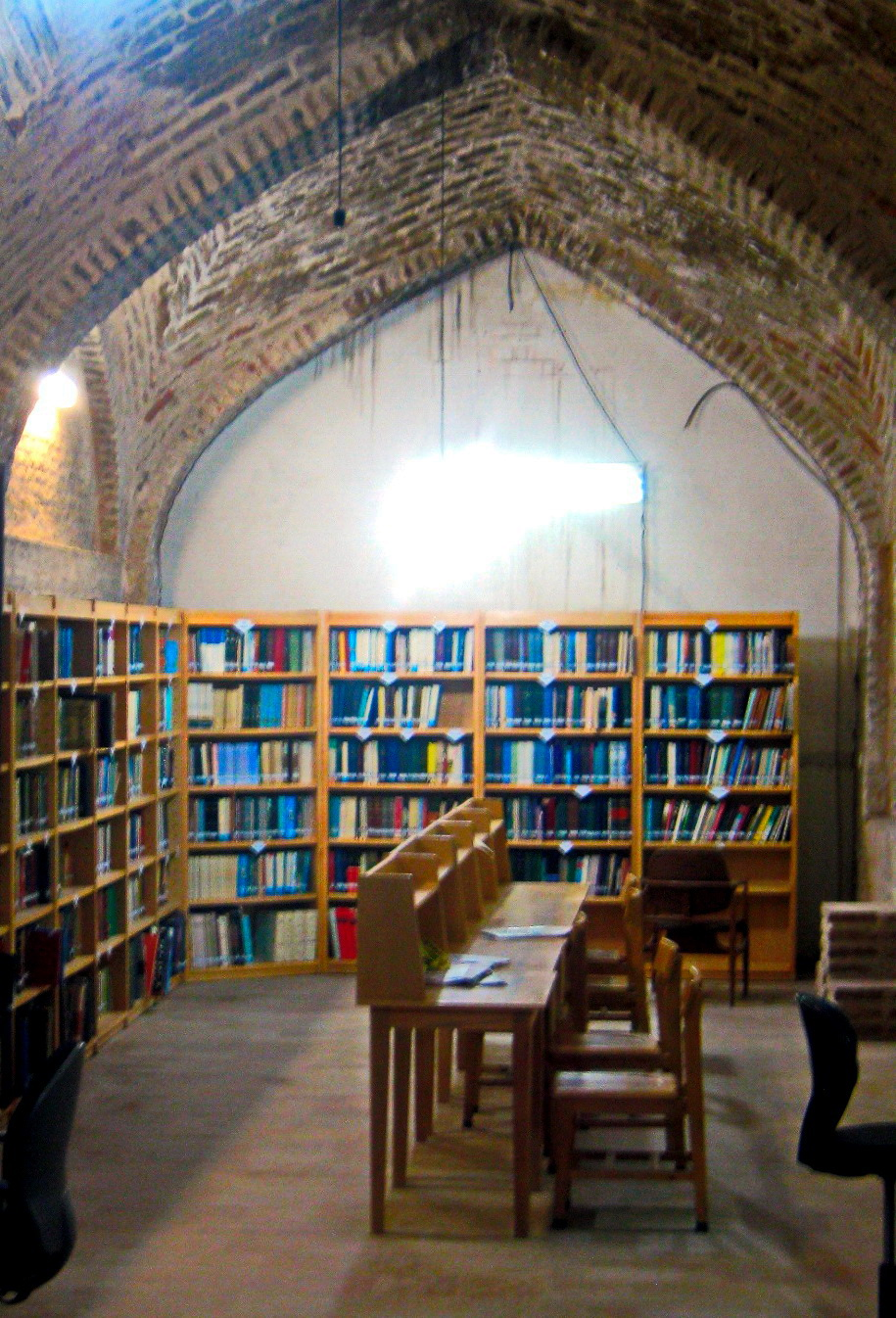
