= Roofed Bazaar of Nishapur =

Roofed Bazar of Nishapur
- بازار سرپوش نیشابور
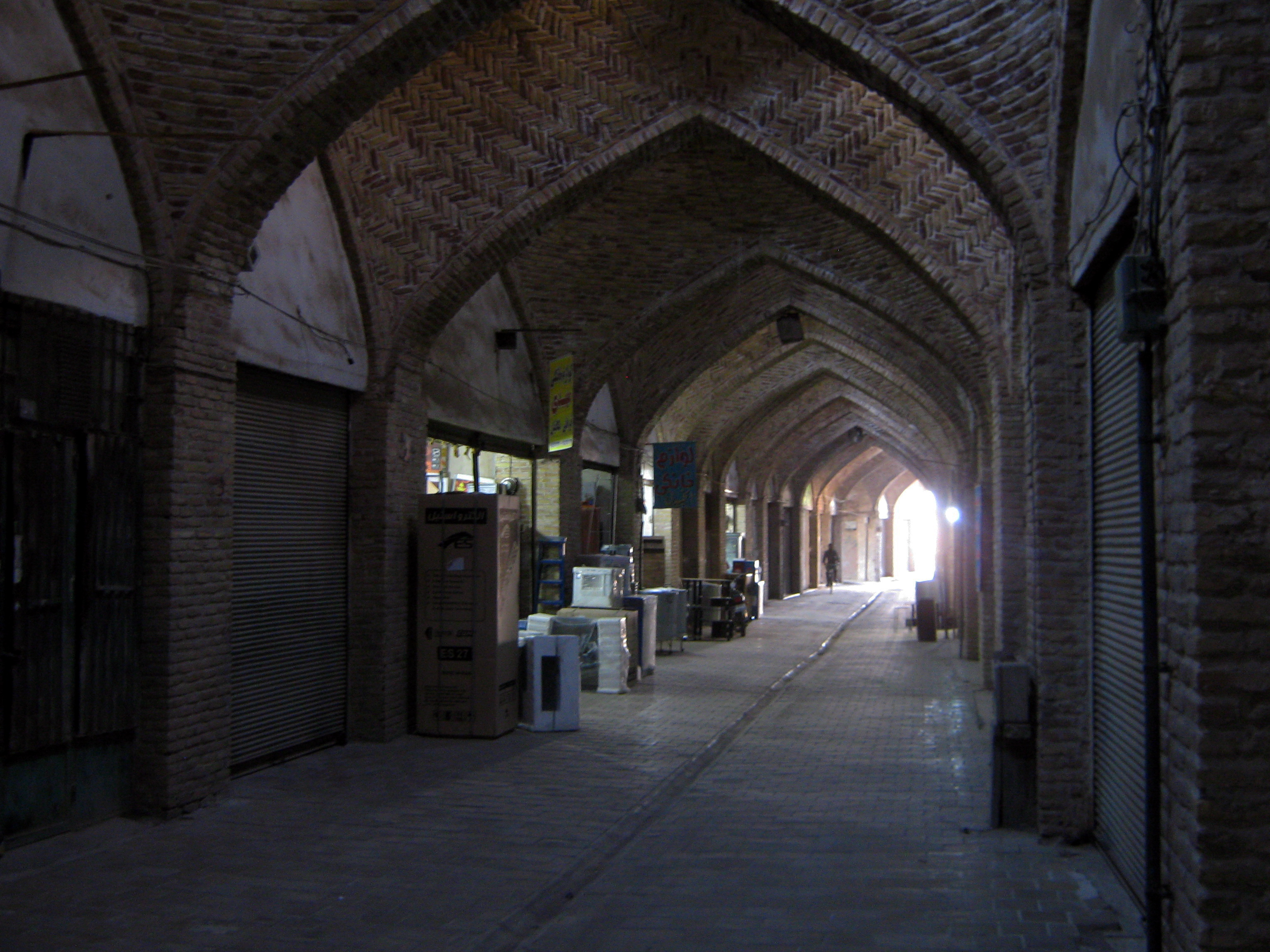
- Interactive map of the Roofed Bazar of Nishapur area

General information
- Status: Under reconstruction and repair by Ministry of Cultural Heritage, Handicrafts and Tourism of Iran but open to the public
- Type: Roofed Bazar
- Architectural style: Persian architecture (Safavid Iran)
- Location: Nishapur, Razavi Khorasan Province, Iran
- Elevation: ?

Roofed Bazaar of Nishapur (Persian: بازار سرپوش نیشابور) is a historical roofed Bazaar dating back to the Safavid Persia in Nishapur, Razavi Khorasan province of Iran. Many of its parts have been unfortunately destroyed and only 750 meters of it remain. There is a current effort made by the MCHT to reconstruct and repair this bazaar. This bazaar is located on the Imam Khomeini street of Nishapur. Its reconstruction was started in the year 1998. This Bazaar is now part of the national heritage list of Iran with the registration number of 6739.

== Gallery ==
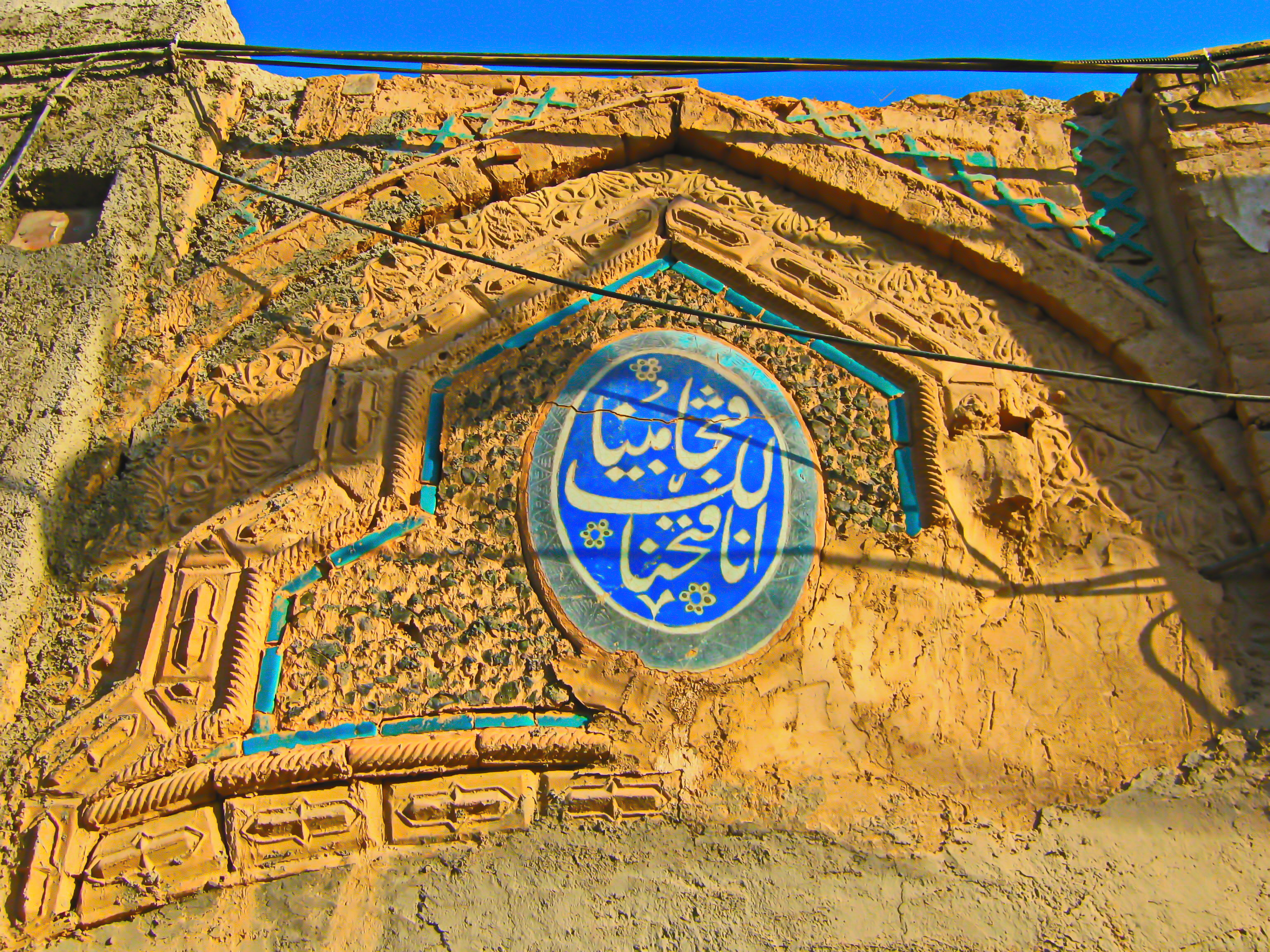
Portal of an old store.

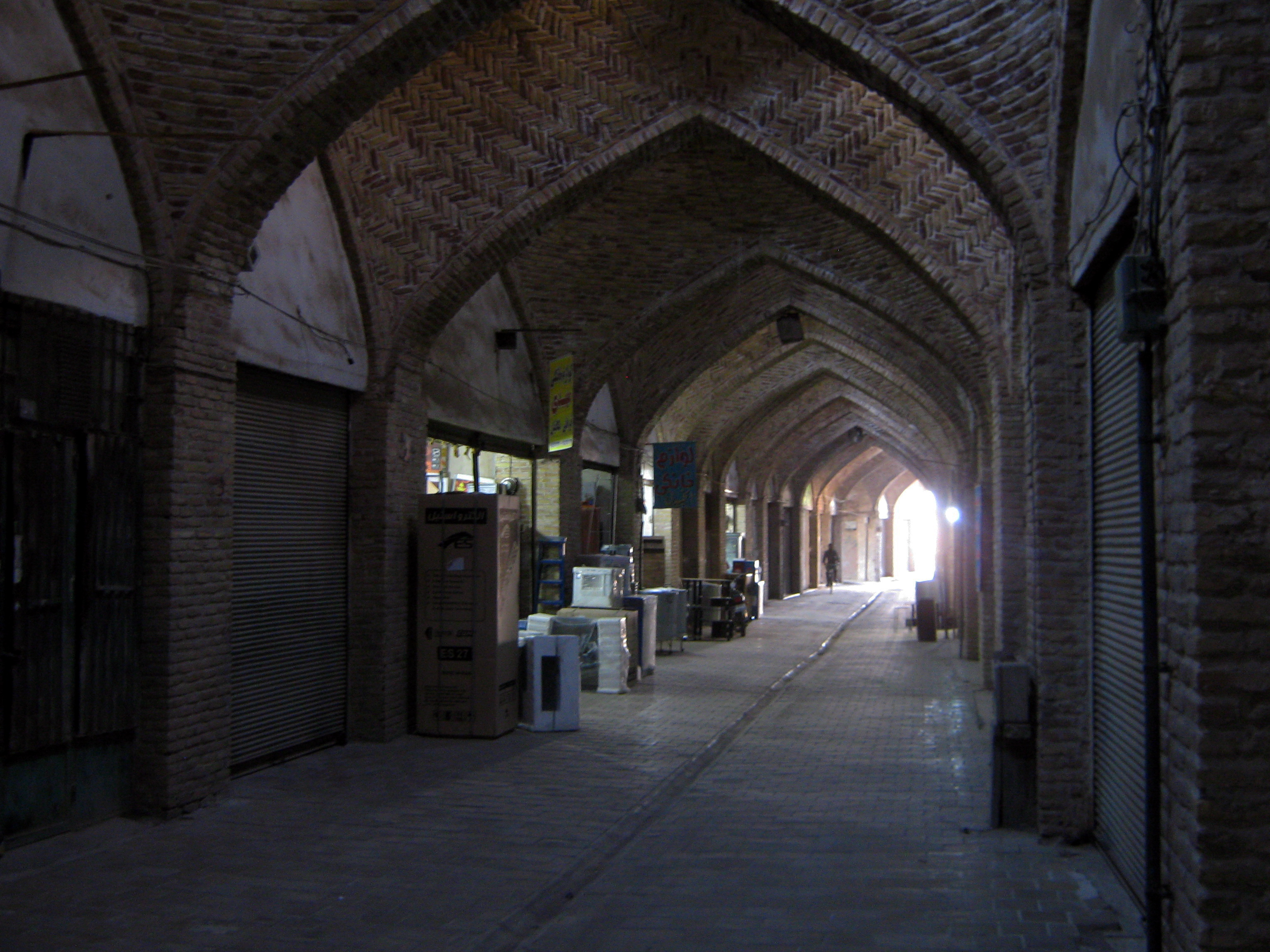

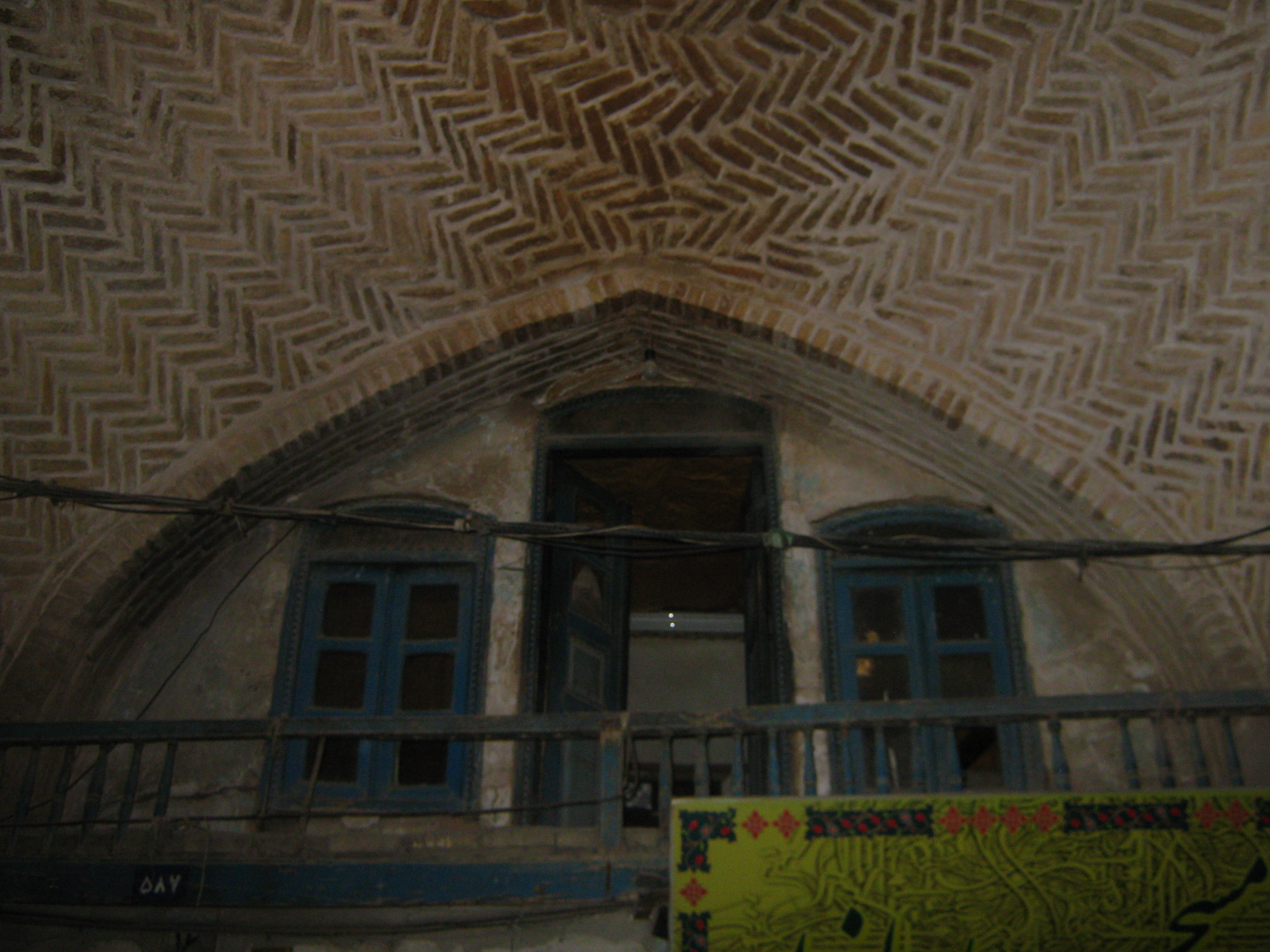

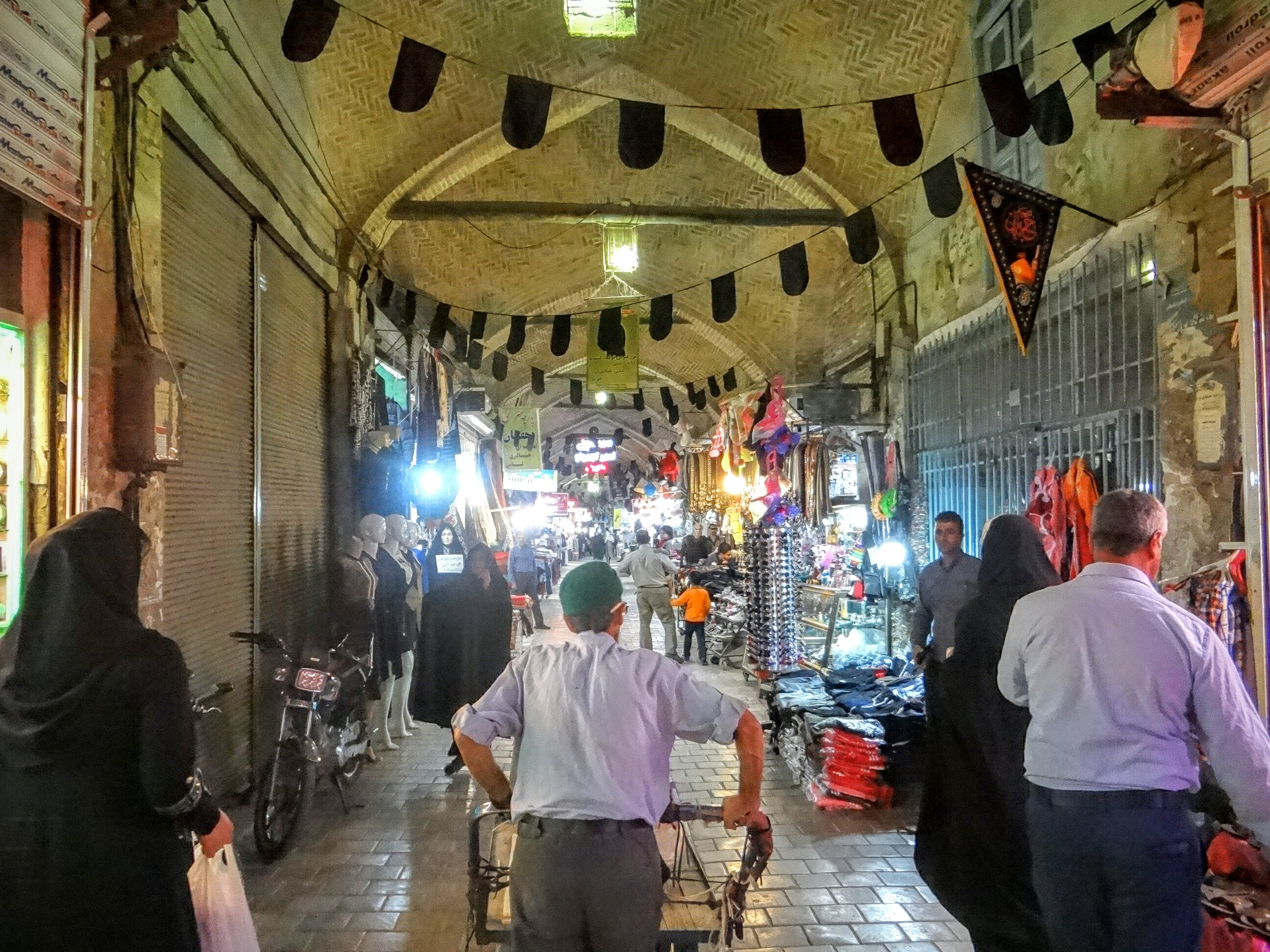

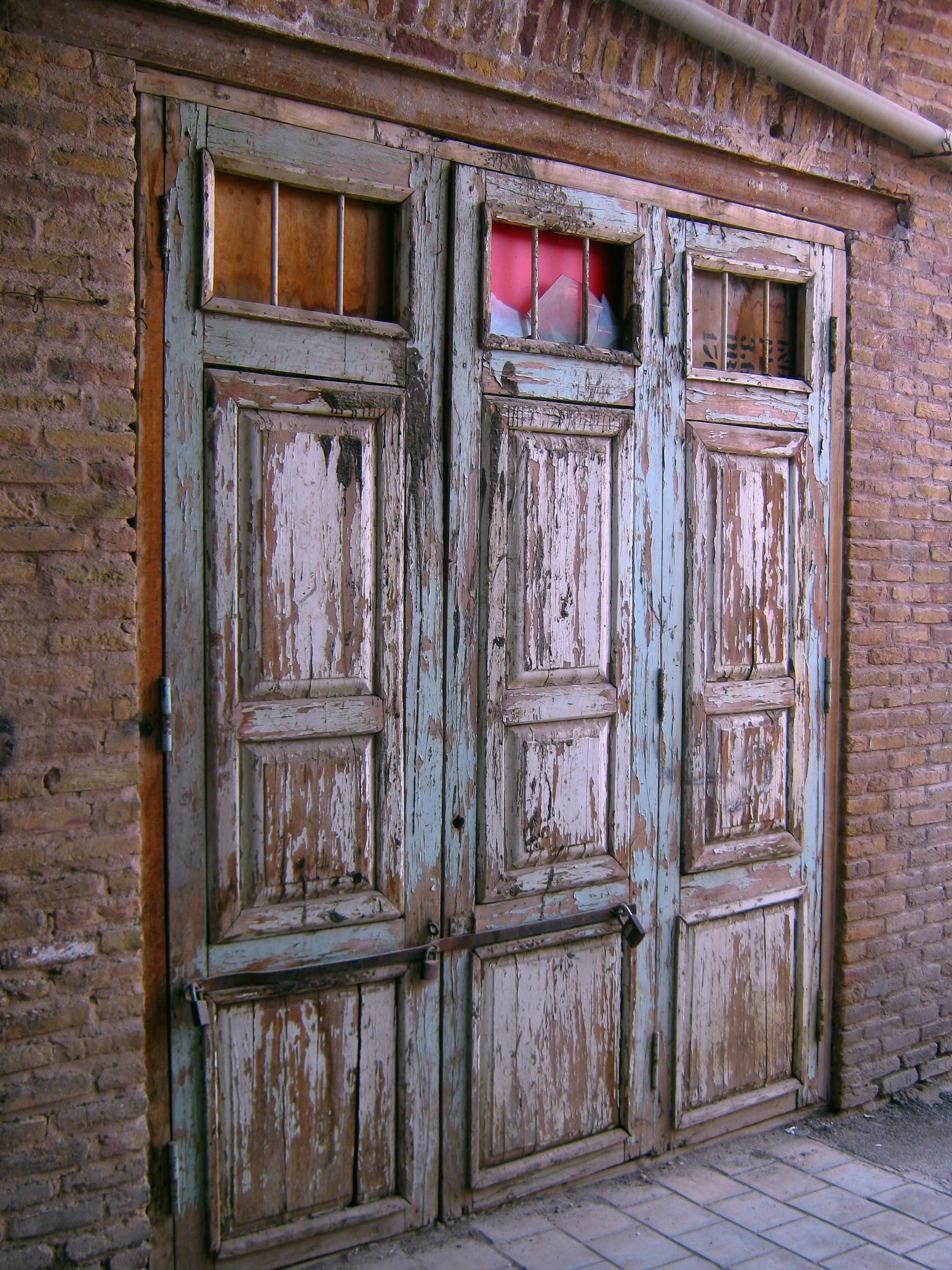

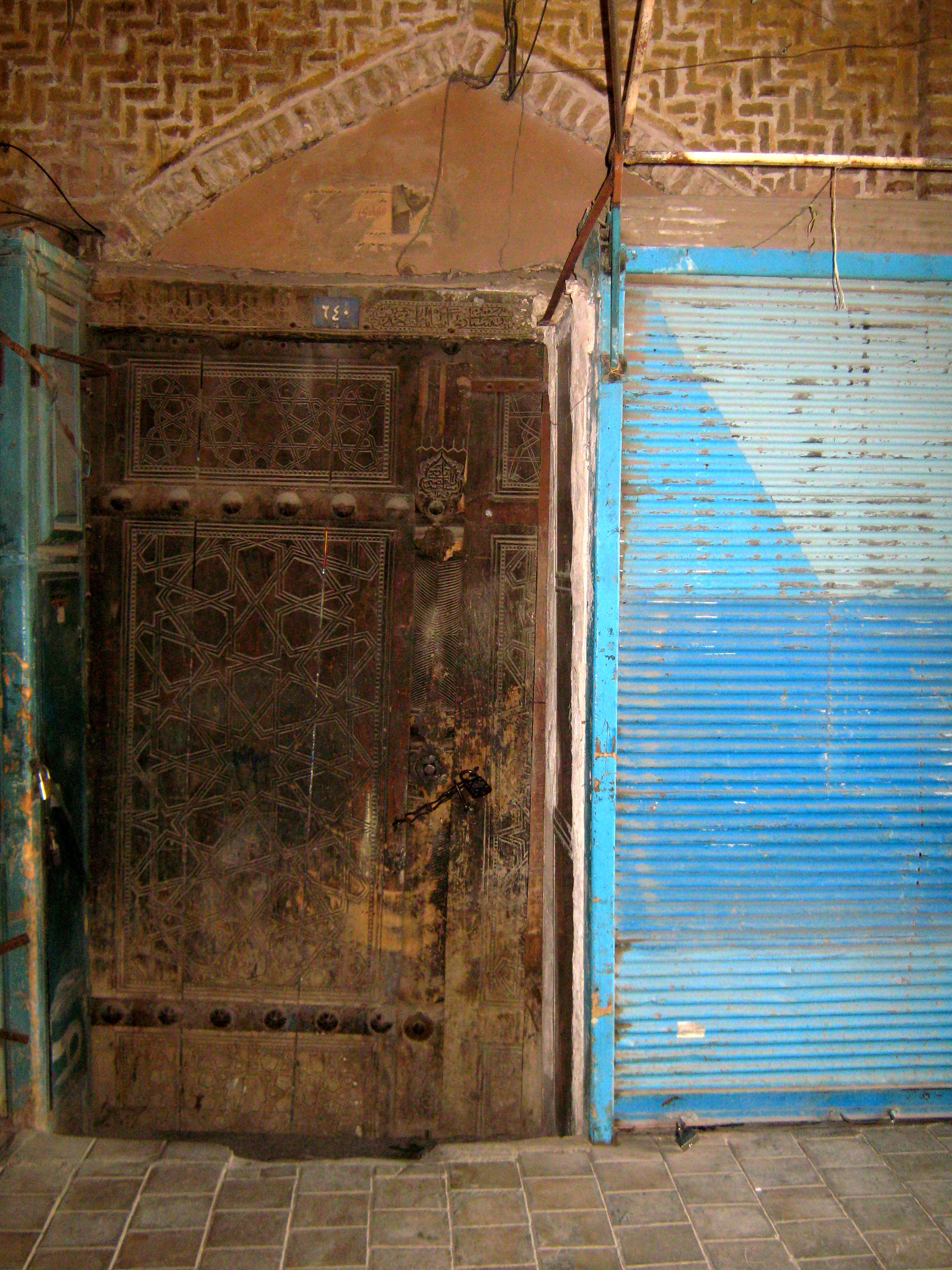

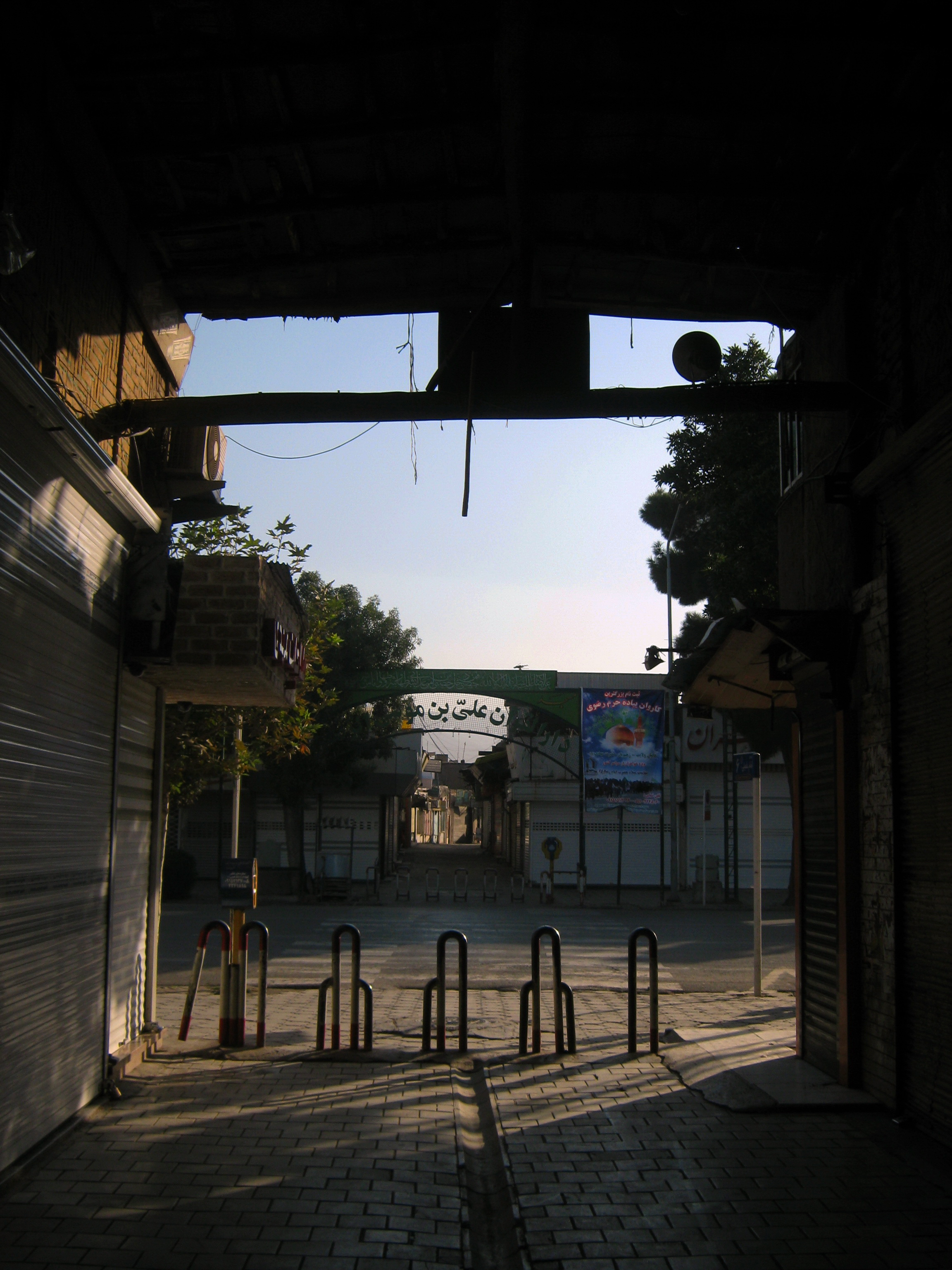

== See also ==
- Greater Khorasan
- Nishapur
