= Saeedi Garden =

Coordinates: 36°12′40.932″N 58°46′49.353″E

Saeedi Garden (Persian: باغ سعیدی, Romanized as Bāgh-e-Saeedi) is a historical garden with an area of 4 hectares located in Nishapur, Iran.

The garden was built in the late Qajar dynasty and early Pahlavi period.
