= Biar Aqueduct =

Ancient Roman aqueduct in Israel

- Location within Levant
- 31°39′41″N 35°09′54″E
- Type: Roman aqueduct / Hydraulic engineering
- Periods: Classical antiquity, Roman, Byzantine, British Mandate
- Cultures: Judean, Roman, Byzantine, British
- Satellite of: Roman Judea
- Location: Wadi el-Biyar, south of Bethlehem
- Region: Judea / West Bank
- Part of: Jerusalem Ancient Water Supply System

History
- Built: mid-1st century C.E. (renovated 2nd century C.E.)
- Built by: Pontius Pilate (attributed via modern radiometric dating)
- Abandoned: 1967 (completely decommissioned)

Site notes
- Material: Rock-cut channels, ashlar stone blocks, waterproof hydraulic mortar
- Height: Includes vertical shafts up to 30 m deep
- Length: c. 5 km (3.1 mi)
- Excavation dates: Multi-period studies; fully mapped and radiometrically surveyed in 2021
- Archaeologists: Kfar Etzion Field School researchers
- Condition: Partially intact (accessible underground tunnels open to hikers)
- Management: Israel Nature and Parks Authority / Gush Etzion tourism
- Public access: Yes (popular seasonal wet hiking route)

The Biar Aqueduct, or Wadi el-Biyar Aqueduct, is an ancient aqueduct in the northern Hebron Hills (Gush Etzion area), south of Jerusalem, that formed part of the city's historic water-supply system. Traditional attribution places its construction under Herod the Great (37–4 BC), but radiocarbon dating of its plasters indicates a mid-first-century CE build with second-century renovations associated with Aelia Capitolina, although it is possible that the entire system dates exclusively to the second century. The two-stage option might place its construction under the governorship of Pontius Pilate (AD 26–36). Sections were refurbished under the British Mandate in 1924 and remained in service until 1967.

== History ==
The Biar Aqueduct includes a 2.8 km tunnel with vertical shafts approximately every 40 meters, as well as open channels. It operated intermittently from the Second Temple period until the 20th century and was finally decommissioned in 1967. Its water sources included the Biar Spring, Arrub Springs, and others near Solomon's Pools.

Parts of the Biar (Wadi el-Biyar) aqueduct system were refurbished by the British during the Mandate period—most notably around 1924—enabling water from Solomon's Pools to continue supplying Jerusalem's Old City until approximately 1967. Additionally, records indicate that under the Mandate the Arrub aqueduct was decommissioned and replaced by a modern iron pipeline.

== Today ==
The aqueduct is accessible to visitors through guided tours organized by the Gush Etzion Development Company, including walking in the ancient water tunnels. The official Gush Etzion tourism site similarly notes that "a watery, enjoyable hike awaits you in the underground tunnel" of the aqueduct, advising visitors to bring a flashlight, water shoes, and change of clothes.

== See also ==
- Jerusalem during the Second Temple period
- Qanat, Iranian aqueduct technology applied here by Romans
