= Gadara Aqueduct =

Former Roman aqueduct

Coordinates: 32.6808°N 35.8691°E

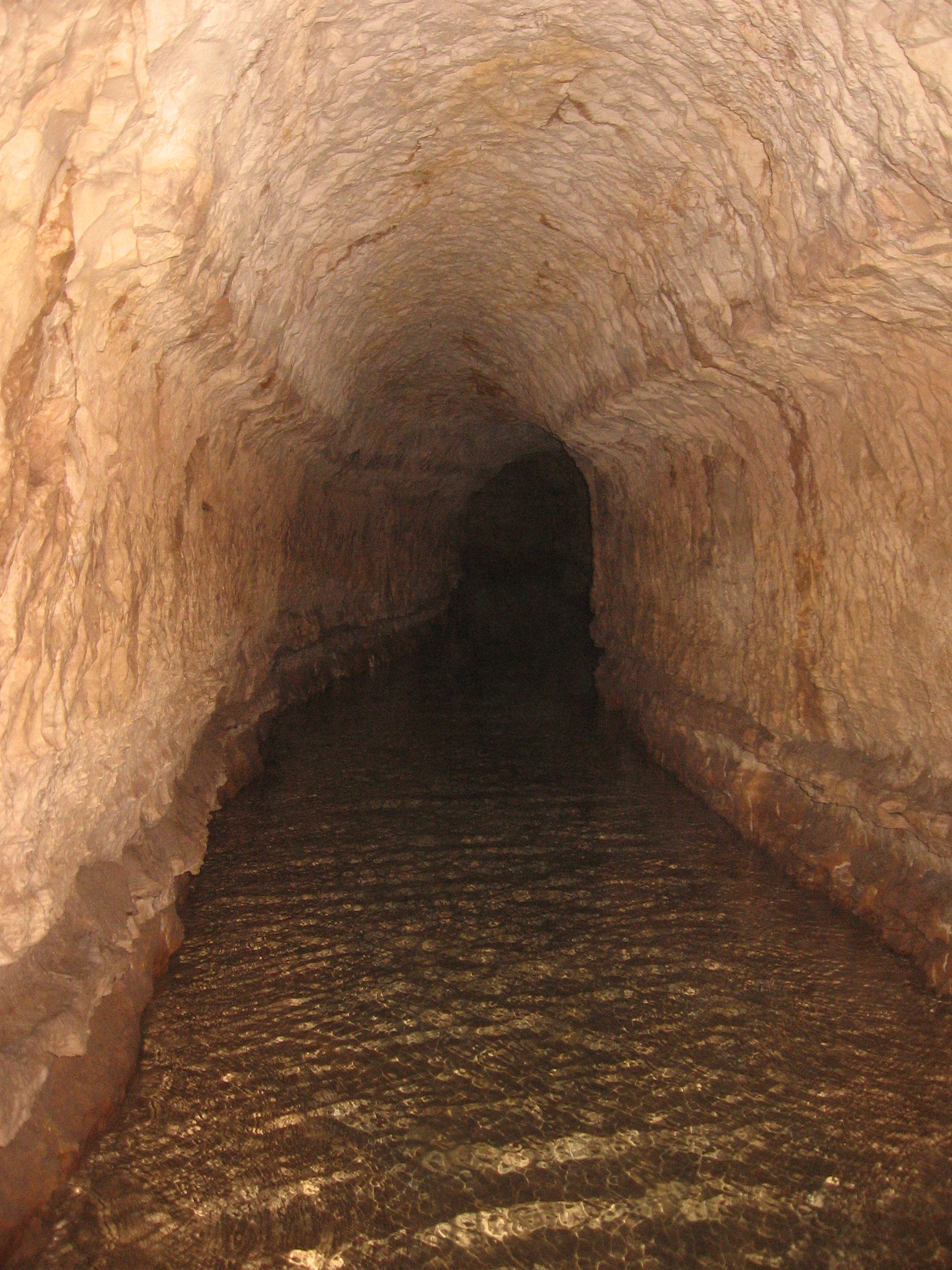
Flooded section of the Qanat Fir'aun

The Gadara Aqueduct, also called Qanatir Fir'awn or Qanat Fir'aun (Pharaoh's Watercourse), was a Roman aqueduct supplying water for some of the cities of the Decapolis. It serviced Adraha (known today as Dera'a in Syria), Abila (at Wadi Queilebh in Jordan), and Gadara (modern-day Umm Qais in Jordan). The aqueduct has the longest known tunnel of the Classical era.

== Description ==
There was one section of more than 106 kilometres (66 mi), constructed with qanat technology. In this special case, nearly all the shafts were diagonal at 45–60 degrees, with stairs to the real water channel inside the mountain. The line went along steep slopes and collected water from sources around the area. The first Western visitor who rode along the "Kanatir" was U. J. Seetzen in 1805.

There are gradients of 0.3 metres per mile (0.2 m/km; 1.0 ft/mi) for the tunnel section. The aqueduct starts at a Roman dam in Dilli (al-Dali, also spelled el-Dilli, Eldili, ad-Dili, c. 7 km north of the sub-district residence town of Al-Shaykh Maskin, Izra District, Daraa Governorate, Syria). From there, this part of the aqueduct line crosses several wadis via five-to-ten-metre-high (15–35 ft) bridges. During the last few decades, more than three kilometres (2 mi) of the remaining substructions were demolished on the plains between Dilli and Dera'a near the Syria-Jordan border.

East of Adraha was a 35-metre (115 ft) bridge. The remains of the bridge now can be found on the ground of the new Al Saad Dam located at the eastern suburbs of Dera'a. After a junction point with a side channel from the Muzayrib lake, the underground aqueduct begins. Three water systems have been found near Gadara (Umm Qais). The first and second were built with qanat technology, and the third was built as a channel along a street. It is believed that all three systems were used, but each at a different period.

== Claims of underground city ==
Beneath the classical city of Adraha was a supposed underground city, which was said to be connected to the Gadara Aqueduct and described as such by Johann Gottfried Wetzstein in 1860 and Gottlieb Schumacher in 1896. The inhabitants of the city are said to have collected water by jars on ropes, from the underground channel. Today, however, there is no sign of the underground city, with modern commentary suggesting Wetzstein and Schumacher misinterpreted features they encountered during excavations.

== See also ==
- Ancient Roman technology
- Roman engineering
- List of aqueducts in the Roman Empire
- List of Roman aqueducts by date

== Bibliography ==
- Döring, Mathias, "Qanat Firaun. 106 km langer unterirdischer Aquädukt im nordjordanischen Bergland, Schriften der Deutschen Wasserhistorischen Gesellschaft, Vol. 10 (2008), pp. 1–16
- Döring, Mathias, "Wasser für die Dekapolis - Jordanisches Bergland birgt längsten bisher bekannten Aquädukttunnel. Ein Zwischenbericht. Deutsches Archäologisches Institut, Forschungs Cluster 2, Berlin 2012, 225-243.
- Döring, Mathias, "Wasser für die Dekapolis. Römische Fernwasserleitung in Syrien und Jordanien. Deutsche Wasserhistorische Gesellschaft Vol. S 12, 2016, pp. 1–248, ISBN 978-3-9815362-3-2.
- Döring, Mathias, "Roman Water Systems in Northern Jordan", Proceedings of the 12th International Congress on the History of Water Management and Hydraulic Engineering in the Mediterranean Region (Ephesus, Oct. 2004), Österreichisches Archäologisches Institut, Sonderschriften, Vol. 42 (Leuven, 2006), pp. 237–243
