= Suranga =

Traditional water management system in Kerala and Karnataka, south India

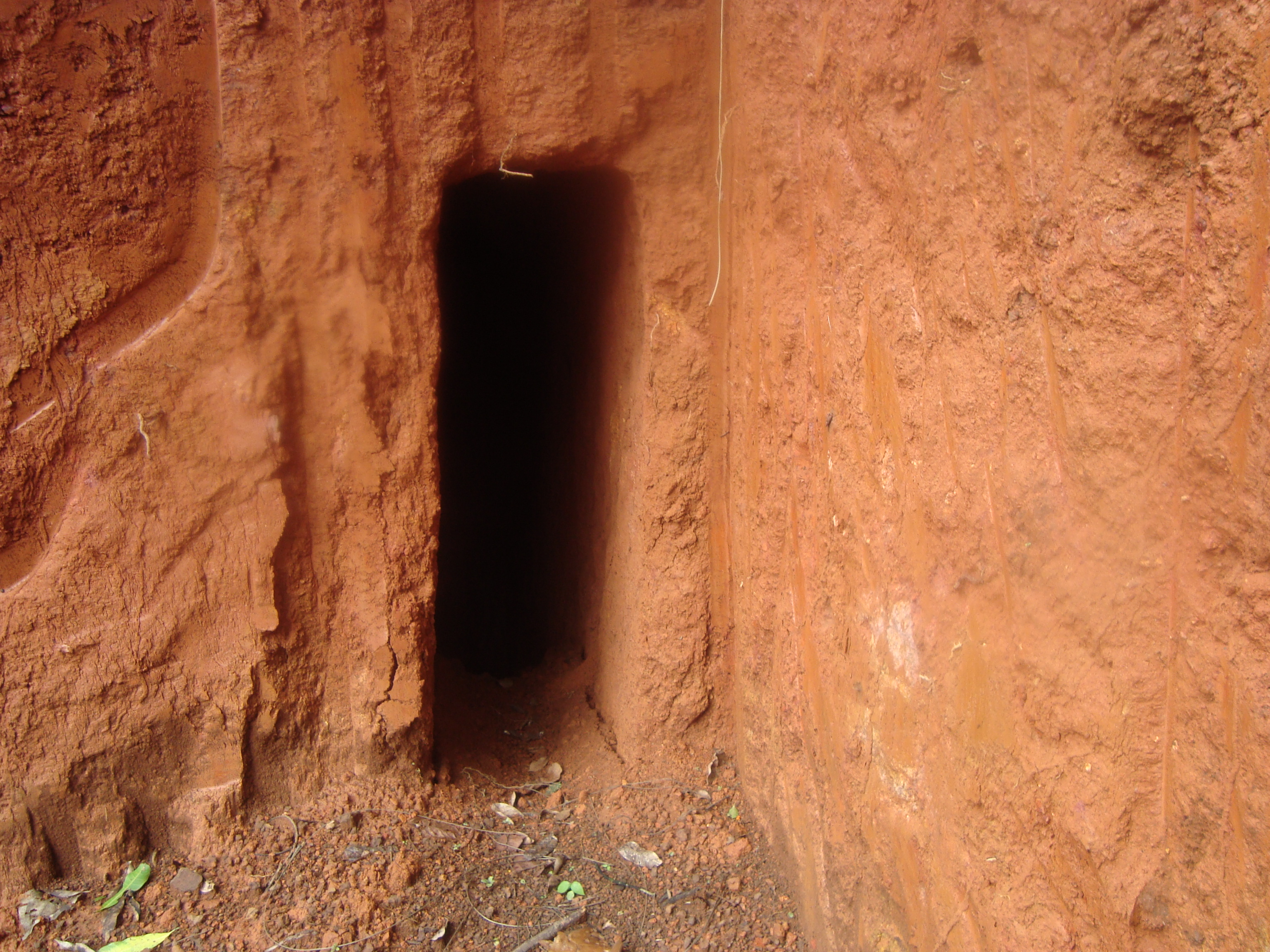
Face of a Surangam

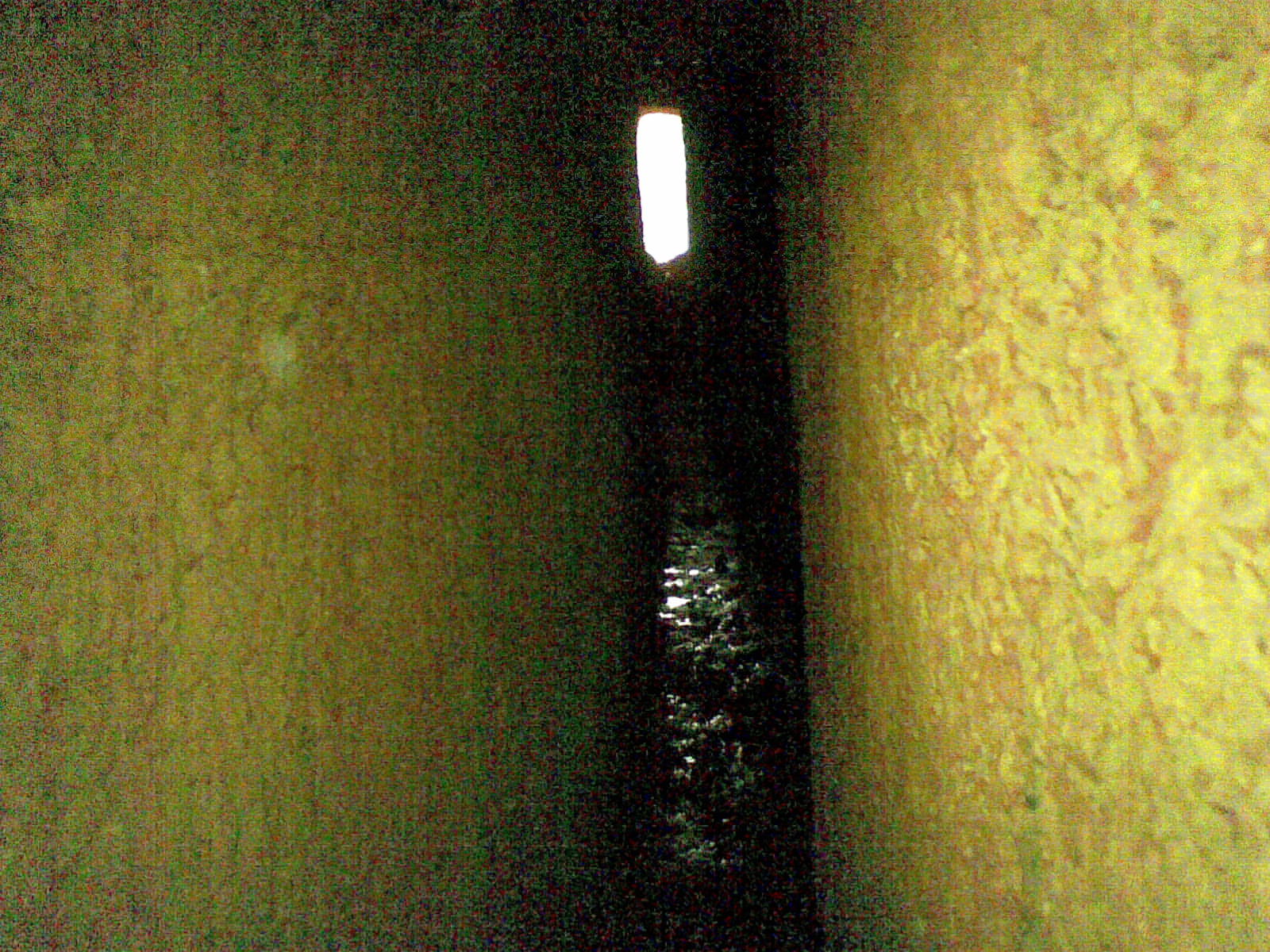
View of Suranga from inside, towards its face

Suranga (also Surangam or thurangam) (English: Tunnel well) is a traditional water management system used to provide a reliable supply of water for human settlements and irrigation in Kasargod district of Kerala and Dakshin Kannada district of Karnataka, India. A suranga is basically a horizontal tunnel dug in the slope of a laterite hill for about 30 metres (98 ft) to 40 metres (130 ft), which uses gravitational force for extraction of the underground water and collect into a storage tank. As both the areas are covered by uneven and steep laterite hill which makes boring of traditional bore well hard and expensive, surangas are considered as a relatively cheap option.

== History ==
While the exact origin of the surangas in the area is not known, the surangas which are still in use are not older than a century. Similar structures, known as qanats can still be seen in parts of Iran. It is believed that, the traders who used to travel along the Silk Route had spread the technique of the construction of quanat from ancient Persia to India, China, Saudi Arabia, North Africa, Spain, Cyprus and Canary Islands. Most of the surangas in the area were constructed during the 1950s. According to studies, there are around 5000 surangas in Kasargod district of Kerala and Dakshin Kannada district of Karnataka.

== Types ==
There are two types of surangas - 1) dug in the hillocks with the help of galvazined pipes in a horizontal direction, from where the water percolates out (known as addaboru in Kannada) and 2) horizontally dug tunnel like structures which are as high as the height of a man, from where the water percolates out and collects into a water tank.

== Construction ==
The construction of surangas are carried out by people who have this indigenous knowledge, which is passed on from one generation to another. Detection of the water flow is done by taking into account the slope and elevation, growth of certain hydrophilic plants like, dhoopada mara (Vateria indica), basari mara (Ficus virens) and uppalige mara (Macranga indica), termite mounds and the texture of the soil. The flow of the water can also be detected with the help of skilled workers, who press their ear to the soil at night to understand the direction and presence of the flow. Water dowsing and use of witchcraft is also prevalent for detection of the water flow.

Once the flow is detected, the digging of the surangas is carried out by manual labourers or by the villages themselves with the help of improvised digging tools like pick axes and wedges. The digging takes places mainly during the dry season, in between February and May, to prevent collapsing of wall due to presence of moisture in the soil. The tunnels are generally rectangular or dome-shaped with an optimal height and width which allows a man to work and pass comfortably. The tunnels are made with a downward slope to use the gravitational force for collection of the water percolating outside. During construction, lining of walls is provided to prevent collapsing of wall due to loose or soft soil. While an average suranga is 26 metres (85 ft) meters deep, surangas up to 250 metres (820 ft) meters deep have also been recorded. Air shafts are constructed in longer surangas to supply fresh air and to expel poisonous gases.

The surangas can be independent or can be connected with each other. The water can then be collected by using a temporary small barrier or dam with mud, which then can flow through a plastic or bamboo pipe into a storage pit or tank. After collection of the water in the storage pit, the water is taken to the farms by siphon methods, by creating aqueducts, or by drip or other irrigation methods.

== See also ==
- Aryk – Irrigation canal of central Asia
- Acequia – Community-operated watercourse
- Qanat – Water supply system developed in ancient Iran
- Aflaj Irrigation Systems of Oman
- History of water supply and sanitation
- Menara gardens – Public garden in Marrakesh, Morocco
- Traditional water sources of Persian antiquity – Aspect of Iranian history
- Shushtar Historical Hydraulic System – Irrigation system in Shushtar, Iran (Iran)
- Tank cascade system – Ancient irrigation system in Sri Lanka
- Johad – Traditional rainwater-storage wetland in India (Northern India)
- Subak - Irrigation system of Bali
