= Qanats of Ghasabeh =

Part of the Persian Qanat, Iranian national heritage site

Qanats of Gonabad
- Kariz e Kay Khosrow
- Location within Iran
- 34°19′49″N 58°41′02″E
- Type: Settlement
- Periods: Achaemenid Empire
- Cultures: Persian
- Location: Gonabad, Razavi Khorasan Province, Iran
- Region: gonabad1506
- Part of: 1506

History
- Built: 6th century BCE
- Built by: Cyrus the Great, Kai Khosrow

Site notes
- Material: Clay
- Condition: In use
- Management: Iranian Government
- Public access: Open

UNESCO World Heritage Site
- Official name: Qasabeh Gonabad
- Type: Cultural
- Criteria: (iii)(iv)
- Designated: 2016 (40th session)
- Reference no.: 1506-001
- Region: Asia-Pacific

The Qanats of Ghasabeh (Persian: قنات قصبه), also called Kariz e Kay Khosrow, is one of the world's oldest and largest networks of qanats (underground aqueducts). Built between 700 and 500 BCE by the Achaemenid Empire in what is now Gonabad, Razavi Khorasan Province, Iran, the complex contains 427 water wells with a total length of 33,113 metres (20.575 mi). The site was first added to UNESCO's list of tentative World Heritage Sites in 2007, then officially inscribed in 2016, collectively with several other qanats, as "The Persian Qanat".

== History ==
Qanat Ghasabe has a link to the legendary king of Iran Kay Khosrow. Many historical and geographical sources mention two main wars in Gonabad region during the time of Kay Khosrow. Davazdah Rokh war and Froad war had been mentioned in Shahnameh. According to Nasir Khusraw, the qanat of Gonabad was built by the order of Kay Khosrow

=== Persian period ===
The use of water clocks in Iran, especially in the Qanats of Gonabad and Kariz Zibad, dates back to 500 BCE. Later they were also used to determine the exact holy days of pre-Islamic religions, such as the Nowruz, Chelah, or Yaldā—the shortest, longest, and equal-length days and nights of the year. The water clock, or Fenjaan, was the most accurate and commonly used timekeeping device for calculating the amount or the time that a farmer must take water from the Qanats of Gonabad until it was replaced by more accurate current clocks.

It was an Achaemenid ruling that in case someone succeeded in constructing a qanat and bringing groundwater to the surface in order to cultivate land, or in renovating an abandoned qanat, the tax he was supposed to pay the government would be waived not only for him but also for his successors for up to five generations. Following Darius' order, Silaks, the naval commander of the Persian army, and Khenombiz, the royal architect, managed to construct a qanat in the oasis of Kharagha in Egypt. Beadnell believes that qanat construction dates back to two distinct periods: they were first constructed by the Persianse, and later the Romans dug other qanats during their reign in Egypt from 30 BCE to 395 AD. The magnificent temple built in this area during Darius' reign shows that there was a considerable population depending on the water of qanats; Ragerz has estimated this population to be 10,000 people. The most reliable document confirming the existence of qanats at this time was written by Polybius, who states that: "the streams are running down from everywhere at the base of Alborz mountain, and people have transferred too much water from a long distance through some subterranean canals by spending much cost and labor".

=== Islamic period ===
In Iran, the advent of Islam, which coincided with the overthrow of the Sassanid dynasty, brought about a profound change in religious, political, social and cultural structures. But the qanats stayed intact, because the economic infrastructure was of great importance to the Arabs. As an instance, M. Lombard reports that the Moslem clerics who lived during the Abbasid period, such as Abooyoosef Ya’qoob (died 798 AD) stipulated that whoever can bring water to the idle lands in order to cultivate, his tax would be waived and he would be entitled to the lands cultivated. Therefore, this policy did not differ from that of the Achaemenids in not getting any tax from the people who revived abandoned lands.

Apart from the Book of Alghani, which is considered a law booklet focusing on qanat-related rulings based on Islamic principles, there is another book about groundwater written by Karaji in the year 1010. This book, entitled Extraction of Hidden Waters, examines just the technical issues associated with the qanat and tries to answer common questions such as how to construct and repair a qanat, how to find a groundwater supply, how to do leveling, etc. Some of the hydrogeological innovations described in this book were first introduced there. There are some records dating back to that time, signifying their concern about the legal vicinity of qanats. For example, Mohammad bin Hasan quotes Aboo-Hanifeh that in case someone constructs a qanat in abandoned land, someone else can dig another qanat in the same land on the condition that the second qanat is 500 zera' (375 meters) away from the first one.

=== Pahlavi period ===
During the Pahlavi period, the process of qanat construction and maintenance continued. A council that was responsible for the qanats was set up by the government. At that time most of the qanats belonged to landlords. In fact, feudalism was the prevailing system in the rural regions. The peasants were not entitled to the lands they worked on, but were considered only as the users of the lands. They had to pay rent for land and water to the landlords who could afford to finance all the proceedings required to maintain the qanats, for they were relatively wealthy. According to the report of Safi Asfiya, who was in charge of supervising the qanats of Iran in the former regime, in the year 1942 Iran had 40,000 qanats with a total discharge of 600,000 liters per second or 18.2 billion cubic meters per year. In 1961, another report was published revealing that in Iran there were 30,000 qanats of which just 20,000 were still in use, with a total output of 560,000 lit/se or 17.3 billion cubic meters per year. In 1959 a reforme program named as the White Revolution was declared by the former Shah. One of the articles of this program addressed the land reform that let peasants take ownership of part of the landlords' lands. In fact, the land reform meant that the landlords lost their motivation for investing more money in constructing or repairing the qanats which were subject to the Lnd Reform Law. On the other hand, the peasants could not come up with the money to maintain the qanats, so many qanats were gradually abandoned.

In 1963, the Ministry of Water and Electricity was established in order to provide the rural and urban areas of the country with sufficient water and electricity. Later, this Ministry was renamed the Ministry of Energy.

In the year 2000, holding the International Conference on Qanats in Yazd drew a lot of attention to the qanats. In 2005 the Iranian government and UNESCO signed an agreement to set up the International Center on Qanats and Historic Hydraulic Structures (ICQHS) under the auspices of UNESCO. The main mission of this center is the recognition, transfer of knowledge and experiences, promotion of information and capacities with regard to all aspects of qanat technology and related historic hydraulic structures. This mission aims to fulfill sustainable development of water resources and the application of the outcome of the activities in order to preserve historical and cultural values as well as the promotion of the public welfare within the communities whose existence depends on the rational exploitation of the resources and preservation of such historical structures.

=== Ghasabe Qanat of Gonabad ===
The documentary film of the Ghasabe Qanat of Gonabad (70 minutes movie) illustrates the engineering potential of Iranian diggers to dig aqueducts throughout history, explaining its importance. The story of the Ghasabe aqueduct in water supply in desert conditions is illustrated in this movie. By documenting the aqueduct of the Ghasabe Qanat, it has been attempted to illustrate the potential of the Gonabad excavation and its continued importance throughout history. The film is based on the memoirs of many years of travel and residence of French scholar Henri Goblot in the mid-twentieth century and Visit the Iranian aqueducts. This documentary film was produced by radio and television of Khorasan-e-Razavi Province in collaboration with Khorasan-e-Razavi Province Cultural Heritage and Tourism administration; commissioned by UNESCO. And made by Seyedsaeed Aboozarian known as (Payman Ashegh) as Production Manager / Translator and Narrator of French; and Saeed Tavakkolifar as Director.

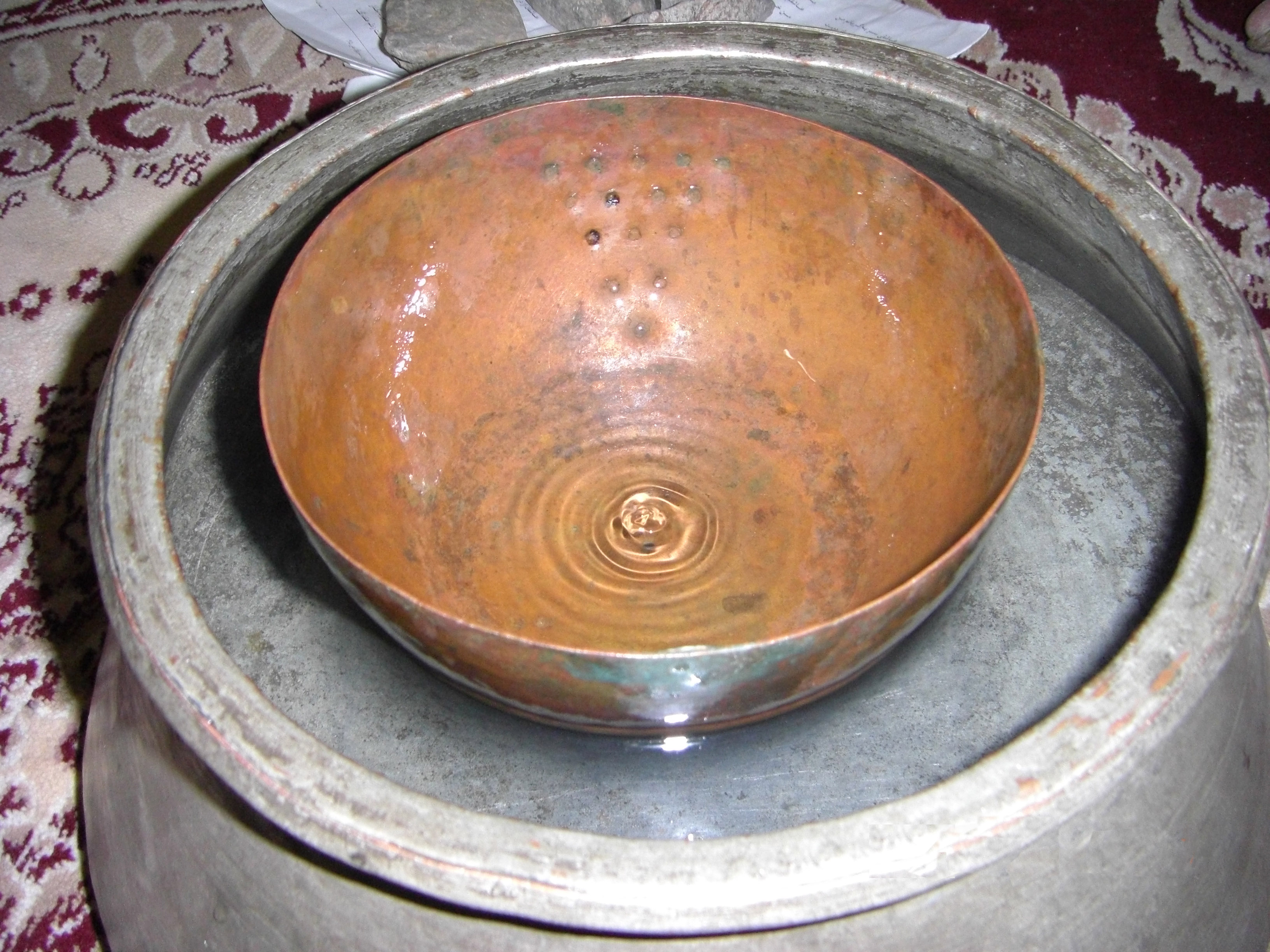
Ancient Persian clock

== Sources ==
- Iranian newspaper farheekhtegan 21/May 2016 No 1949
- Iranian newspaper Mardom salari18Feb 2016 Qantas or kariz in Gonabad
- Qanats and its tools waterclock
- Qanat Gonabad or Kariz Kai Khosrow
- pars documentary
