= Qanats of Baladeh Ferdows =

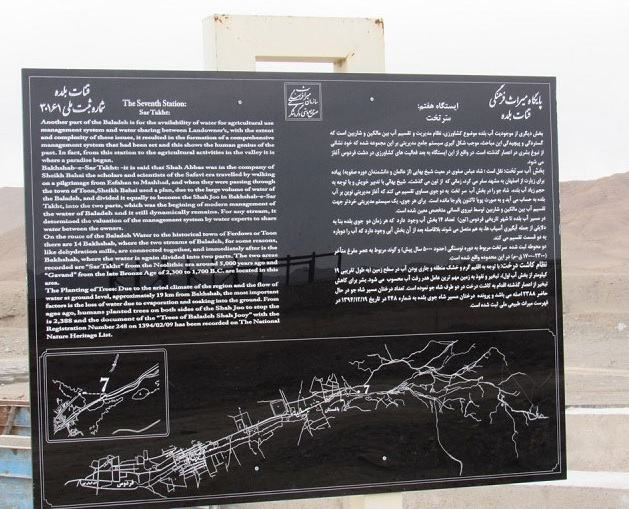
- The Persian Qanat

- Location within Iran
- 34.1355°N 58.37367°E
- Type: Settlement
- Periods: Sasanian Empire
- Cultures: Persian
- Location: Ferdows, South Khorasan Province, Iran

Site notes
- Condition: In use
- Management: Iranian Government
- Public access: Open

UNESCO World Heritage Site
- Criteria: (iii)(iv)
- Designated: 2016 (40th session)
- Reference no.: 1506
- Region: Asia-Pacific

The Qanats of Baladeh Ferdows belongs to the Sasanian Empire and is located in Ferdows.
