= Zibad =

Village in Razavi Khorasan province, Iran

Zibad Persian: زيبَد
- Village
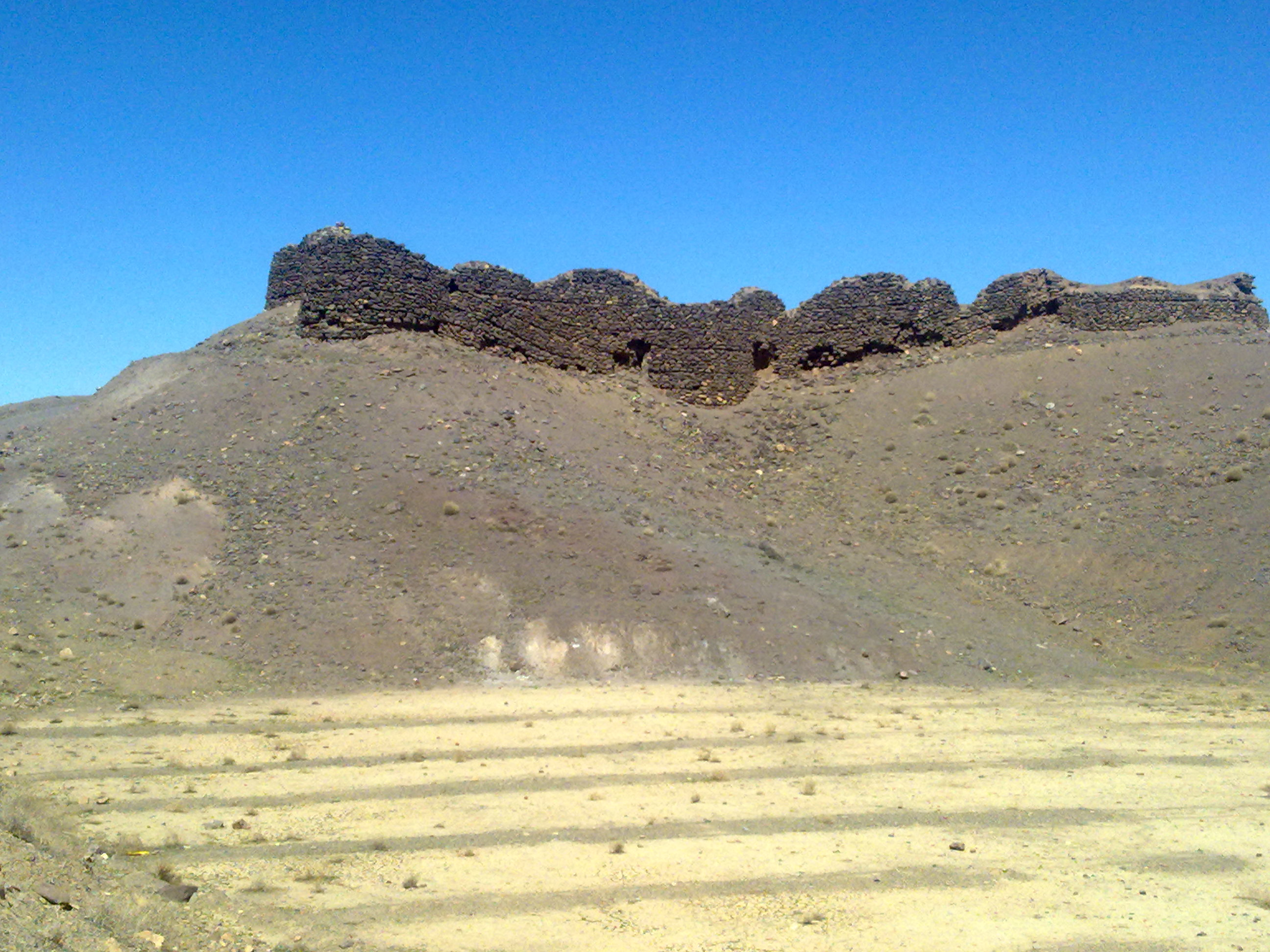
- Shelter of the last emperor of Sasanian Iran, Yazdegerd III

- Location within Iran
- Coordinates: 34°16′35″N 58°29′14″E
- Country: Iran
- Province: Razavi Khorasan
- County: Gonabad
- District: Kakhk
- Rural District: Zibad
- Established: 200BC

Population (2016)
  - Total: 1,058
- Time zone: UTC+3:30 (IRST)
- Area code: 0511

Zibad (Persian: زيبَد) (Note: Also romanized as Zībad) is a village in, and the capital of, Zibad Rural District in Kakhk District of Gonabad County, Razavi Khorasan province, Iran.

== Demographics ==
=== Population ===
At the time of the 2006 National Census, the village's population was 868 in 288 households. The following census in 2011 counted 856 people in 309 households. The 2016 census measured the population of the village as 1,058 people in 397 households. It was the most populous village in its rural district.

Zibad (Eng. "beautiful") was a famous ancient area in Shahnameh. According to Shahnameh Ferdowsi (around 1000 AD), it was the place of a famous war called Davazdah Rokh ("Twelve Heroes") between Iran and Turan. Zibad also has an ancient qanat that may be more than 1,600 years old.

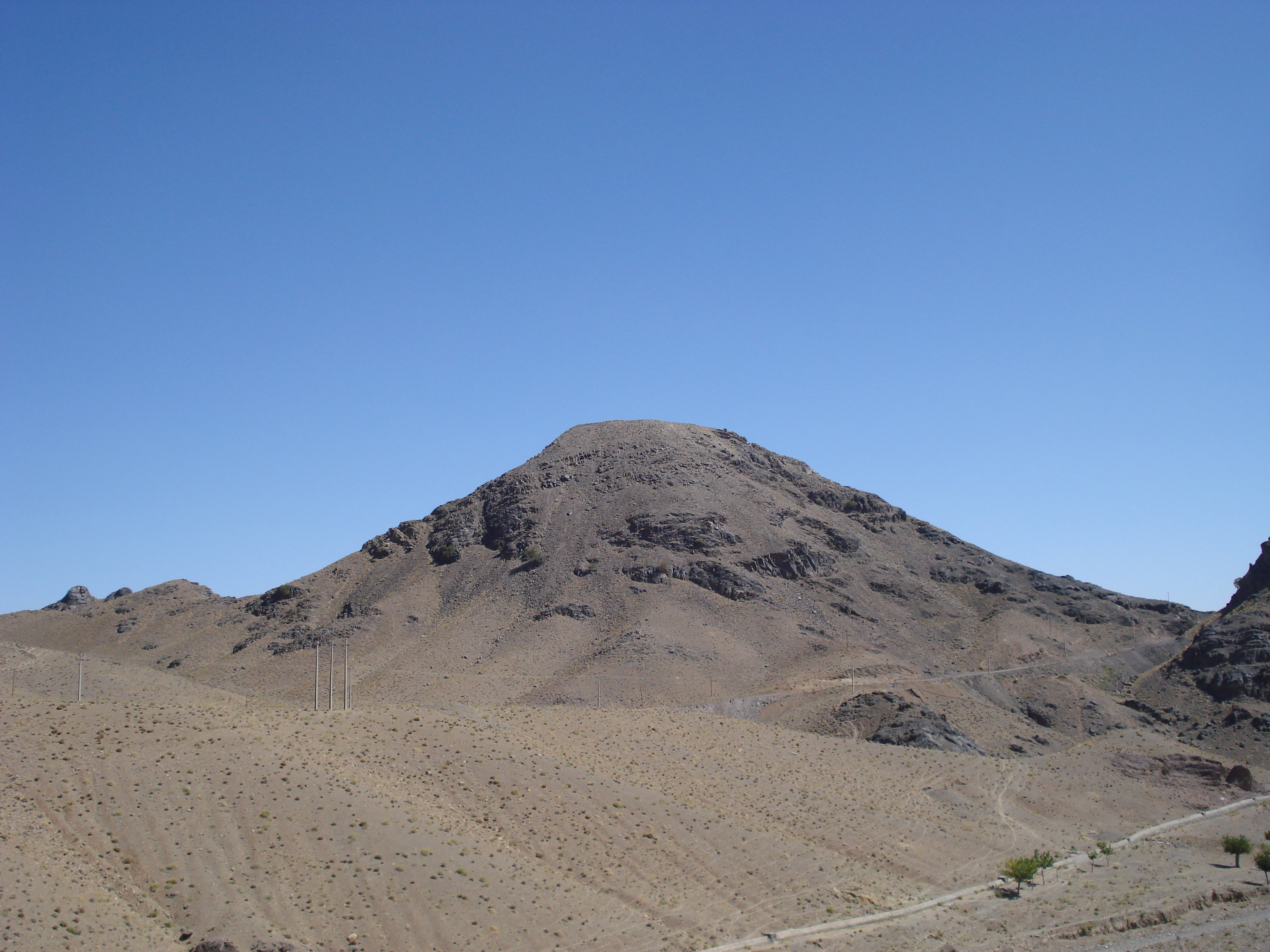
Qaleh-ye Zibad, a Sasanian castle

== Products and sites ==
- its saffron, watermelon, melon, rice and in the past also opium production.
- its ancient castle which was the shelter of the last emperor of sasanian iran, Yazdegerd III, the place of three ancient wars, and its Mithraism monument.
- its Qanat and dar e soufe, a famous mountain rock wall, similar to Taq-e Bostan
- its water clock which had been in continuous use from 400BCE until 1950.
- Its Watermill, producing flour and cracked wheat. The ancient water mill was at work until 1984 and destroyed for the construction of a dam.

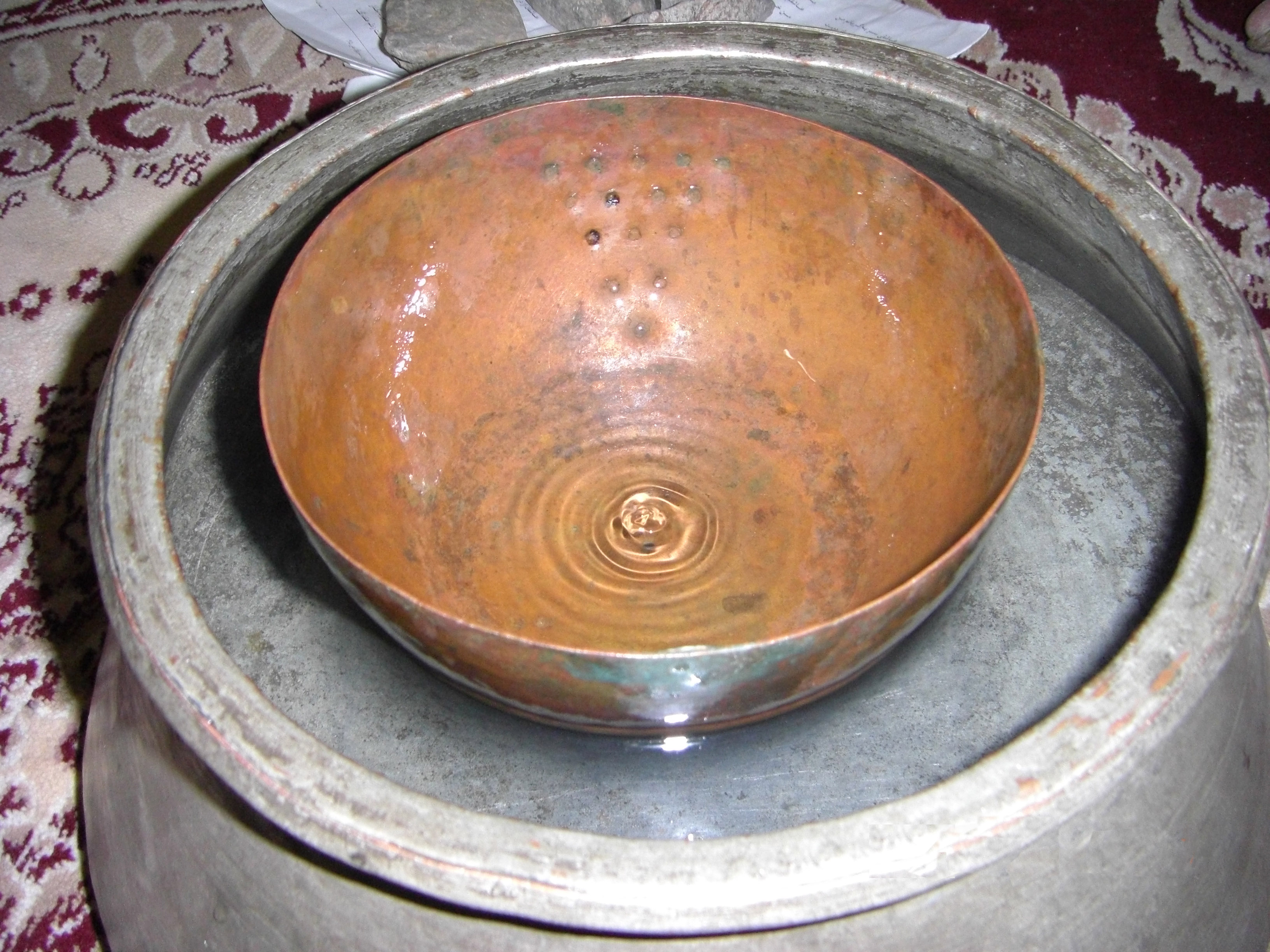
Ancient water clock used in a qanat of Gonabad 2,500 years ago

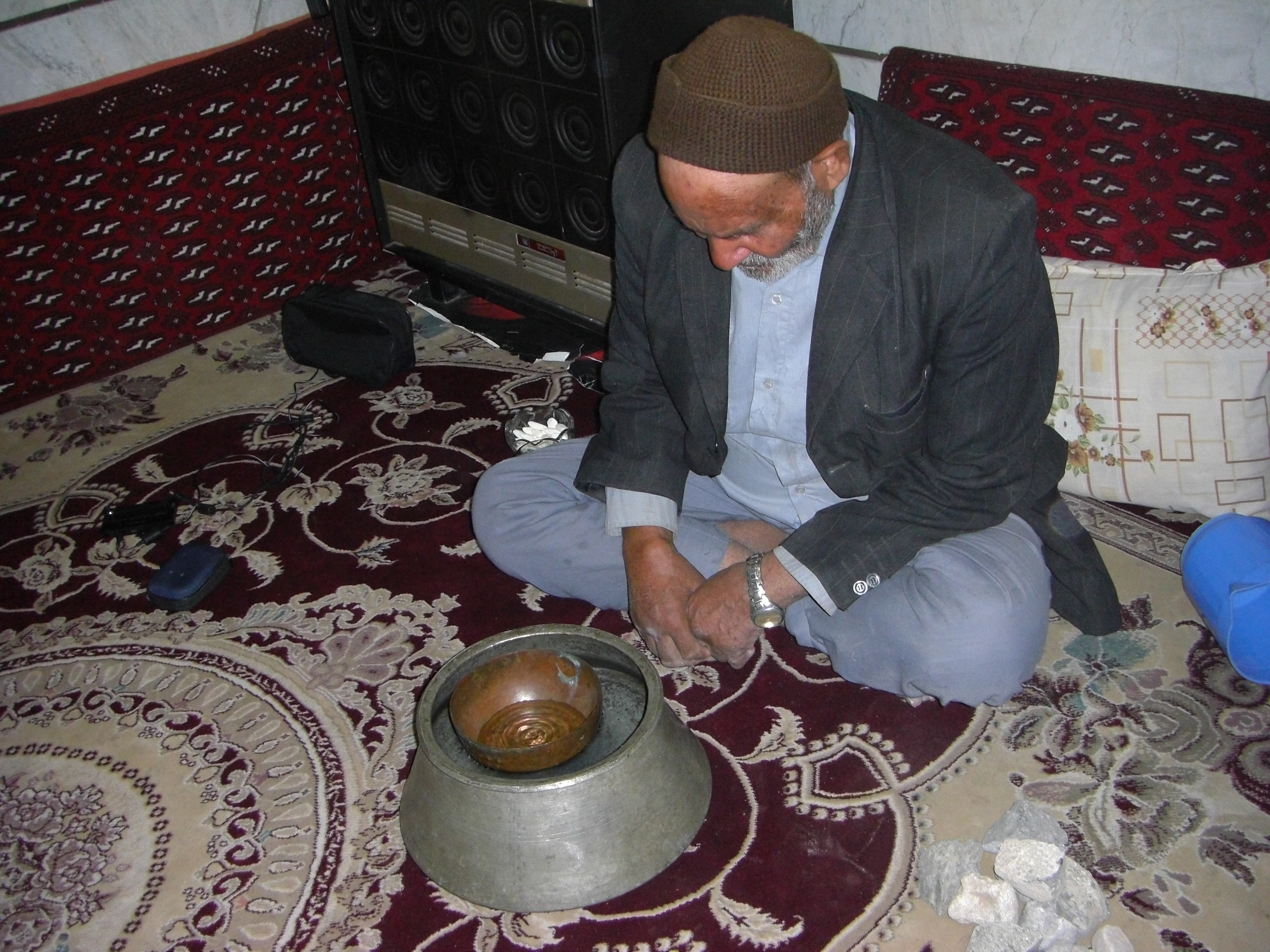
Reconstruction of the scene with a real manager of the water clock

According to Callisthenes, the Persians were using water clocks in 328BCE to ensure a just and exact distribution of water from qanats to their shareholders for agricultural irrigation. The use of water clocks in Iran, especially in Zibad, dates back to 500BCE. Later they were also used to determine the exact holy days of pre-Islamic religions, such as the Nowruz, Chelah, or Yaldā - the shortest, longest, and equal-length days and nights of the years. The water clocks used in Iran were one of the most practical ancient tools for timing the yearly calendar. .

== Kūh-Zibad ==
The mountain of Kūh-Zibad is located near Zibad, and is the second-highest mountain in Razavi Khorasan province. Kūh-Zibad is famous because of some great historical events. Its peak is called Tir Mahi. The terrain around Kuh-e Zibad is mainly hilly. The highest point in the vicinity is 2,775 meters (9,104 ft) above sea level, 17.7 km (11.0 mi) southeast of Qole-e Tir Mahi. Around Kuh-e Zibad is very sparsely populated, with 5 inhabitants per square kilometre. Nearest society Zibad, 8.5 km (5.3 mi) north of Kuh-e Zibad. The neighbourhood around Kuh-e Zibad is barren with little vegetation. In the neighbourhood around are unusually many named mountains and valleys. A cold steppe climate prevailing in the region. The average annual temperature in the area is 17 °C. The warmest month is July when the average temperature is 30 °C, and the coldest is January, with 1 °C. Average annual rainfall is 211 mm (8 in). The rainiest month is February, with an average of 58 mm (2 in) of precipitation, and the driest is July, with 1 mm of precipitation. This mountain had been referred in some historical book such as shahnameh in Davazdah Rokhwar as the Zibad mountain and its eastern part is called black mountain or kouh Gonabad. the long-range mountain called Qohestan and It extends from Bajestan to Birjand near the border with Afghanistan this rang mountain separate south Khorasan from Razavi Khorasan, part of this rang mountain near Kakhk is called black mountain or Kouh e Gonabad

== Zibad Castle ==
Zibad Castle is one of the four historical monuments of Zibad. It is located in Gonabad and is believed to be the last shelter of the last Sasanian emperor Yazdegerd III. It was registered in 2001 as an Iranian national heritage property, as it is related to the history of pre-Islamic Iran. There is the royal castle nationally registered in 2002 under the name of Shahab Castle. Sources conflict as to the exact manner of the emperor's final moments. One suggests that after his defeat, he sought refuge at a mill near Marv, the latter who killed Yazdegerd in order to obtain his jewelry. The Cambridge History of Iran states that the miller was sent by Mahoe Suri. According to the history of Belazari, Yazdegerd III was defeated in a war in the city of Gonabad.

According to the excavations of Zibad-Gonabad Fortress and according to oral narrations and the report of Blazeri and Habib Abdolhai, Dr Ajam and Abas Zmani (historical study magazine 1974), it seems that the narration related to the murder of Yazdgerd in Merw Mill is more mythical than fact. What is closer to the truth is the narration of Al-Baladhuri in Kitab Futuh al-Buldan, that he was killed in Gonabad.

The main text of Blazeri's book The Fate of Yazdgerd III:

Then he went to Khorasan, then he went to Janabad (Gonabad) he was welcomed and ruler of Merv send Nizak Trkhan to welcome him in Gonabad. but after weeks he asked the emperor to marry his daughter and the emperor refused and this caused a war and at the end Nizak defeats the king's army and destroys and captures remnants of the imperial forces. The battle occurred in Zibad Gonabad. Mahoe Suri was probably from the House of Suren, one of the seven Parthian clans of the Sasanian state. During the Islamic invasion of Iran, Yazdegerd III went to refuge in Marv; on his way to Merv he stayed in Gonabad Mahoe. The envoy warmly received them. Mahoe Suri used opportunity to secretly plot with the Hephthalite ruler Nizak against Yazdegerd.

Regardless, the death of Yazdegerd marked the end of the Sasanian Empire, and made it less difficult for the Arabs to conquer the rest of Iran. All of Khorasan was soon conquered by the Arabs, who would use it as a base to attack Transoxiana. The death of Yazdegerd thus marked the end of the last pre-Islamic Iranian empire after more than 400 years of rule. An empire–which had a generation earlier briefly conquered Egypt and Asia Minor, even reaching as a far as Constantinople, fell to a force of lightly equipped Arabs that were used to skirmishes and desert warfare. The heavy Sasanian cavalry was too sluggish and systematized to contain them; employed light-armed Arab or East Iranian mercenaries from Khorasan and Transoxiana would have been much more successful.

== Sights and attractions ==
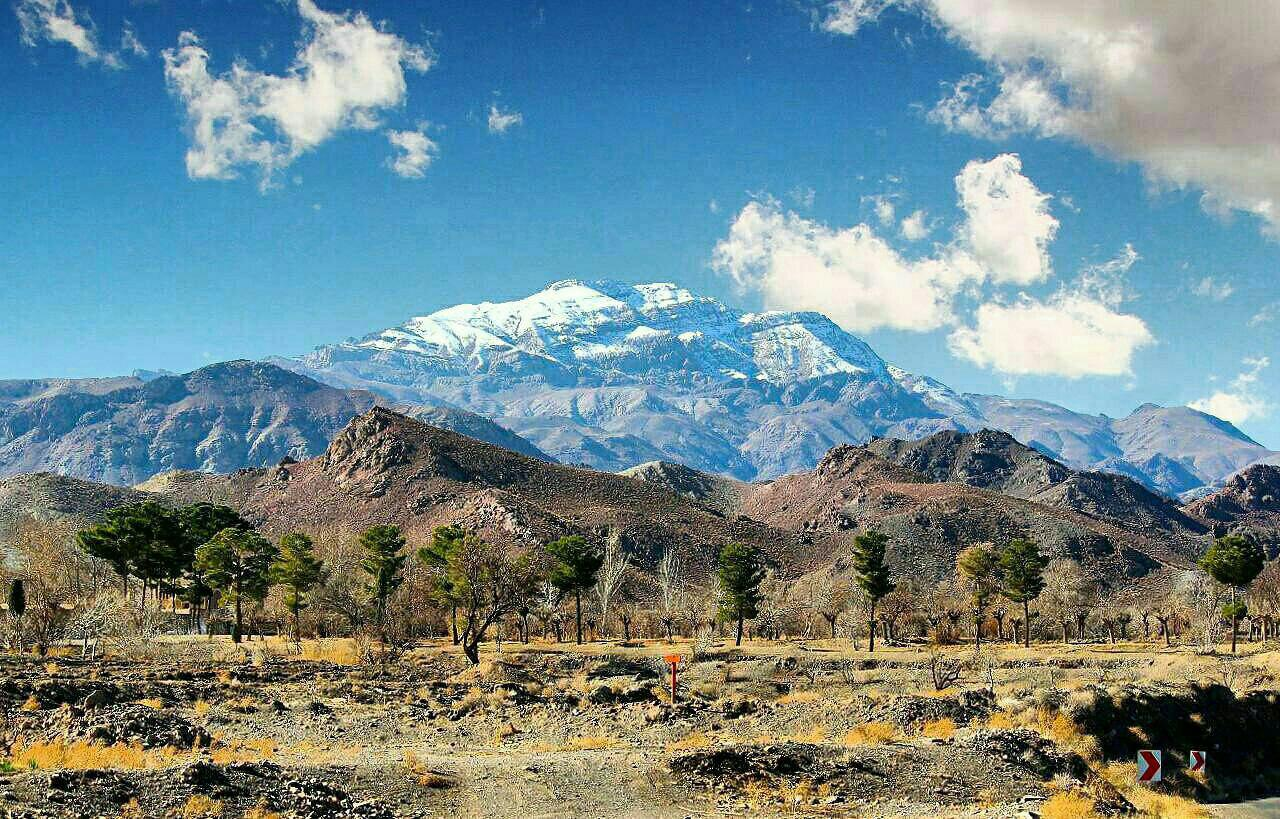
zibad Mountain

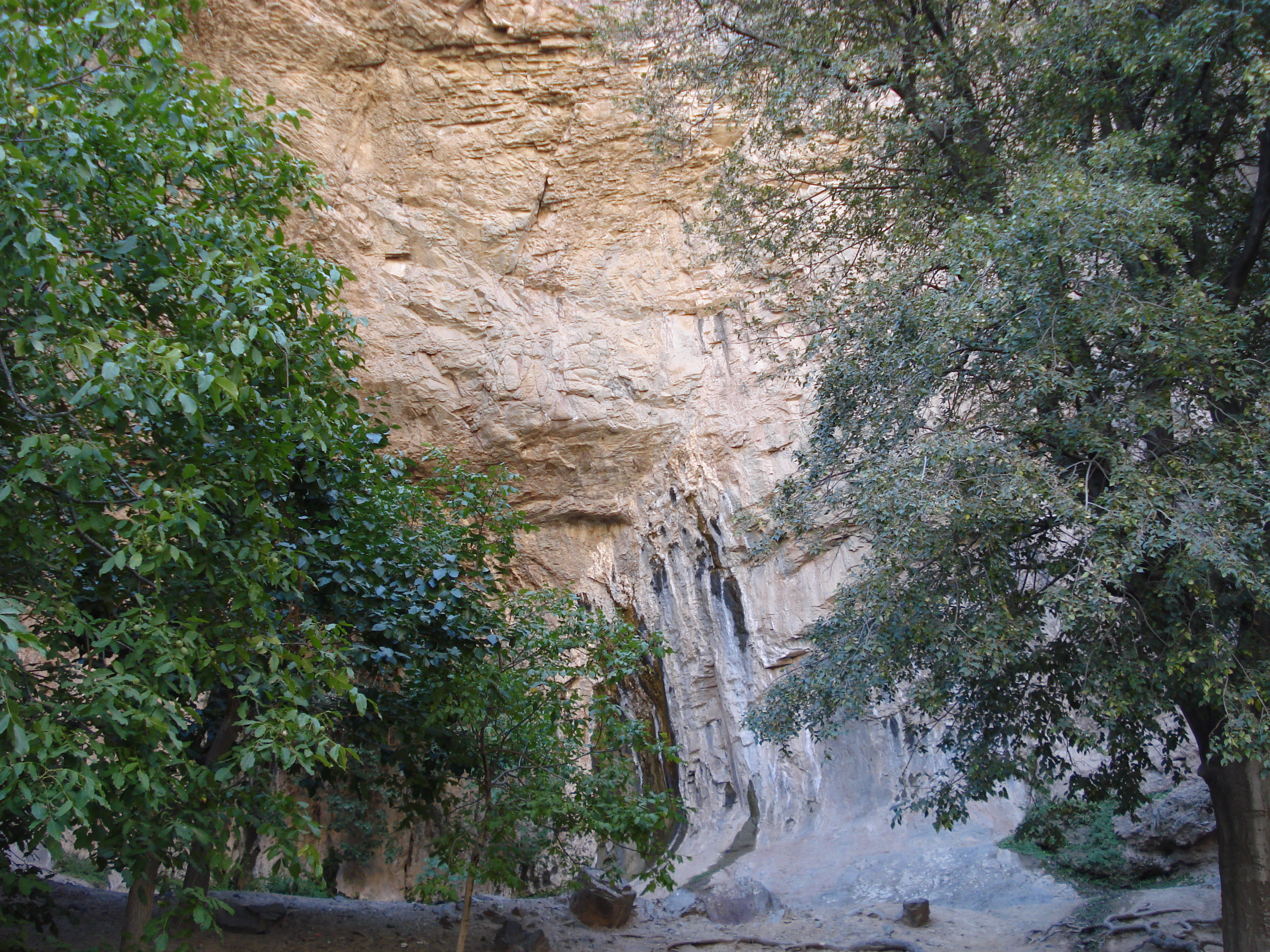
Soufe Zibad

Zibad is an ancient place with many historical places. The Davazdah Rokh war had occurred in Zibad.

== Sufeh Pir ==
Sufeh Pir is another famous place in Zibad, a holy cave believed to be the tomb of Piran Viseh in the Kūh-Zibad mountain. He is a Turanian figure in Shahnameh, the national epic of Greater Iran. Beside Shahnameh, Piran is also mentioned in other sources such as Tabari and Tha'ālibī. He is the king of Khotan and the spahbed of Afrasiab, the king of Turan.

According to the book of Dr. Abas Zamani Piran Viseh was buried in the cave of Sofe Zibad now called DarSufa Pir.

== Sarv-e Zibad ==
The Cypress of Zibad (Persian: سرو زیبد Sarv-e Zibad), is a Cupressus sempervirens tree in Zibad, Sarv-e Zibad is 10 km (6.2 mi) from Qanats of Ghasabeh a UNESCO's World Heritage Sites since 2016. Sarv-e Zibad is protected by the Cultural Heritage Organization of Iran as a national natural monument and is a major tourist attraction with a height of 20 metres and with a perimeter of 6.5 meters (21 ft) at its trunk and 16 meters (52 ft) higher up around its branches. It is estimated to be over two millennia old and is likely the second-oldest living lifeform in Iran. The exact age of the tree has been difficult to determine, but it is estimated to be between around 2000 years old. Despite the desert and dry place with little rain natural conditions of its location have been credited as the main reason for the tree's longevity.. (Persian: سرو زیبد) Sarv Zibad is 1 km (0.62 mi) from Davazdah Rokh battle field near to the Kūh-Zibad and Zibad Castle it was center of ancient Zibad and now located north of the central roundabout of Zibad.

== Culture ==
Holding the Yalda Night and festival of Davazdah Rokh is 2 most famous festival of Zibad. Iranian festivals such as Yaldā Night and Nowruz are celebrated in Zibad.

== Gallery ==
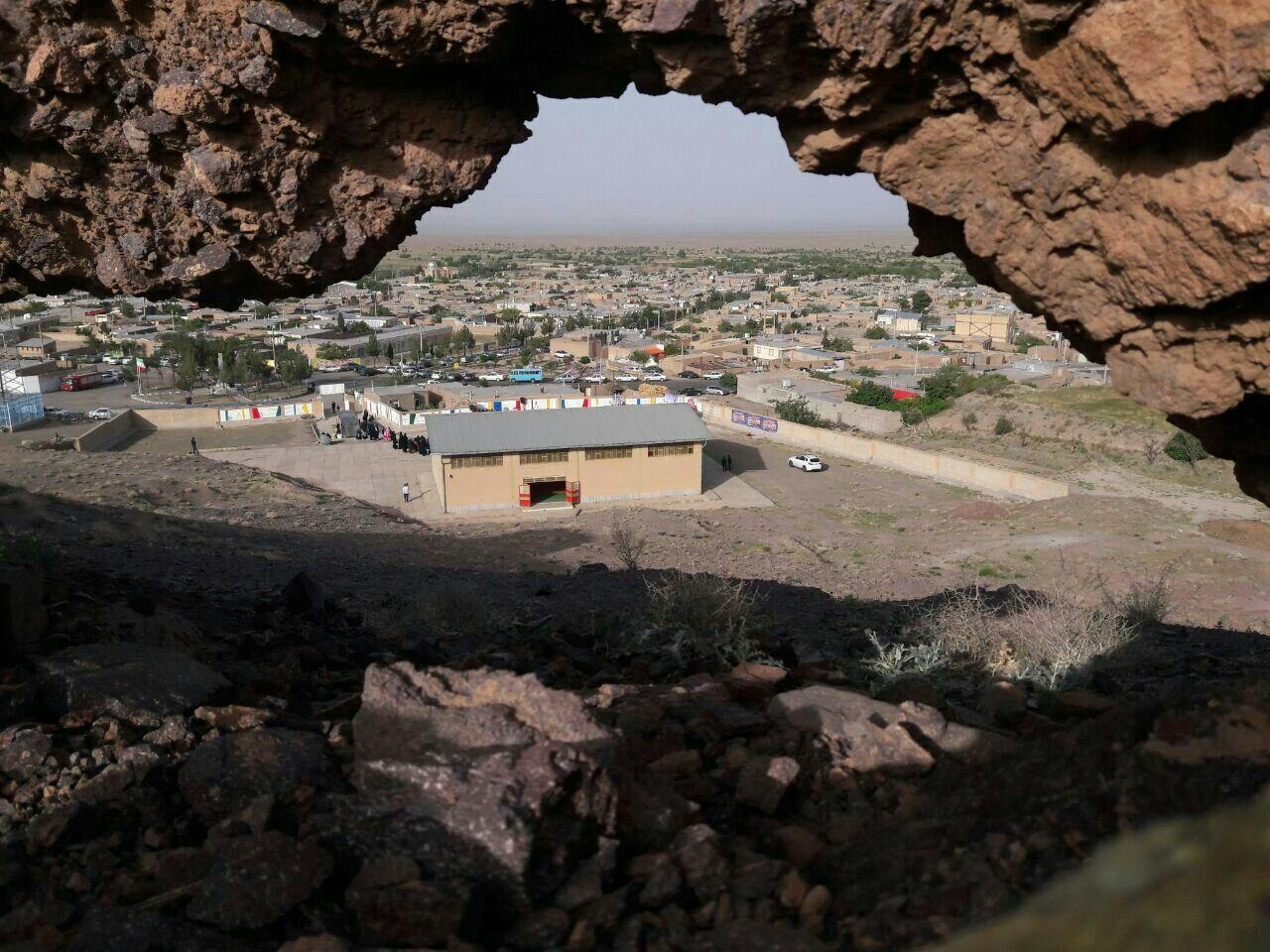
Zibad Castle

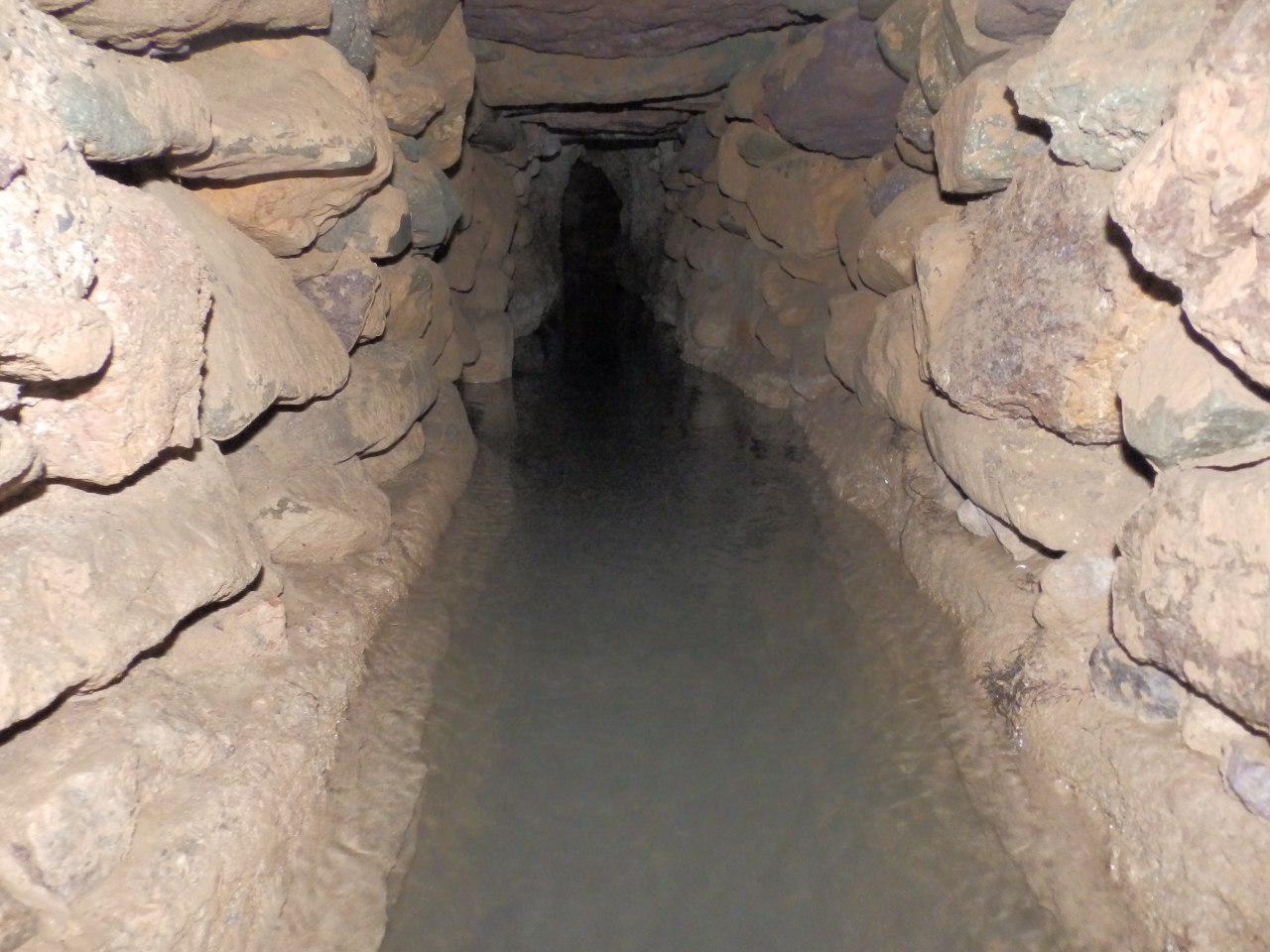
Ancient qanat in Zibad

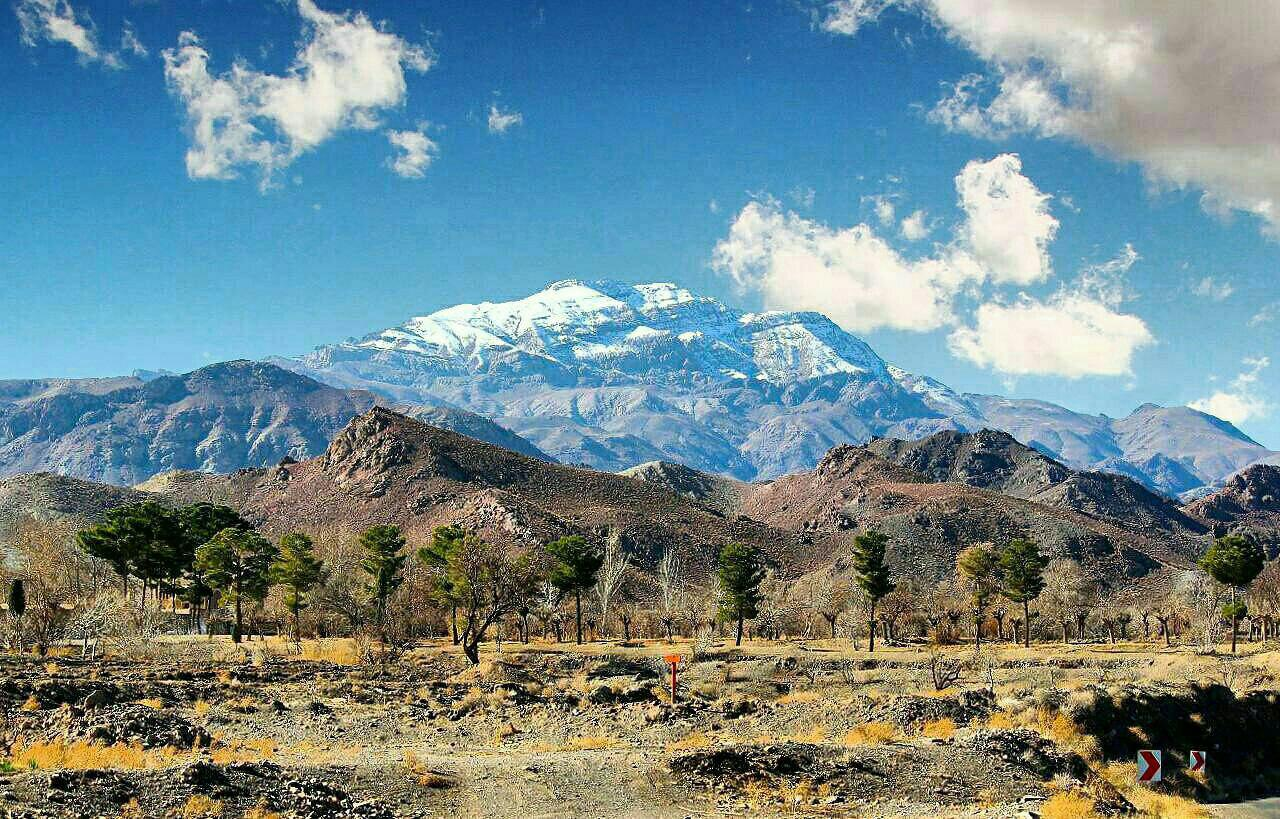
Kuh-e Tir-e Mahi mountain

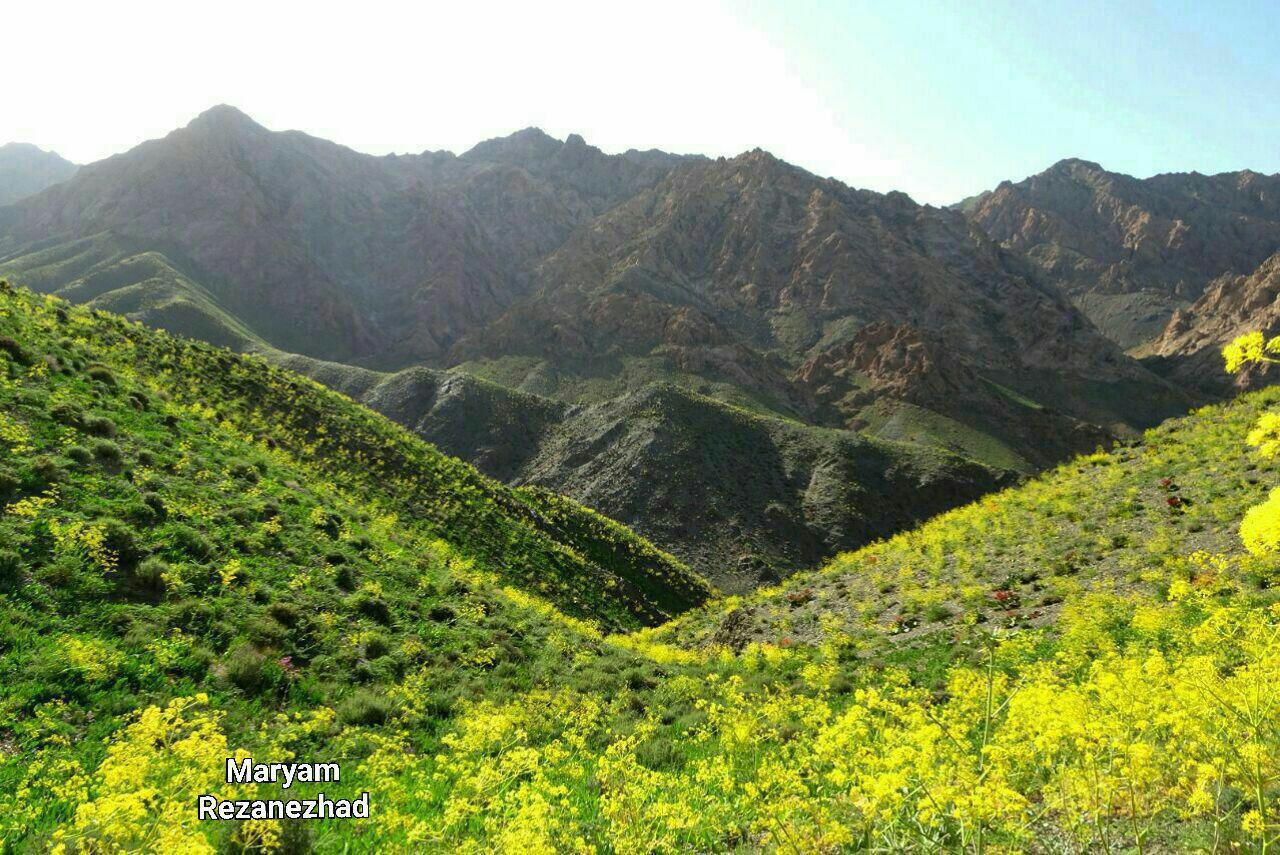
Landscape near Zibad

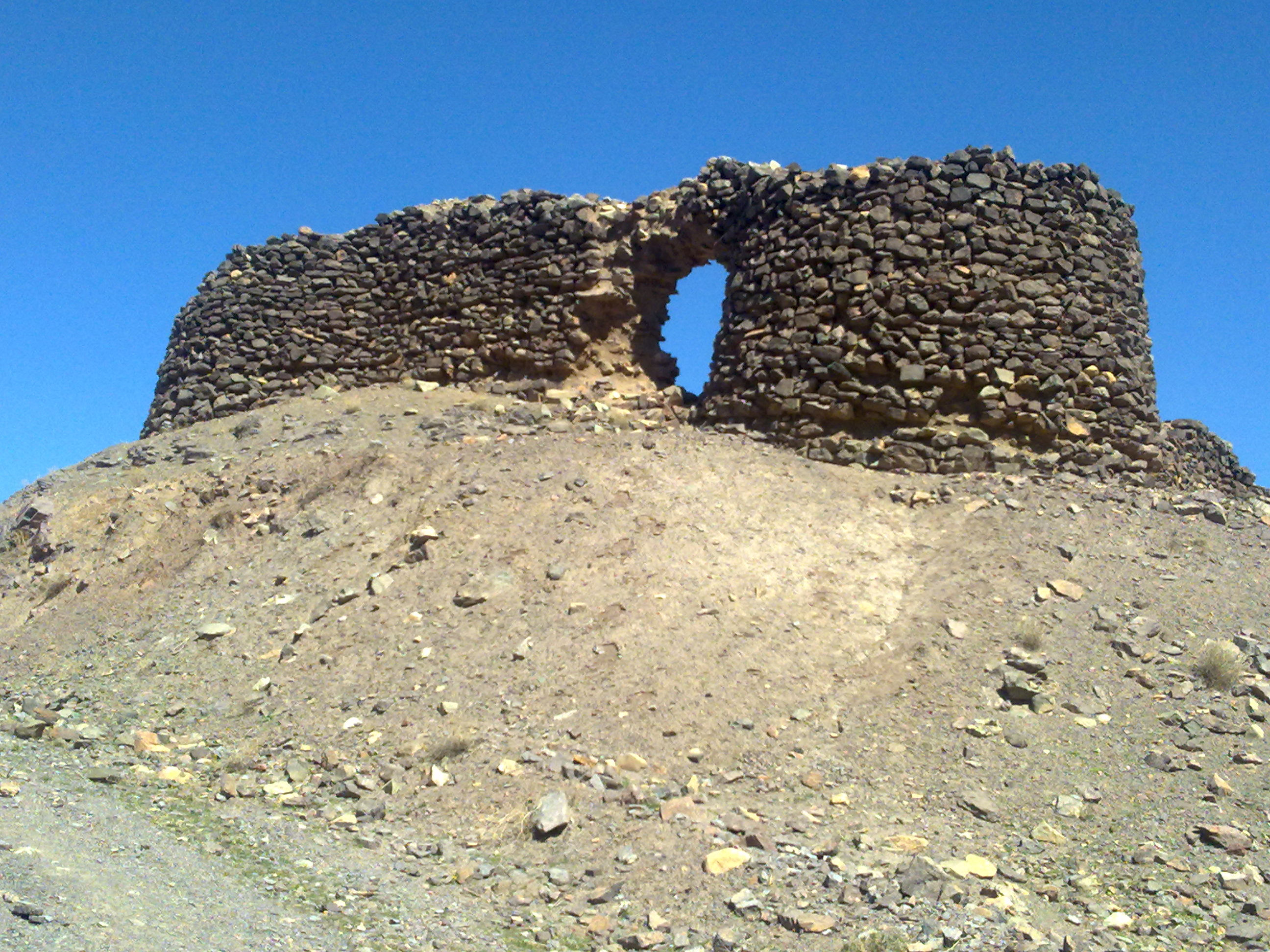
Castle

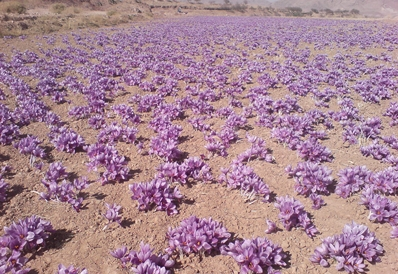
Field of saffron

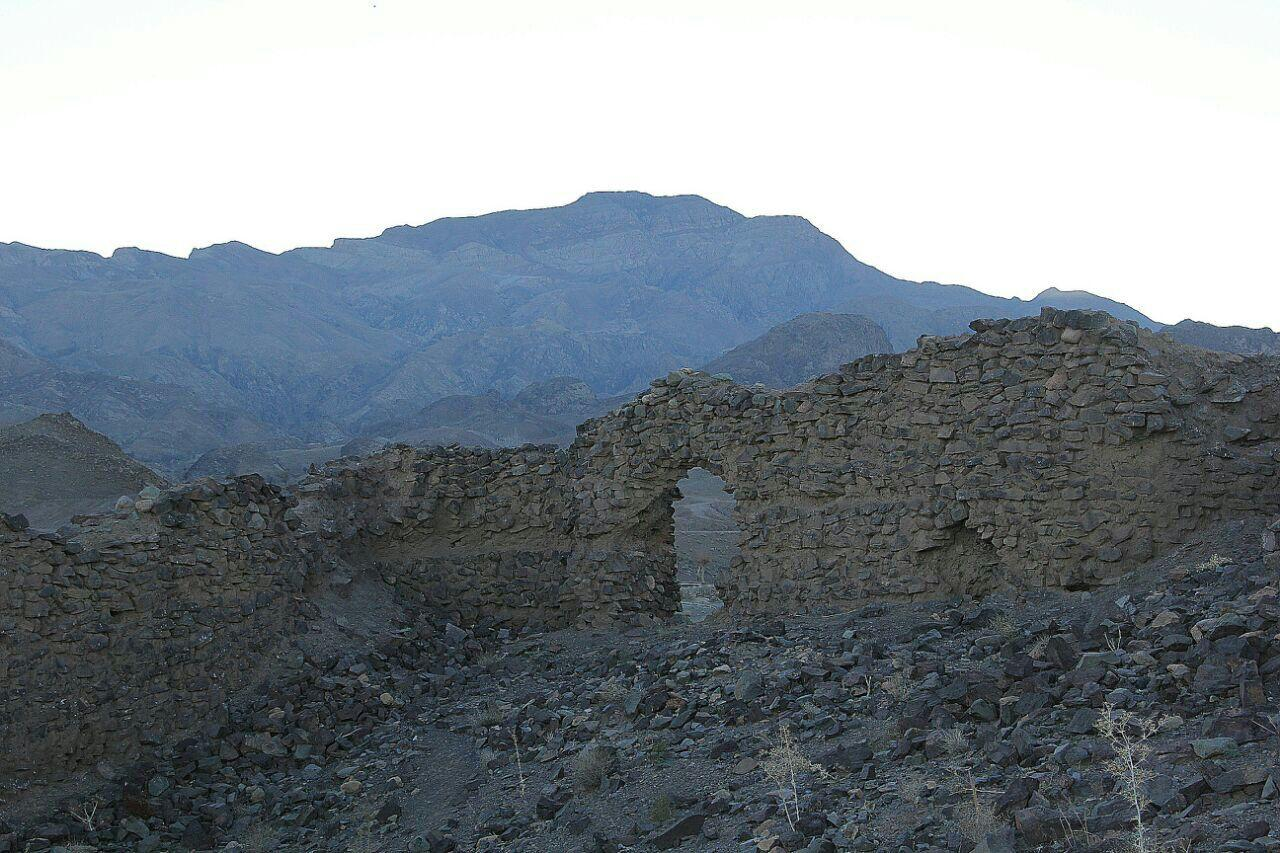
Zibad Castle

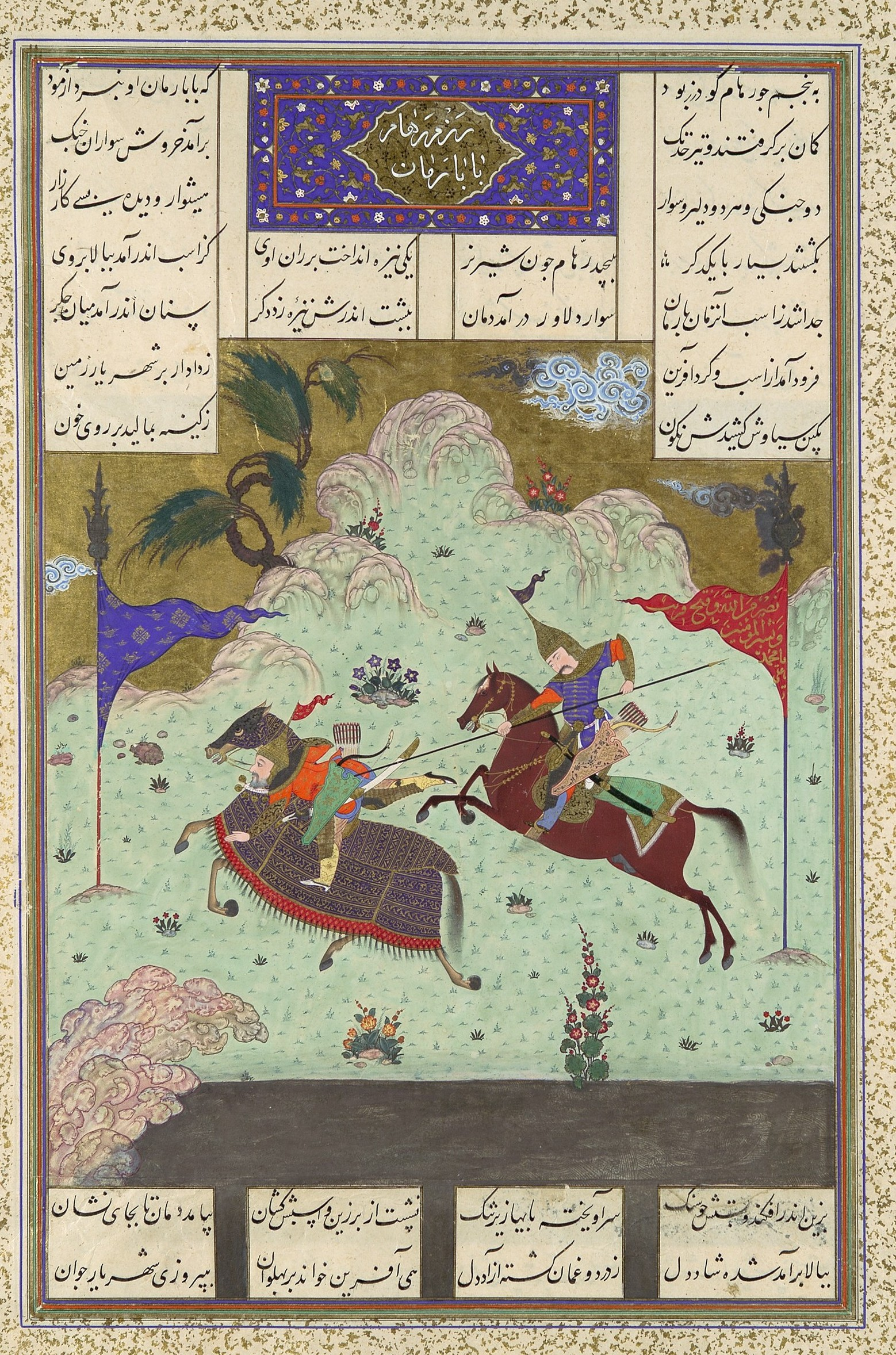
Davazdah Rokh war painting

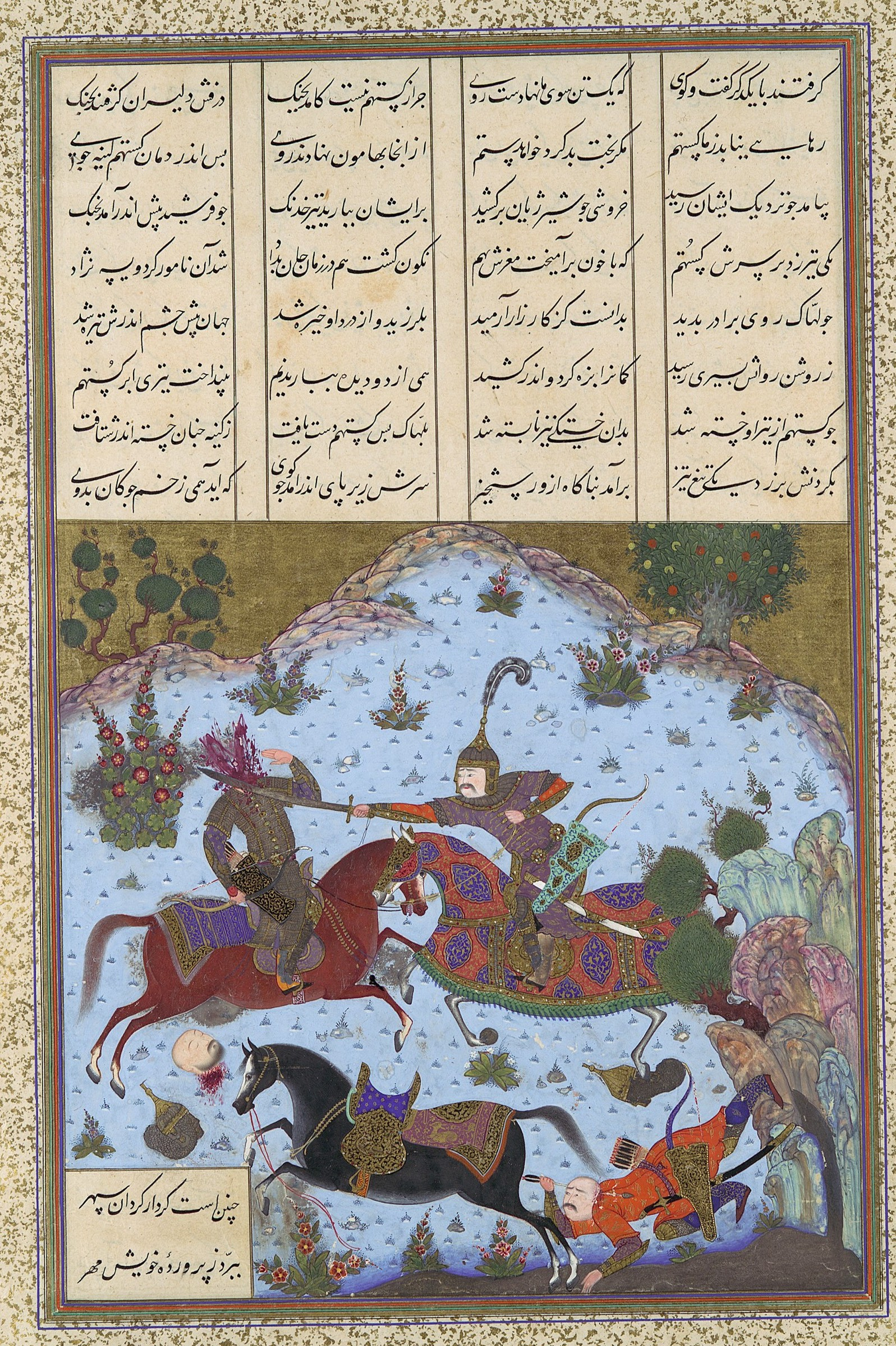
Davazdah Rokh war painting

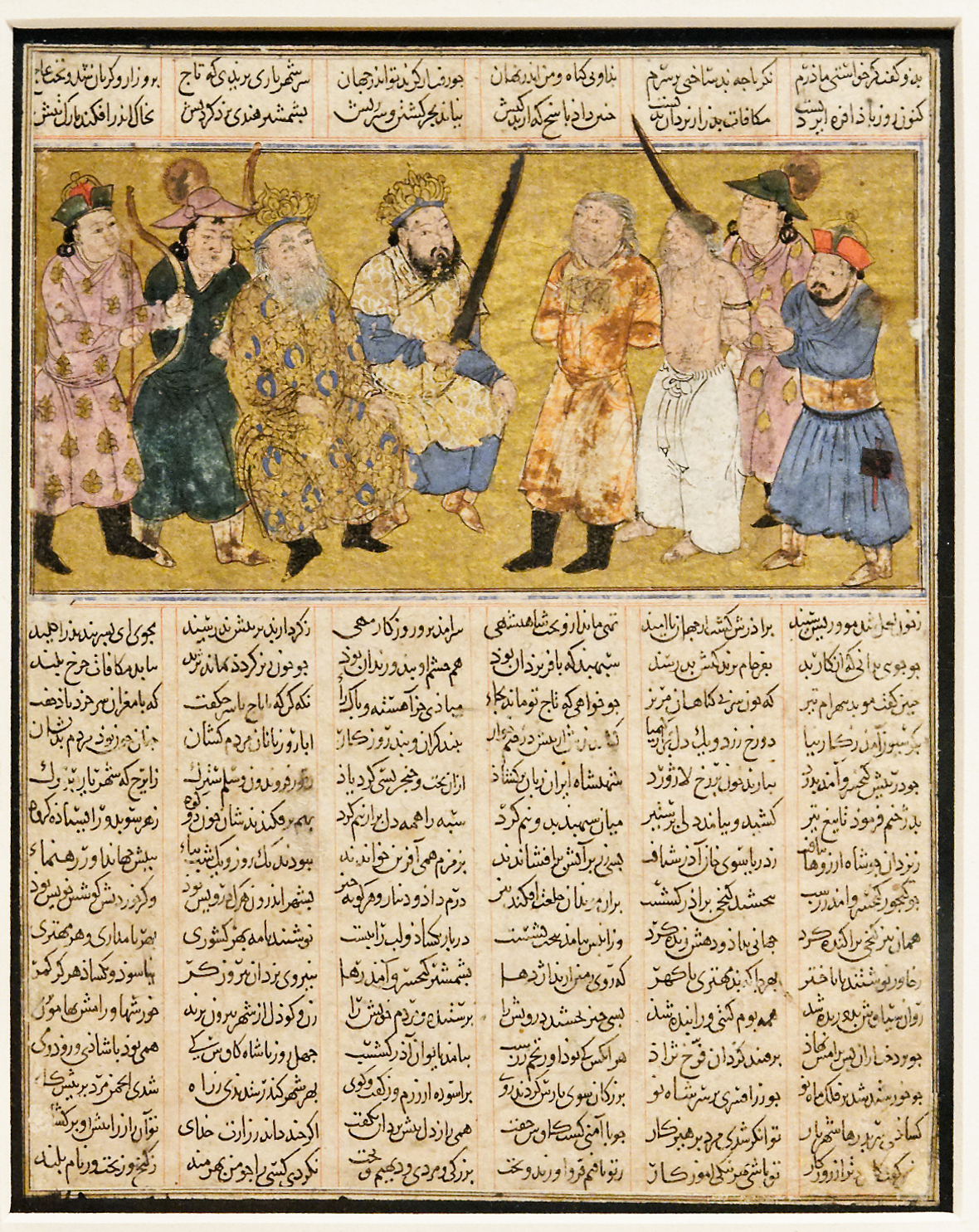
Davazdah Rokh war painting

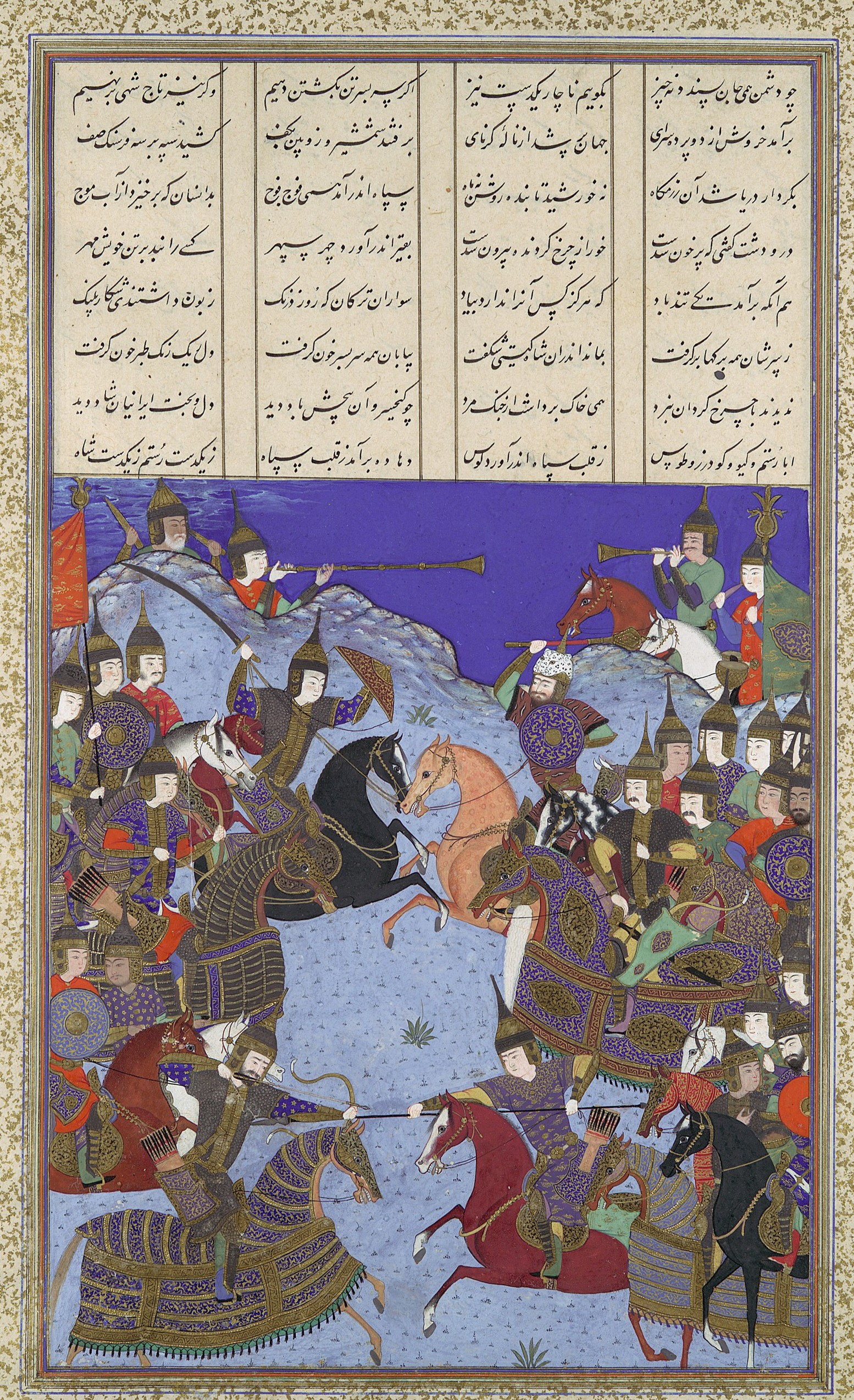
Davazdah Rokh war painting

== See also ==
- Cypress of Kashmar
- Davazdah Rokh
- Gonabad
- Kay Khosrow
- Kūh-Zibad
- List of oldest trees
- Qanat
- Sarv-e Abarkuh
- Zibad Castle
- Media related to Zibad at Wikimedia Commons

== Bibliography ==
- Kia, Mehrdad (2016). The Persian Empire: A Historical Encyclopedia [2 volumes]: A Historical Encyclopedia. ABC-CLIO. ISBN 978-1610693912.
- Pourshariati, Parvaneh (2008). Decline and Fall of the Sasanian Empire: The Sasanian-Parthian Confederacy and the Arab Conquest of Iran. London and New York: I.B. Tauris. ISBN 978-1-84511-645-3.
- Shahbazi, A. Shapur (1986). "Army i. Pre-Islamic Iran". Encyclopaedia Iranica, Vol. II, Fasc. 5. London et al. pp. 489–499.
- Zarrinkub, Abd al-Husain (1975). "The Arab conquest of Iran and its aftermath". The Cambridge History of Iran, Volume 4: From the Arab Invasion to the Saljuqs. Cambridge: Cambridge University Press. pp. 1–57. ISBN 978-0-521-20093-6.
- Parssea magazine
- IRNA news agency
- Baran Kavir magazine No 62 Sarve Zibad Dr.M.Ajam
- Sarve in iran
