= Zibad Castle =

Ruined castle in Iran, Iranian national heritage site

- Gonabad
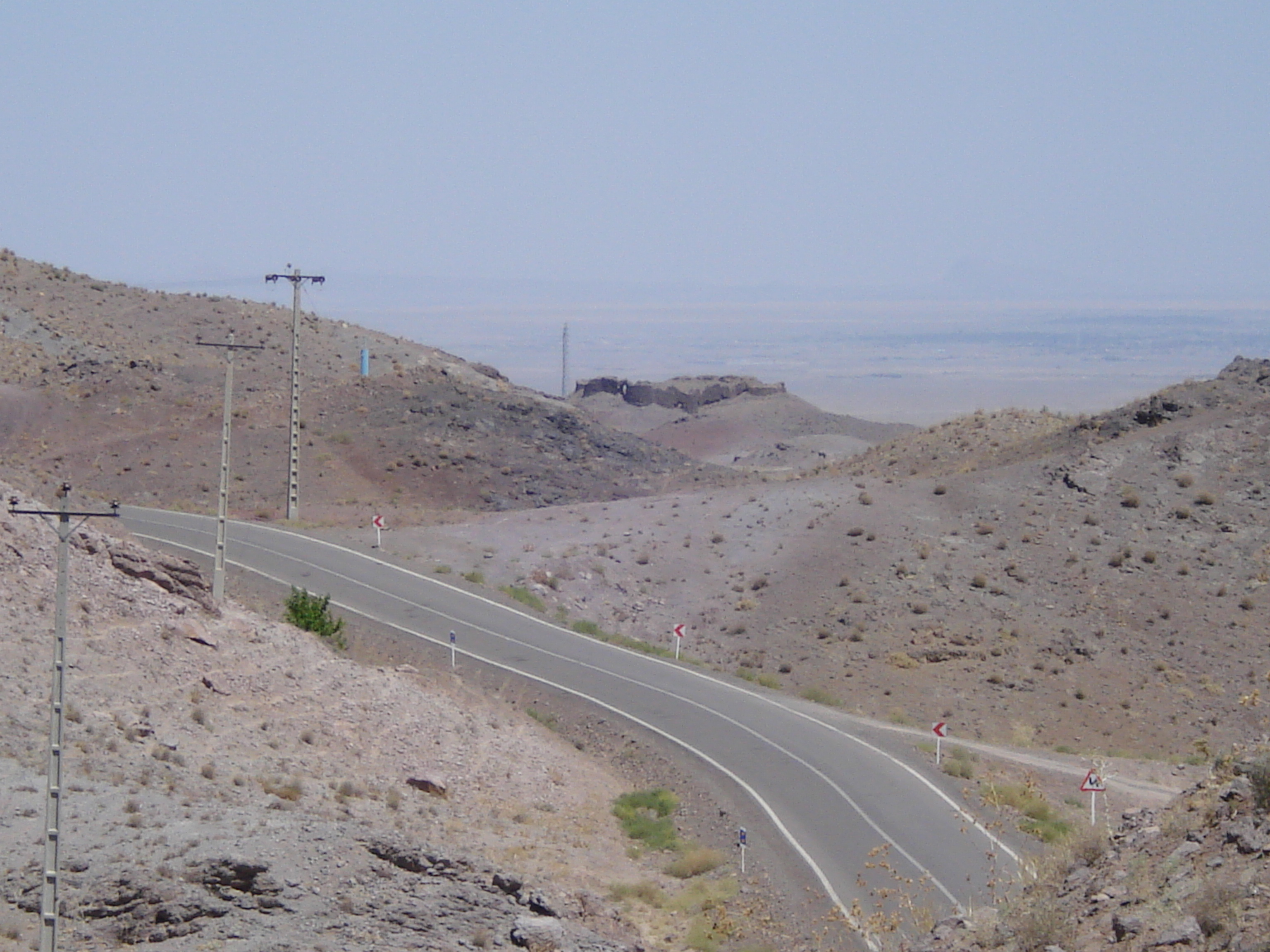

Site information
- Owner: National heritage Iran
- Condition: Ruins

Location
- Location within Iran
- Coordinates: 34°16′35″N 58°29′15″E
- Grid reference: grid reference TQ785256

Site history
- Built by: Sasanian Empire
- Materials: Sandscript stone
- Demolished: Post in War
- Battles/wars: Davazdah Rokh and Nizak tarkhan

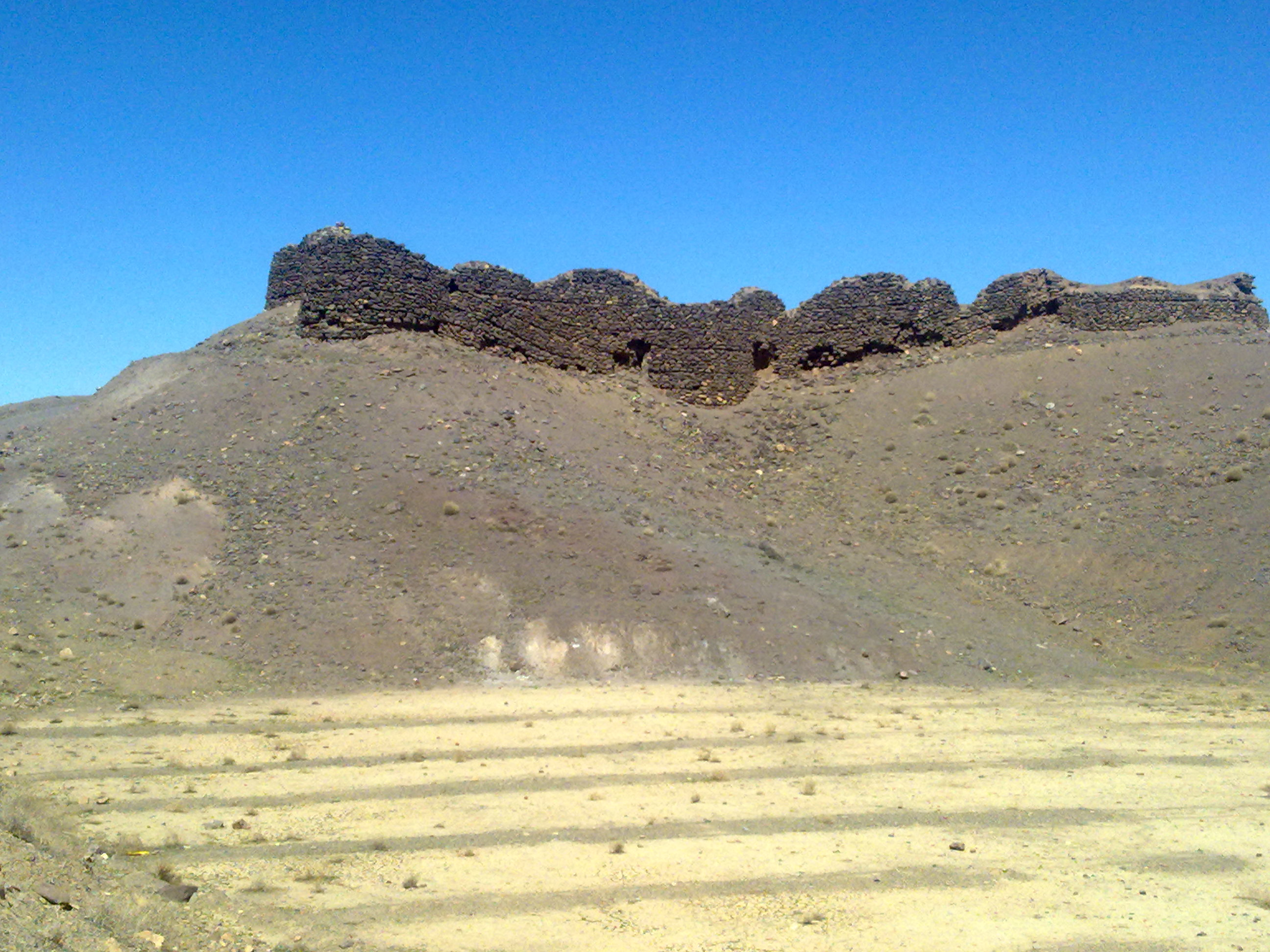
Ruins of Zibad Castle

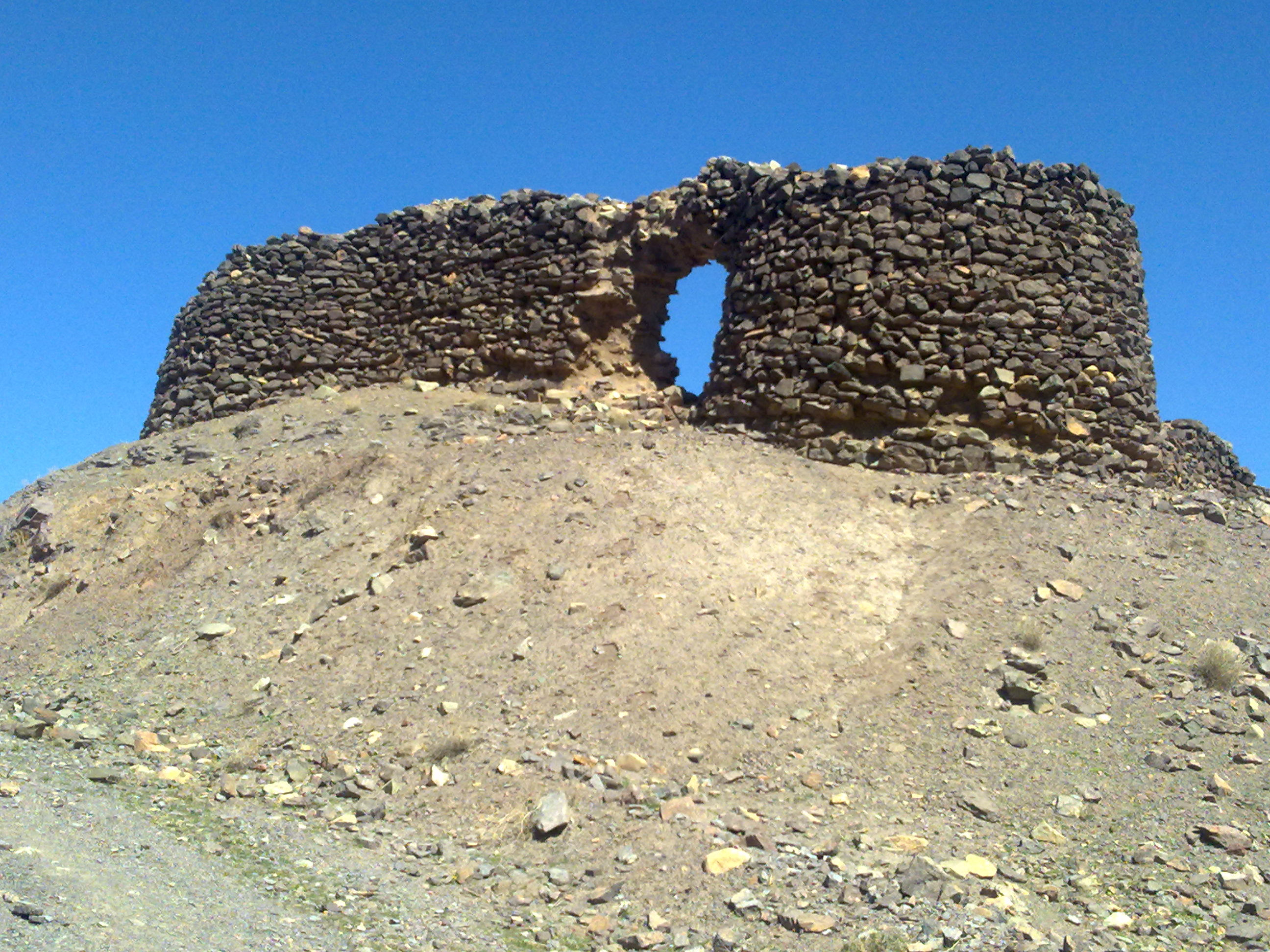
Ruins of Zibad Castle

Zibad Castle (Persian: قلعه زیبد) is one of the four historical monuments of Zibad, Iran, located in the Kakhk district of Gonabad County, in the Razavi Khorasan Province. It is believed to be the last refuge of Yazdegerd III, whose death signaled the collapse of the Sasanian Empire and the conquest of pre-Islamic Iran. In 2001, the castle was registered as a national heritage property. Zibad Castle has also been nationally registered under the name of Shahab Castle since 2002.

== Last shelter of the last Sasanian emperor ==
In 651, Yazdegerd III was defeated by the Muslim Arabs in the city of Gonabad in the province of Merv. His heavy Sasanian cavalry was too sluggish and systematized to contain them; if he had employed lightly armed Arab or East Iranian mercenaries from Khorasan and Transoxiana he would have been much more successful. Shortly after this, Yazdegerd III was murdered, leaving several different and contradictory narratives about his death.

One source reports he sought refuge with a miller, who killed him to obtain his jewelry on the orders of Mahoe Suri.

The narration of Al-Baladhuri in Kitab Futuh al-Buldan suggests that Yazdgerd was killed in Gonabad. The main text of Blazeri's book The Fate of Yazdgerd III:

During the Islamic invasion of Iran, Yazdegerd III went to refuge in Merv; on his way to Merv he stayed in Gonabad. Mahoe's envoy warmly received him in Gonabad. Mahoe used the opportunity to secretly plot with the Hephthalite ruler Nizak against Yazdegerd.

The death of Yazdegerd marked the end of the Sasanian Empire, the last Persian imperial dynasty before the arrival of Islam (224–651). All of Khorasan was soon conquered by the Arabs, who would use it as a base to attack Transoxiana.

== Sufeh Pir ==
Sufeh Pir is a cave believed to be the tomb of Piran Viseh in Kūh-Zibad mountain. He was a Turanian figure in Shahnameh, the national epic of Greater Iran. Beside Shahnameh, Piran is also mentioned in other sources such as Tabari and Tha'ālibī. He was the king of Khotan and the spahbed of Afrasiab, the king of Turan.

According to the book of Dr Abas Zamani Piran Viseh was buried in the cave of Sofe Zibad now called DarSufa Pir.

== See also ==
- Zibad
- Davazdah Rokh
- Kūh-Zibad
- Bajestan
- Ferdous
- Birjand

== Sources ==
- Zarrinkub, Abd al-Husain (1975). "The Arab conquest of Iran and its aftermath". The Cambridge History of Iran, Volume 4: From the Arab Invasion to the Saljuqs. Cambridge: Cambridge University Press. pp. 1–57. ISBN 978-0-521-20093-6.
- Pourshariati, Parvaneh (2008). Decline and Fall of the Sasanian Empire: The Sasanian-Parthian Confederacy and the Arab Conquest of Iran. London and New York: I.B. Tauris. ISBN 978-1-84511-645-3.
- Kia, Mehrdad (2016). The Persian Empire: A Historical Encyclopedia [2 volumes]: A Historical Encyclopedia. ABC-CLIO. ISBN 978-1610693912.
- Shahbazi, A. Shapur (1986). "Army i. Pre-Islamic Iran". Encyclopaedia Iranica, Vol. II, Fasc. 5. London et al. pp. 489–499.
- Morony, M. (1986). "ʿARAB ii. Arab conquest of Iran". Encyclopaedia Iranica, Vol. II, Fasc. 2. pp. 203–210.
- Report of a Persian magazine
- Castle of Shah Nesheen Zibad
- Dr Ajam, Geography of the 12 Rokh War in Zibad Gonabad, Mashahd University Magazine Simorgh No9 year9. 953942 شابک ۹۵۳۹۴۲
- 3 historical Places in Zibad. Persian book
- Geography of Gonabad
- Pangereh Magazine 2012 Castle of Zeibad by Dr Ajam
- Photo of the castle
- Zibad history by Dr Ajam
- shahname/12rokh war
- Book by Dr Zamani and Ajam 1972 no 41 magazine
- Article in Persian language. Parssea magazine, 2011
- Geography and tribe and minority in Khorasan, Mohammad Ajam, research published 1992, University of Imam Sadegh, Tehran.

== Gallery ==
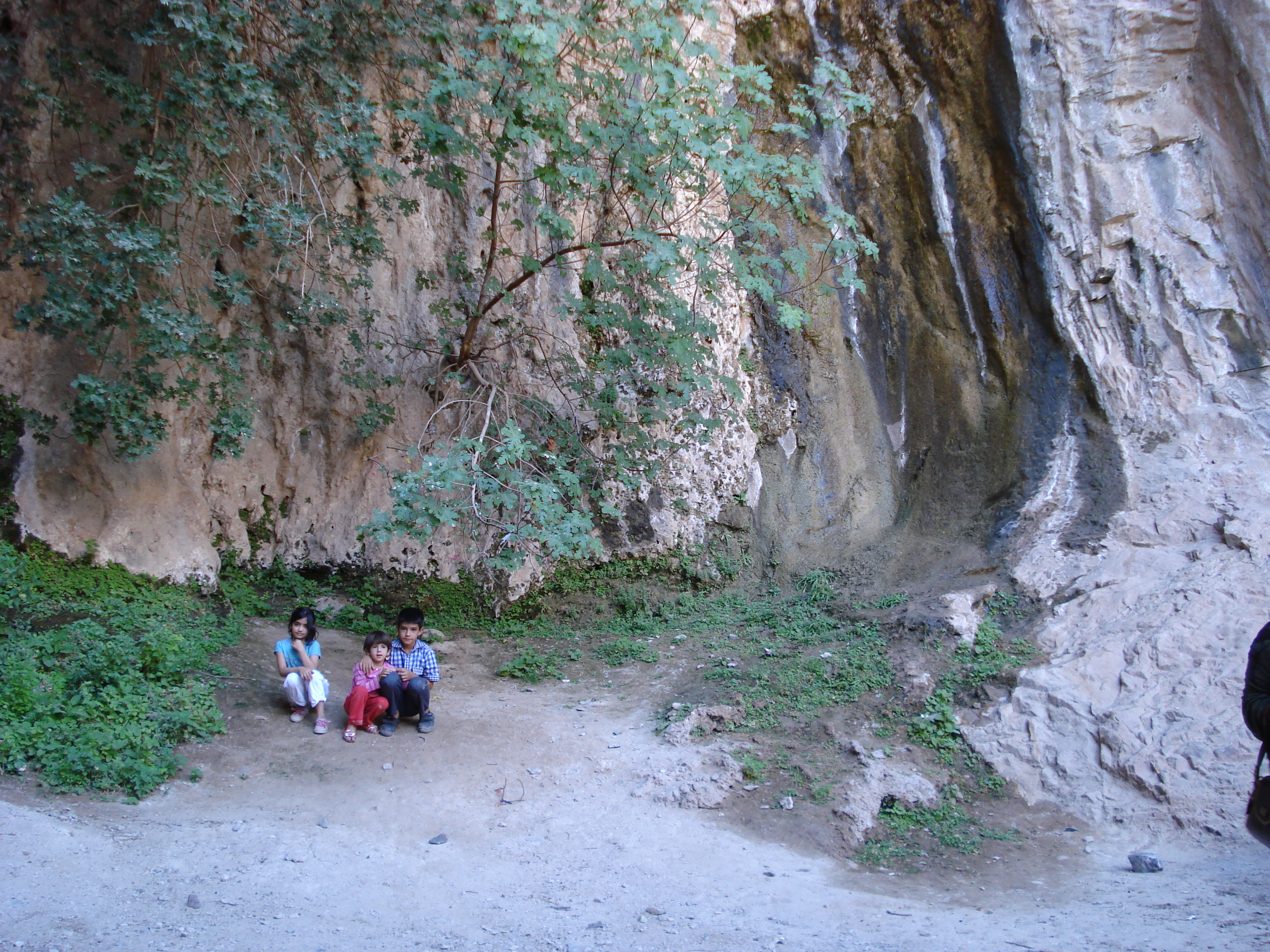
DarSoufeh.Zibad

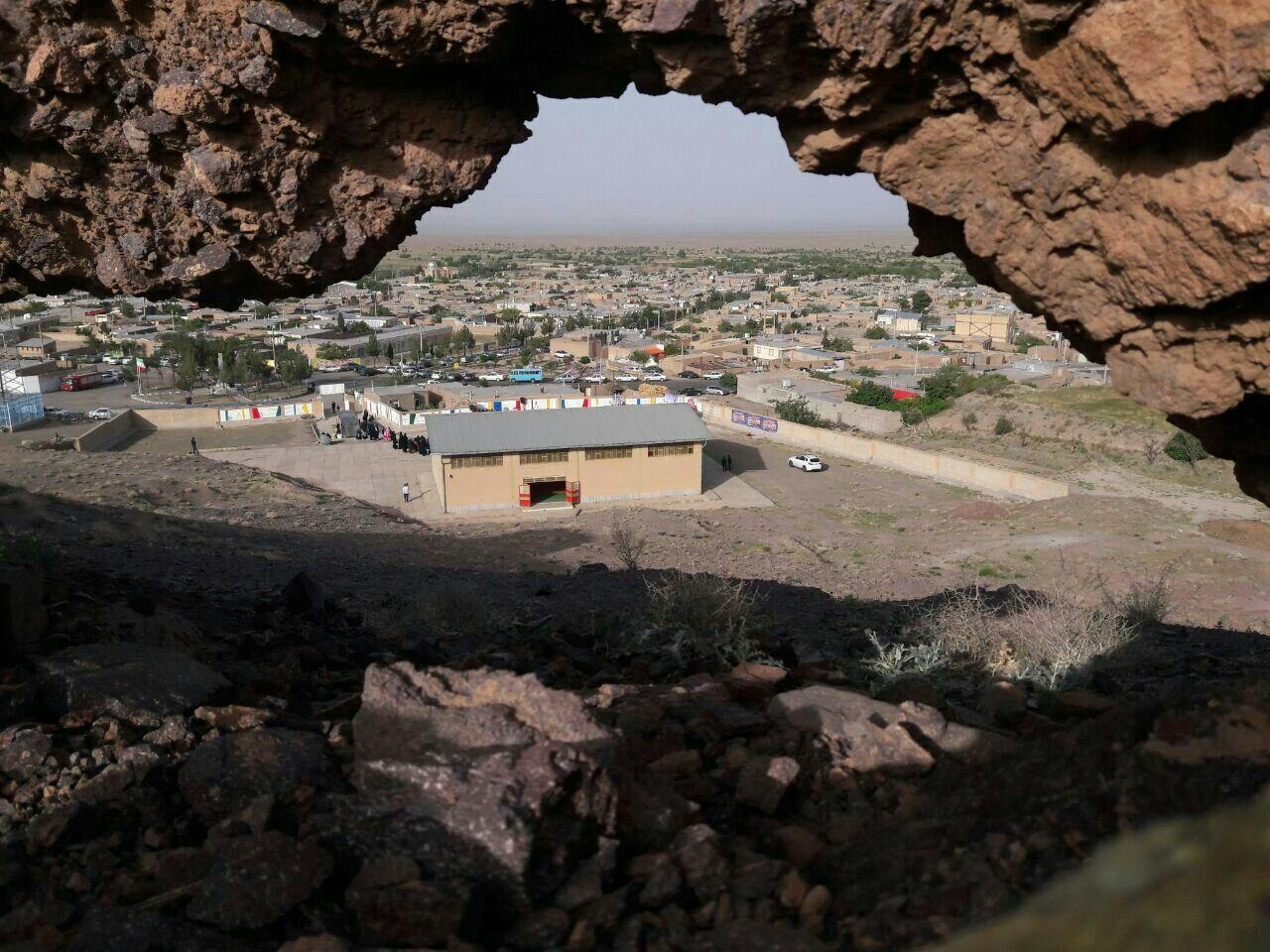
Zibad Castle زیبد

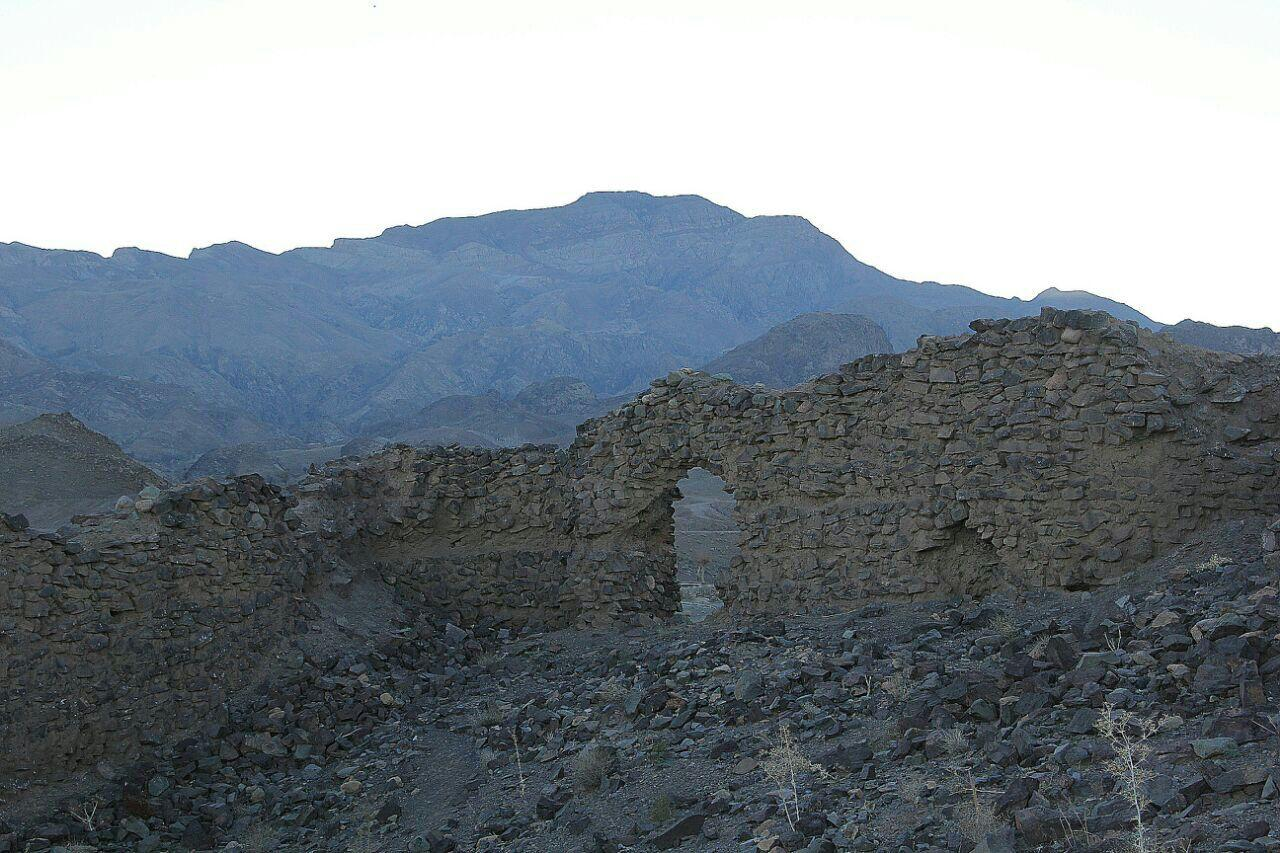
Zibad Castle قلعه زیبد

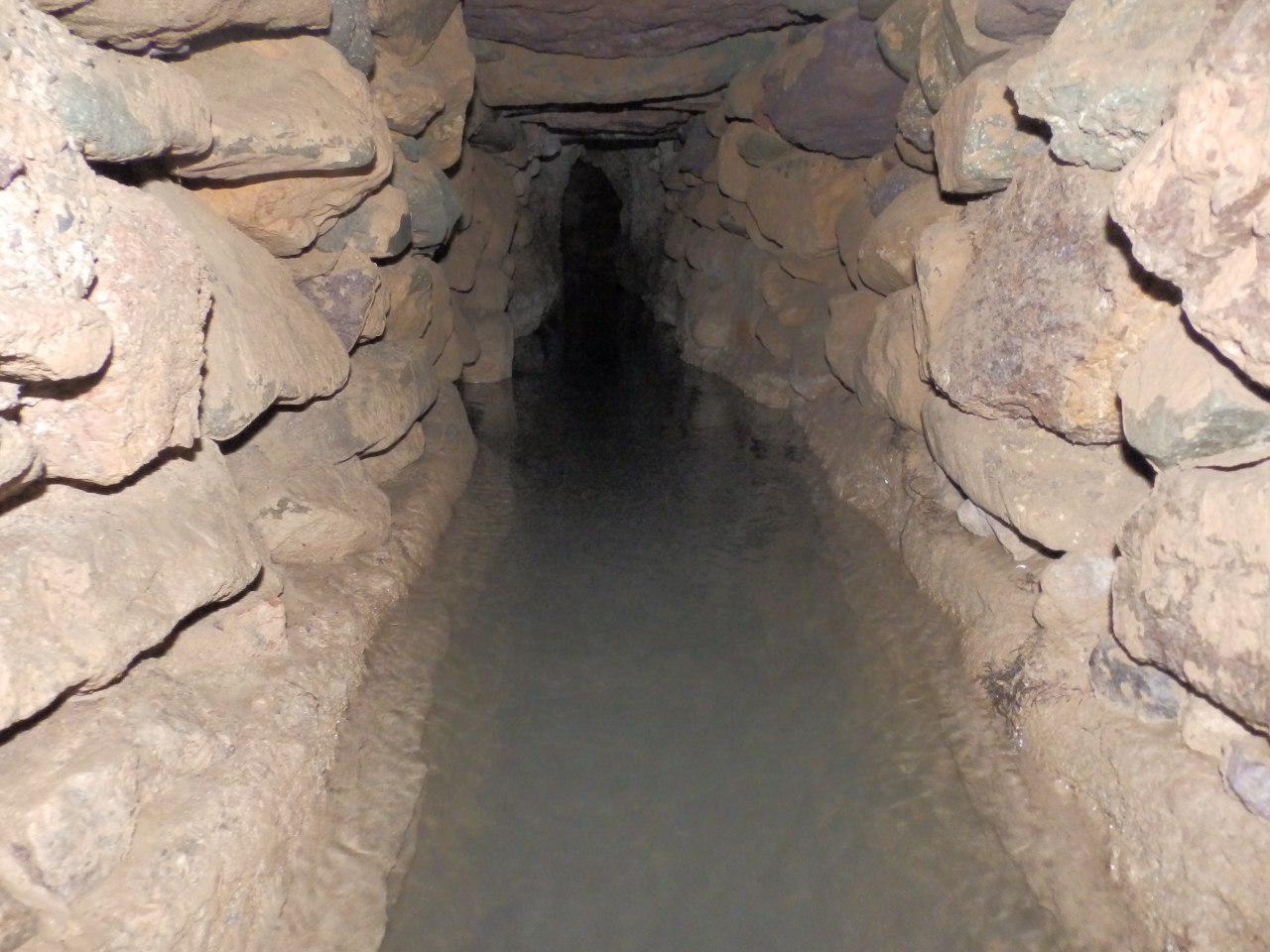
Kariz Zebad

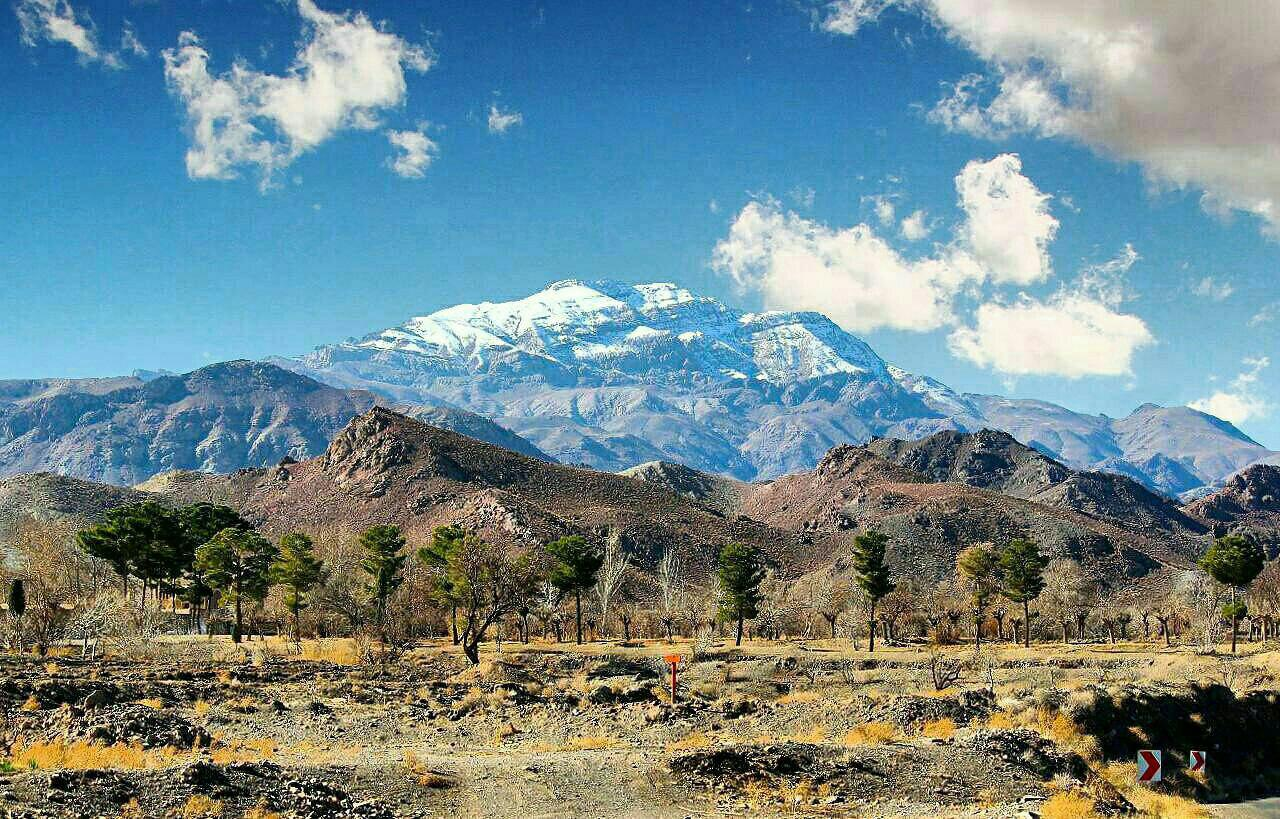
zibad Mountain

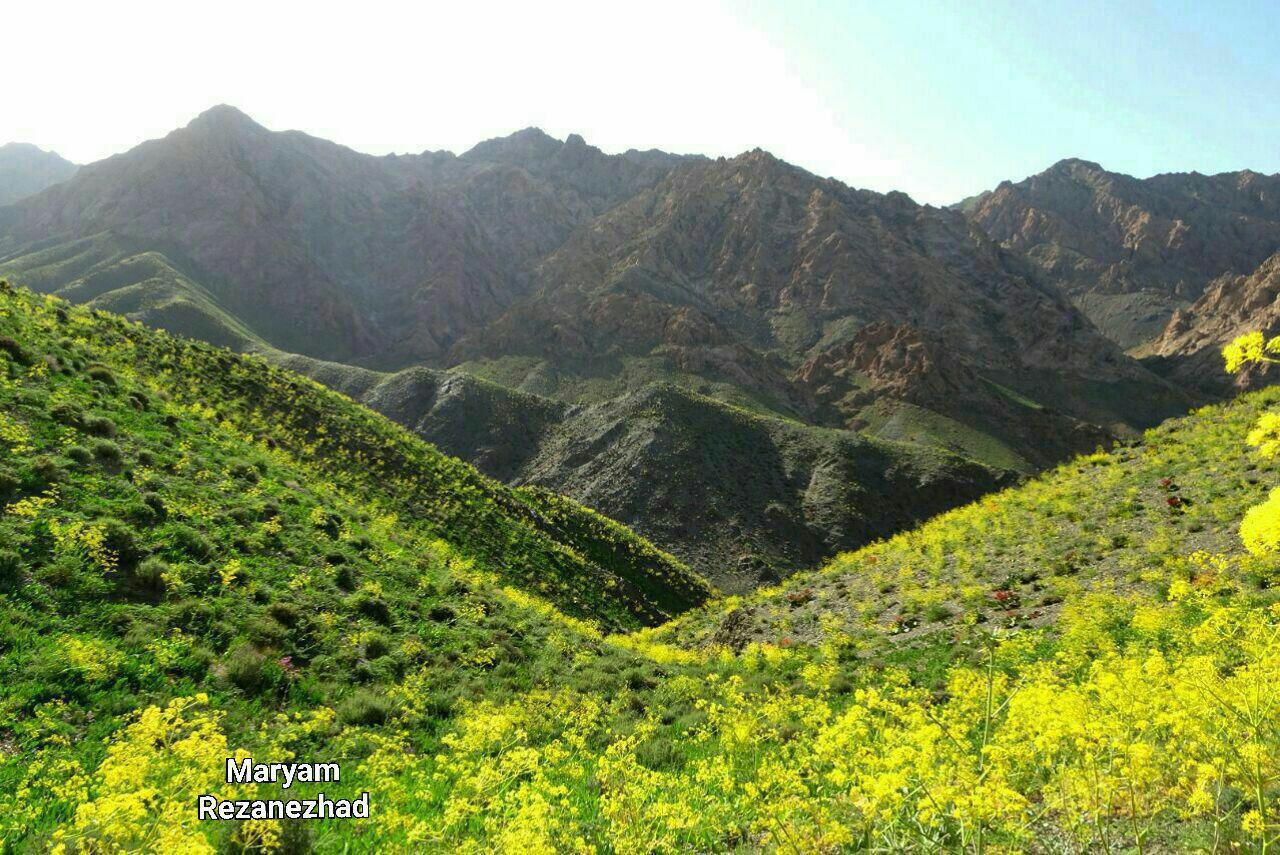
Ferula Zibad

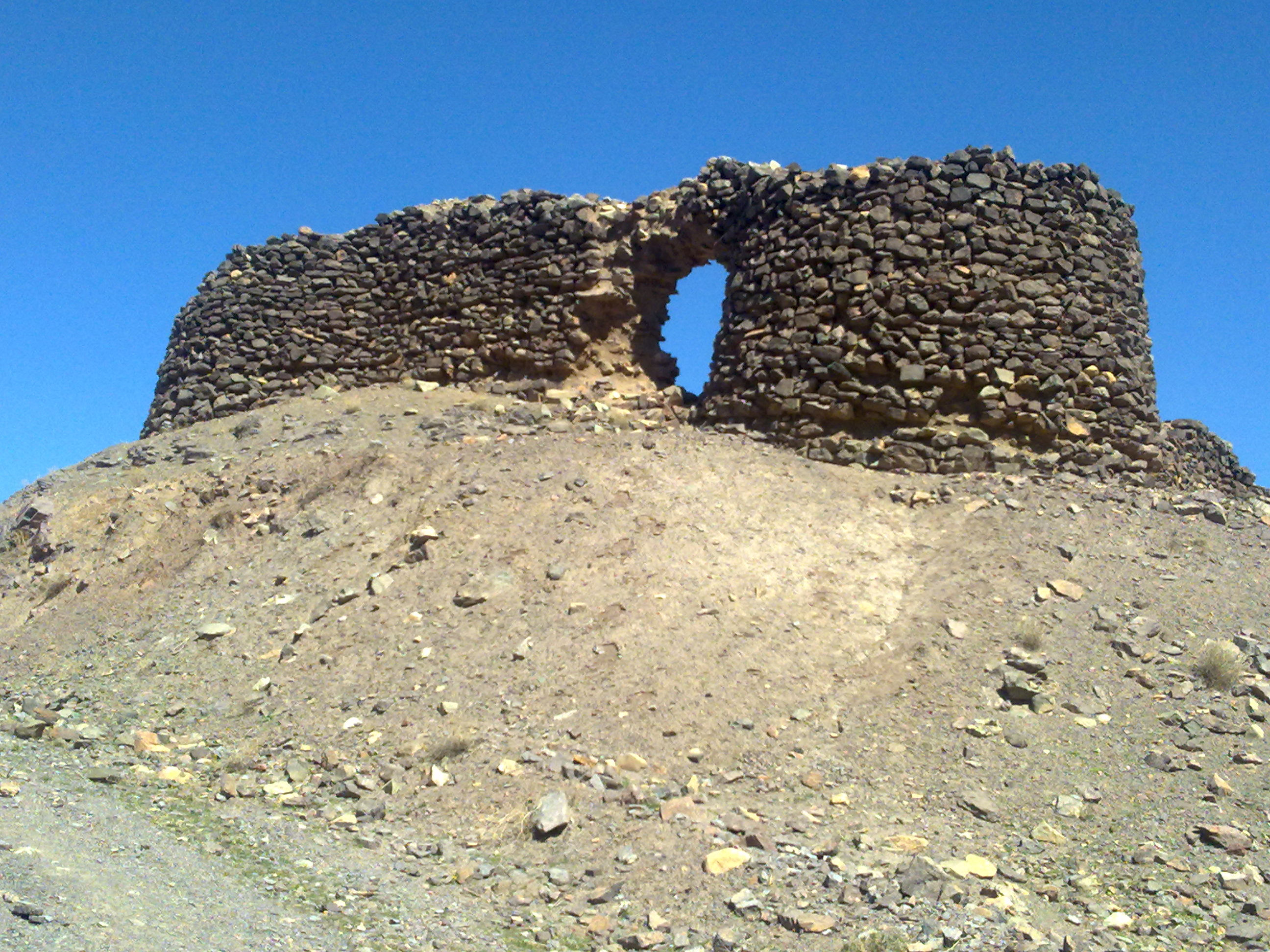
Sassanian Castel

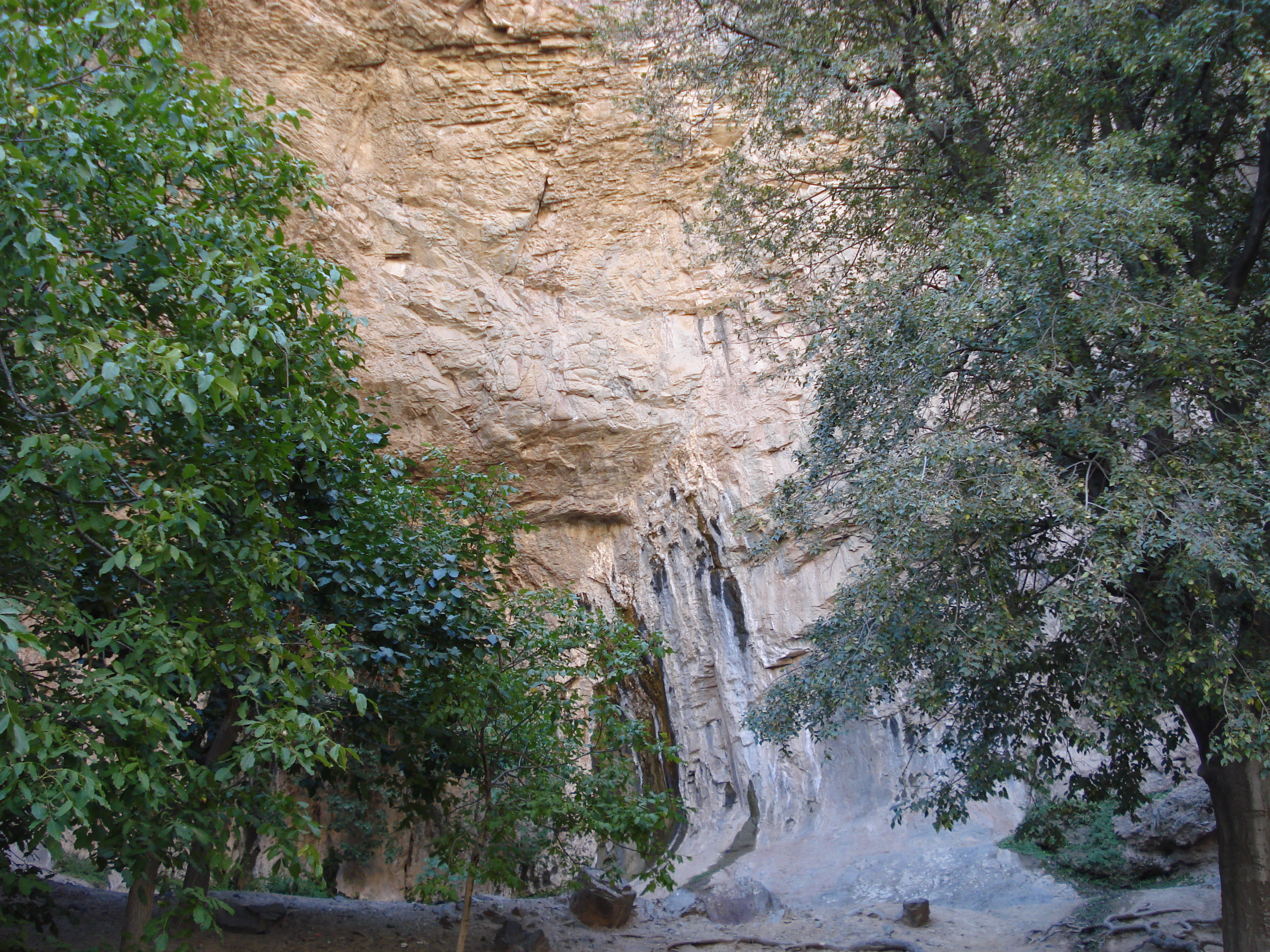
Soufe Zibad

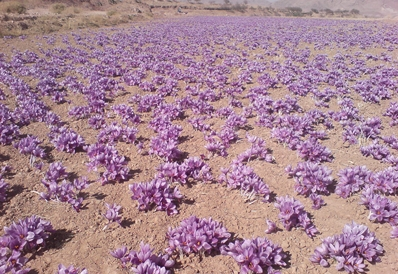

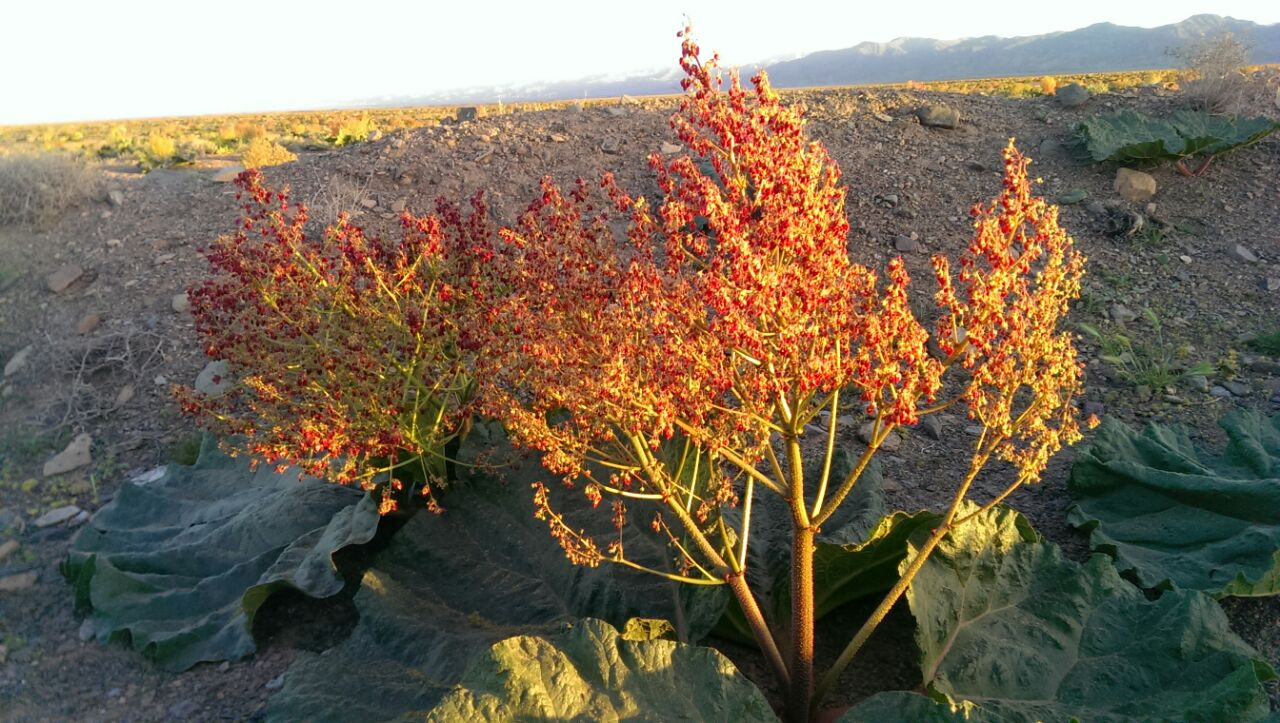
Rivas zibad

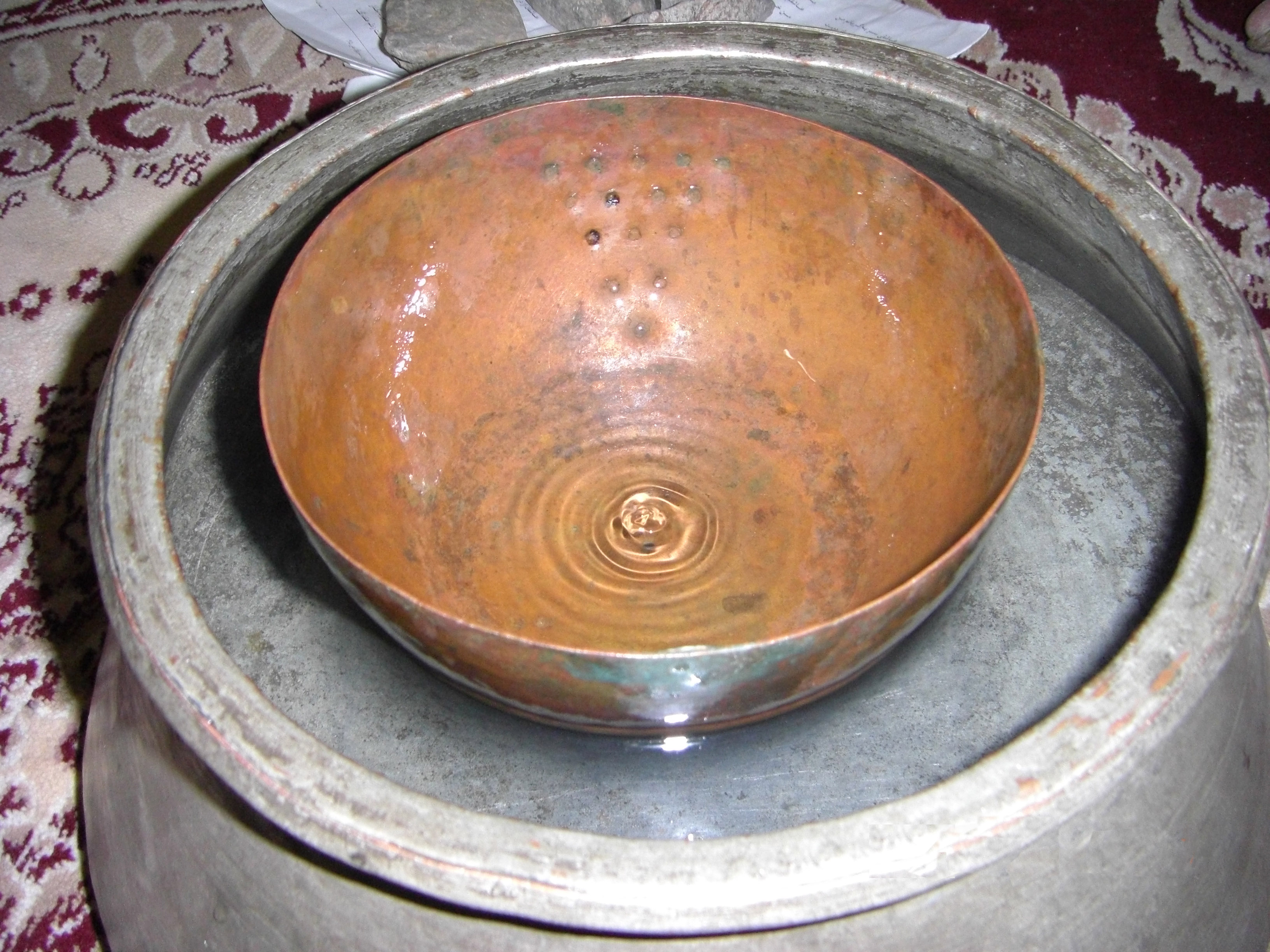
Ancient water clock used in qanat of gonabad 2500 years ago

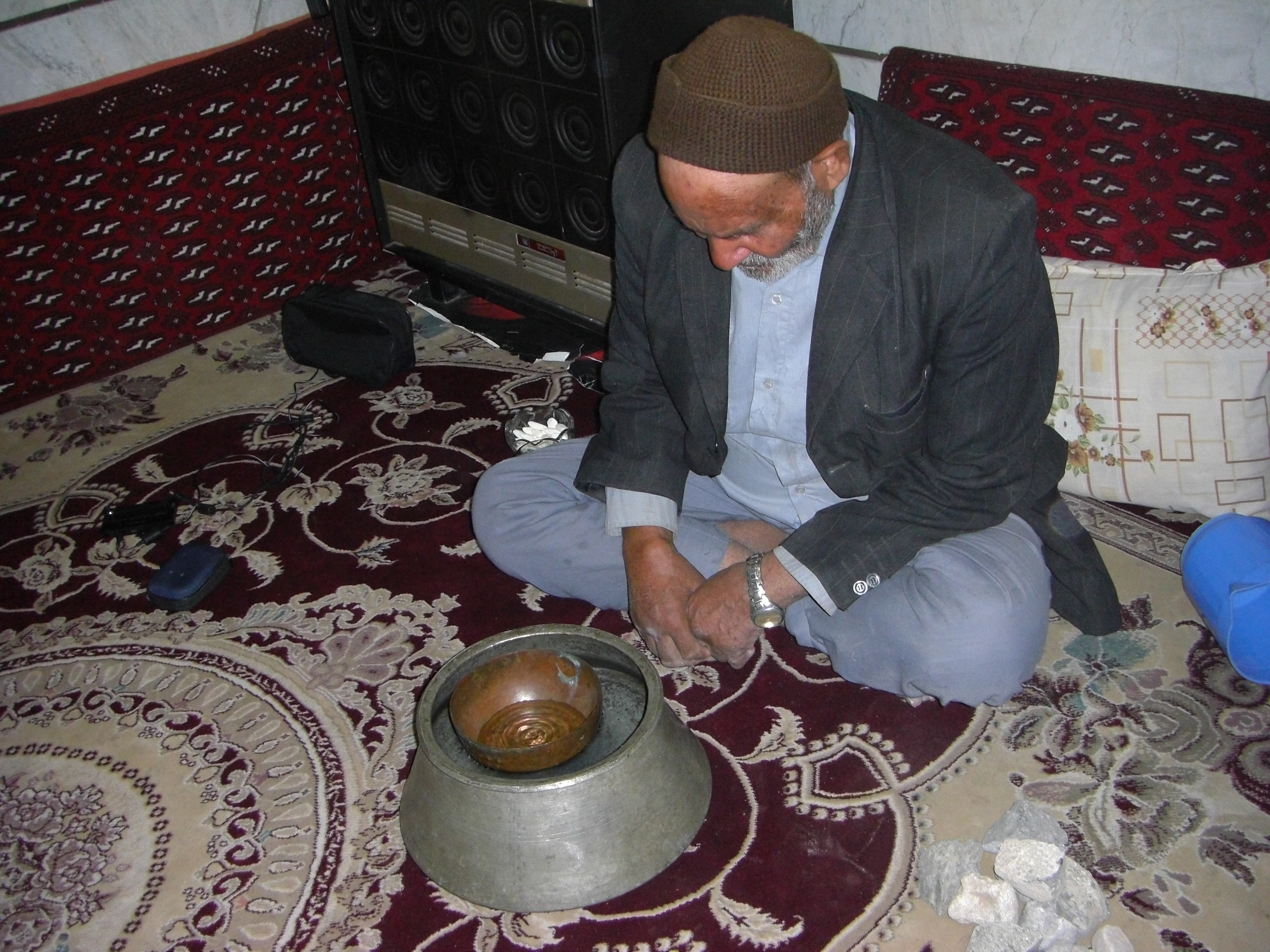
Reconstruction of the scene with a real manager of the water clock, Iran

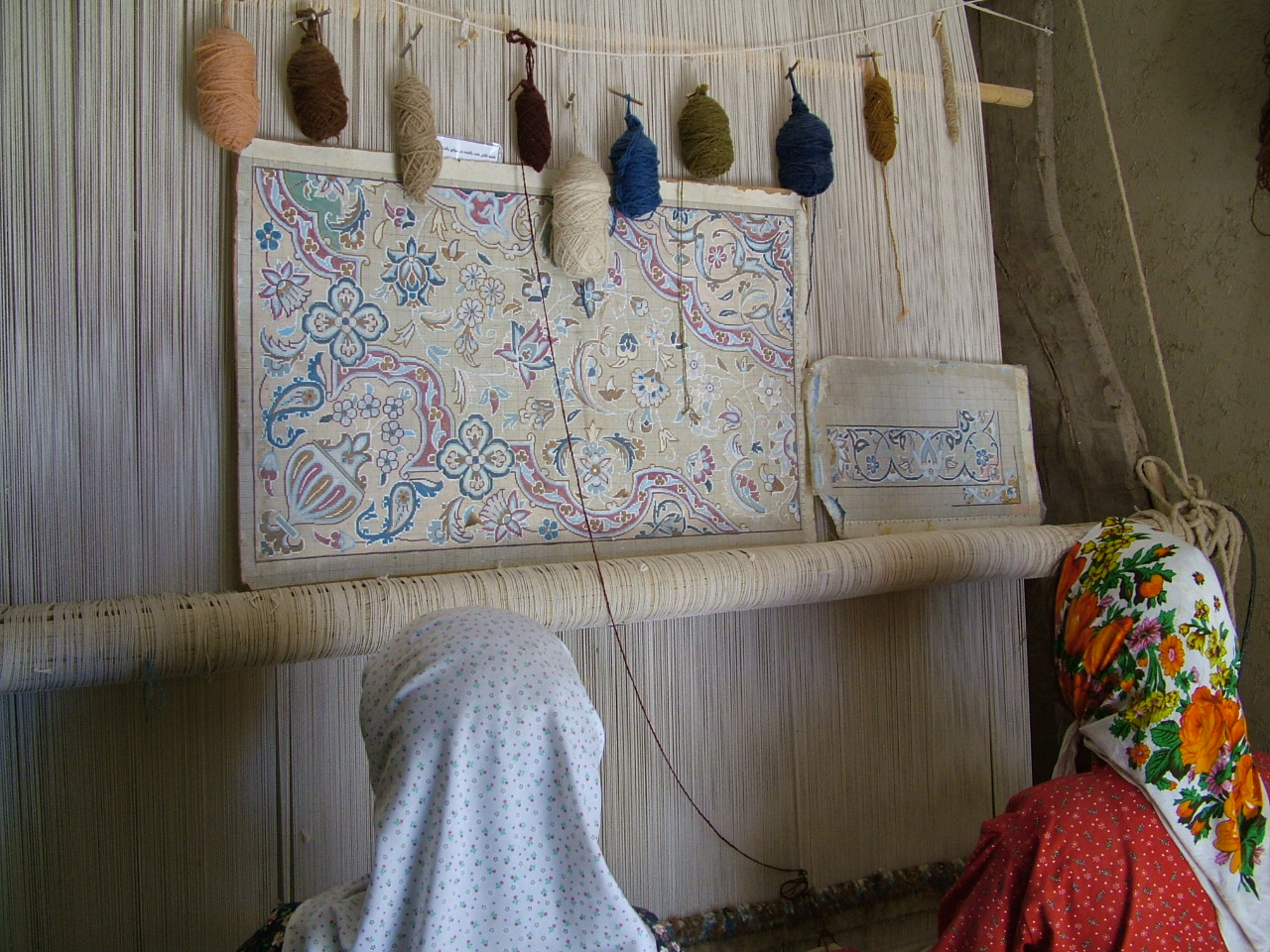

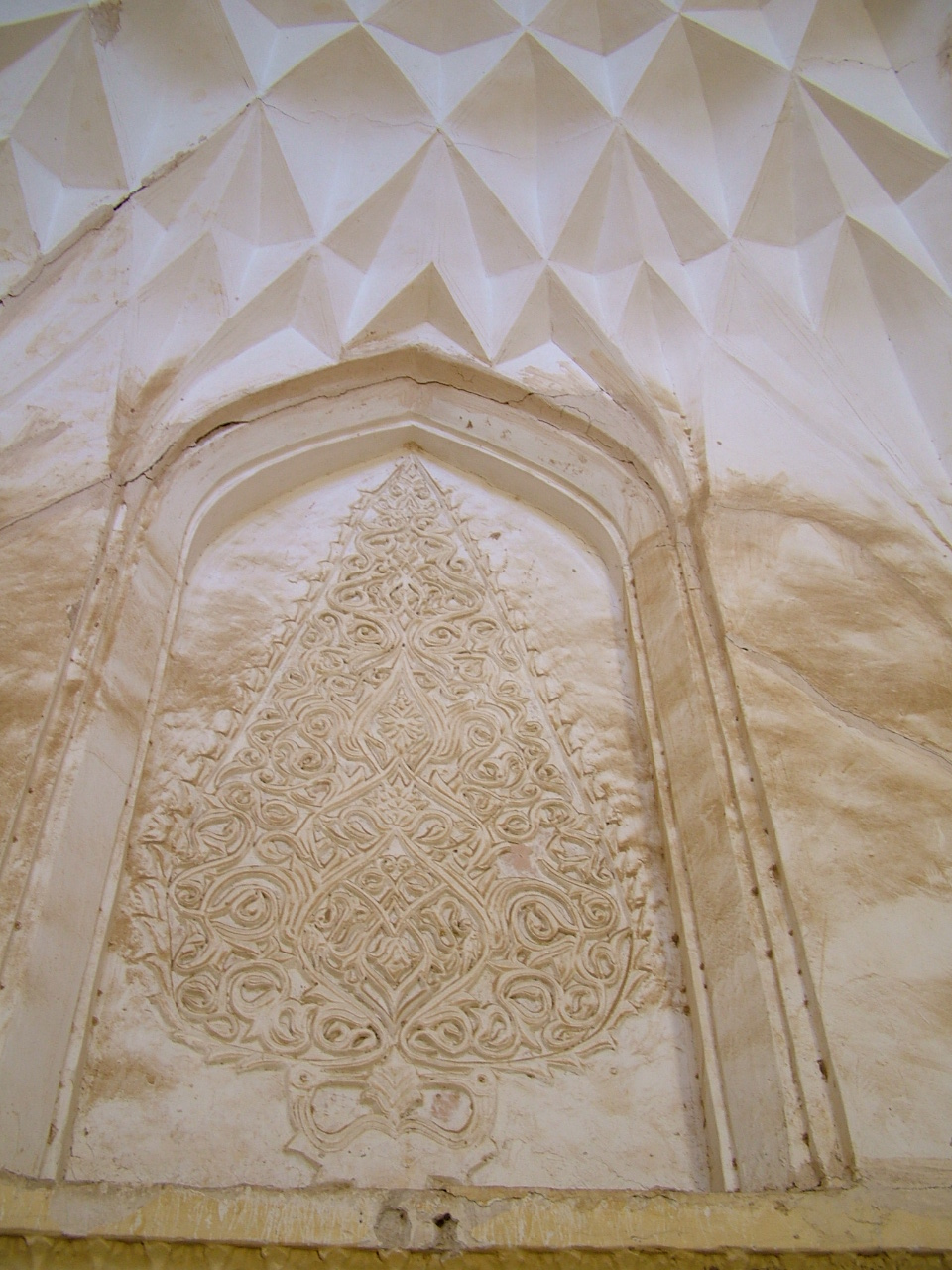

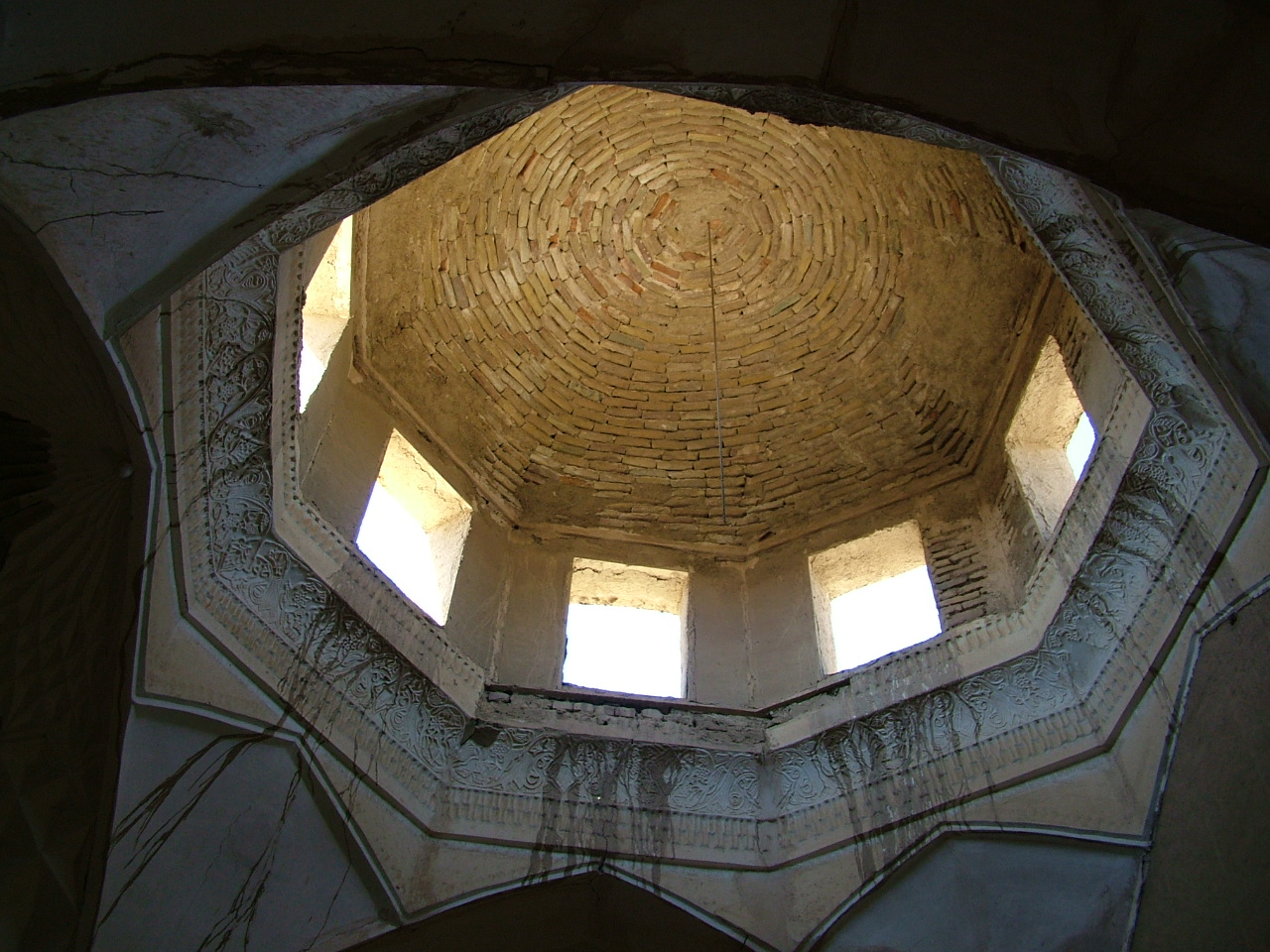

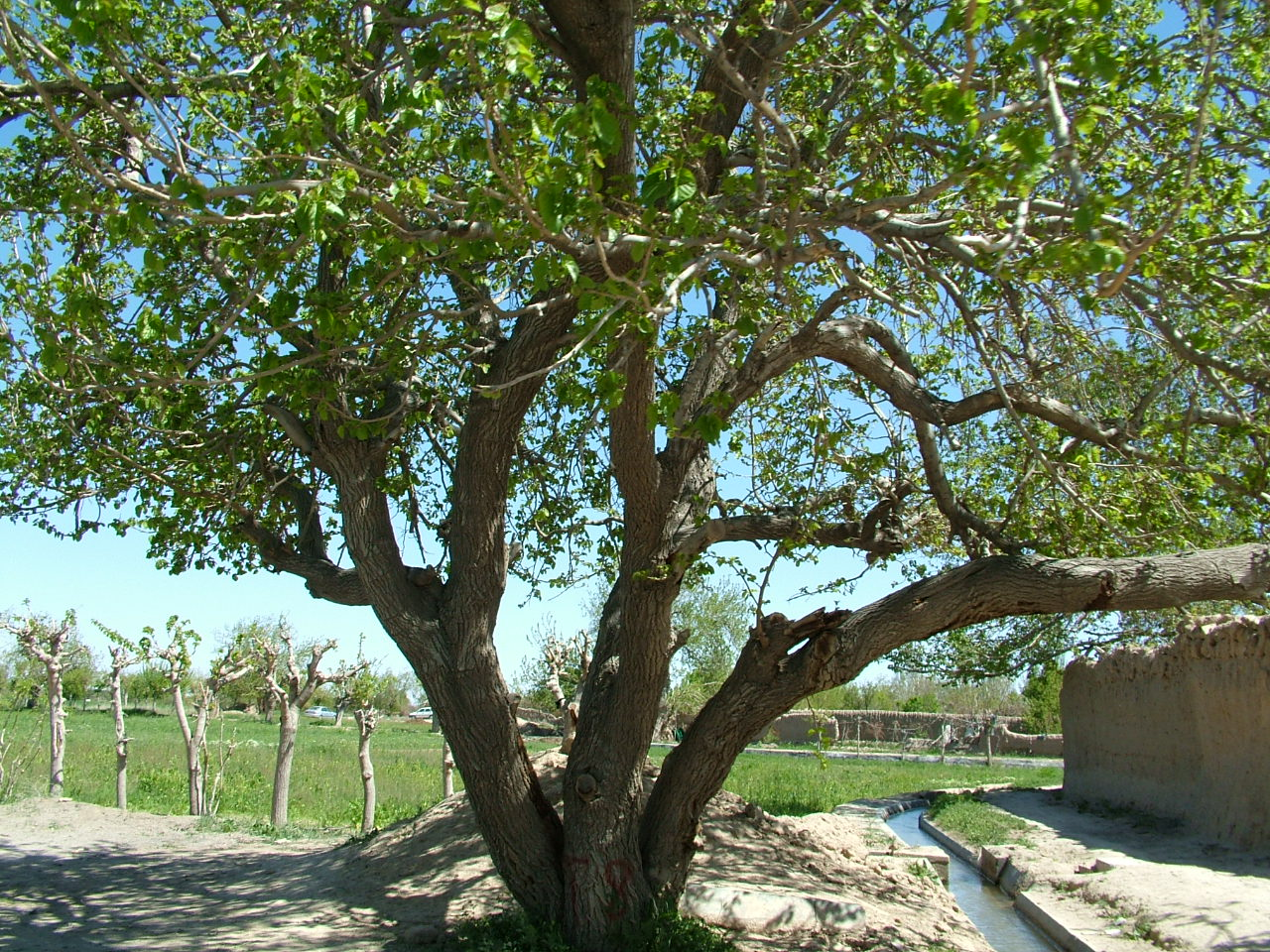

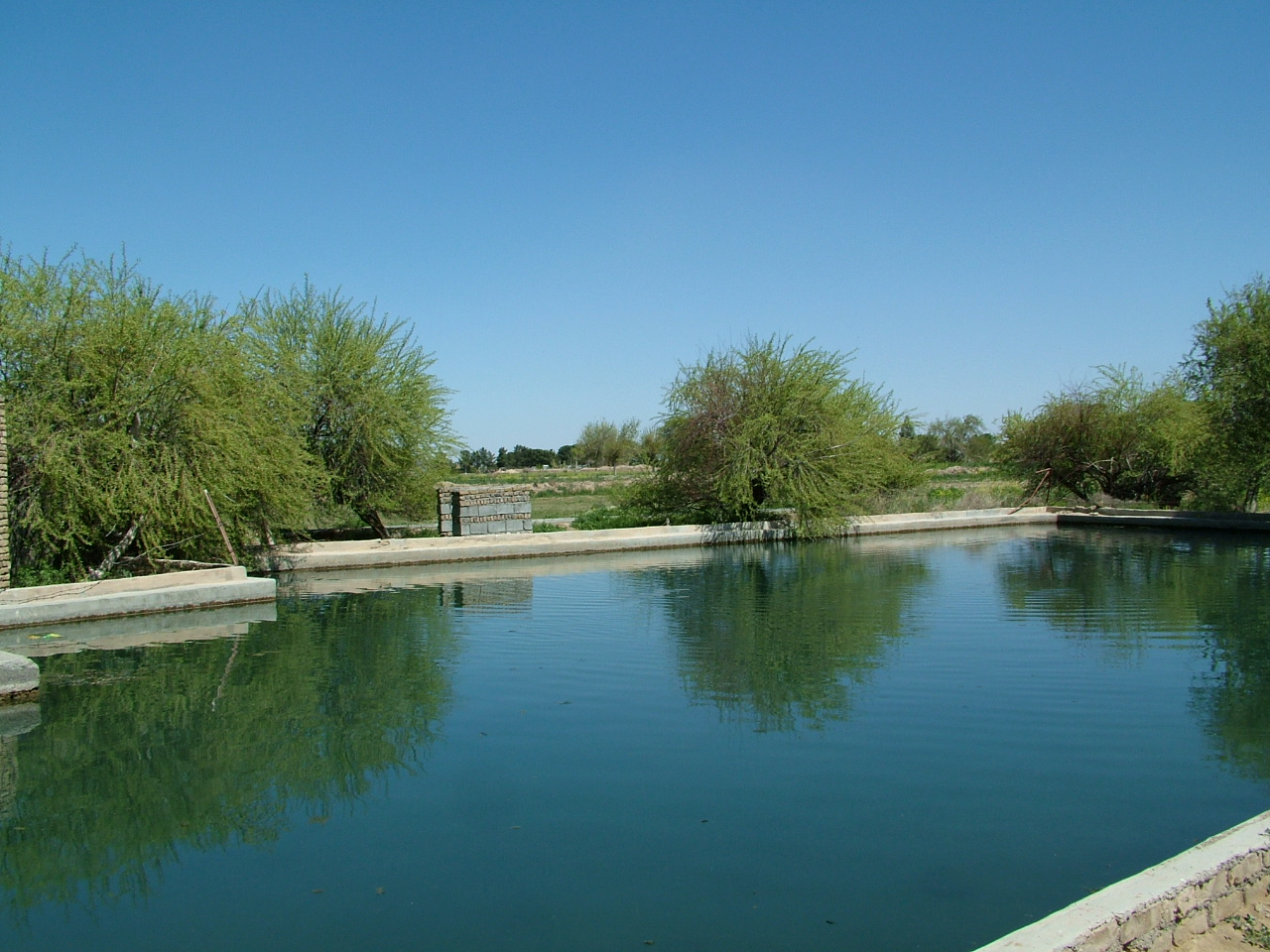

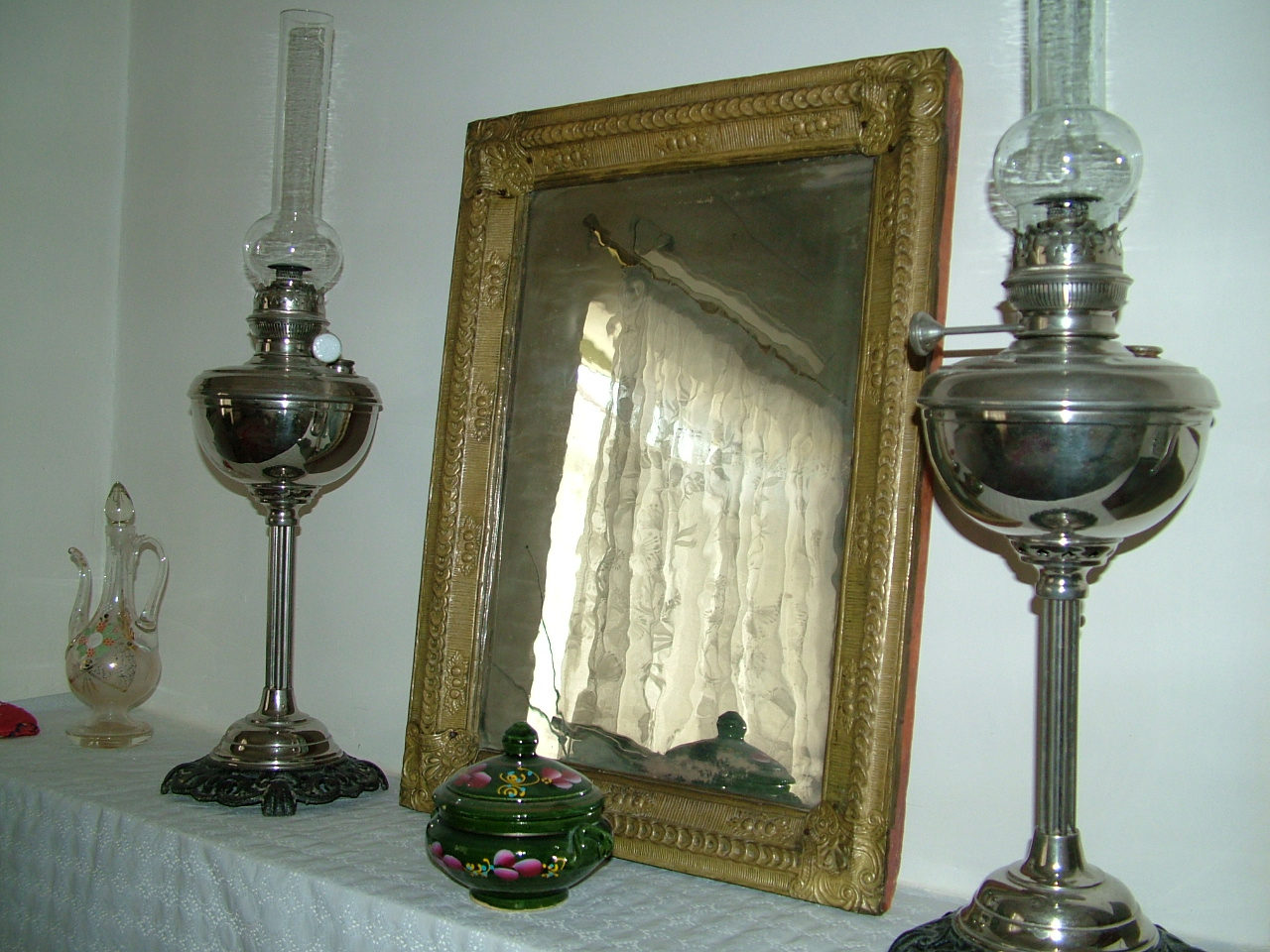
