= Mahoe Suri =

Afghan aristocrat, marzban of Merv, Sasanian Empire (7th century AD)

Māhōē Sūrī, known in Islamic sources as Māhūy Sūrī, was an Iranian aristocrat, who served as the marzbān (general of a frontier province, "margrave") of Merv during the reign of the last Sasanian king of kings Yazdegerd III (r. 632–651).

== Biography ==
Mahoe was probably from the House of Suren, one of the seven Parthian clans of the Sasanian state. During the Islamic invasion of Iran, Yazdegerd III went to refuge in Merv; when he arrived to the city along with his army chief Farrukhzad, Mahoe warmly received them. However, Farrukhzad did not stay for long and mutinied against Yazdegerd and left the city. Mahoe used this opportunity to secretly plot with the Hephthalite ruler Nizak against Yazdegerd, who, however, discovered the plot and fled from Mahoe's residence. He was eventually assassinated in a mill by an assassin sent by Mahoe.

Meanwhile, the Muslims were seizing eastern parts of the fallen Iran, and Mahoe was in the end forced to make peace with the Muslims and pay tribute. During the reign of the caliph Ali (656–661), a complaint about Mahoe's dehqans not paying tribute was sent to the latter, who then went to Kufa in Iraq. However, during Mahoe's arrival to the city, the inhabitants of Khorasan, who disliked the governorship of Mahoe, revolted. After this, Mahoe is no longer mentioned in any source.

== Sources ==
- Zarrinkub, Abd al-Husain (1975). "The Arab conquest of Iran and its aftermath". The Cambridge History of Iran, Volume 4: From the Arab Invasion to the Saljuqs. Cambridge: Cambridge University Press. pp. 1–57. ISBN 978-0-521-20093-6.
- Morony, M. (1986). "ʿARAB ii. Arab conquest of Iran". Encyclopaedia Iranica, Vol. II, Fasc. 2. pp. 203–210.
- Pourshariati, Parvaneh (2008). Decline and Fall of the Sasanian Empire: The Sasanian-Parthian Confederacy and the Arab Conquest of Iran. London and New York: I.B. Tauris. ISBN 978-1-84511-645-3.
