= List of Albanians in Italy =

List of prominent people of Albanian descent associated with Italy

This list features prominent people of full or partial Albanian descent associated with Italy, including members of the Arbëreshë community and Albanians who have established careers or made significant contributions in the country. The entries are arranged by occupation.

== History and politics ==
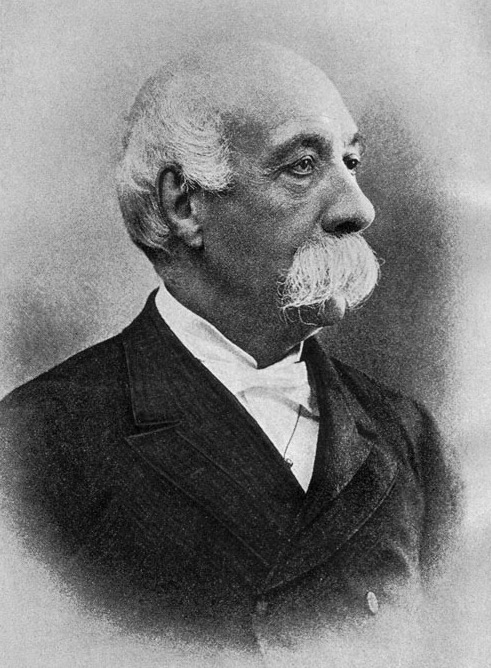
Francesco Crispi served as Prime Minister of Italy from 1887 to 1891 and again from 1893 to 1896.

- Antonio Gramsci – philosopher, writer, politician and political theorist; founding member and leader of the Communist Party of Italy.
- Basilio Giordano – senator.
- Francesco Crispi – politician and statesman who served as Prime Minister of Italy from 1887 to 1891 and again from 1893 to 1896; one of the principal figures of the Risorgimento.
- Giuseppe Salvatore Bellusci – politician.
- Giacomo Vuxani – politician.
- Marco Osnato – politician.
- Mario Tanassi – deputy prime minister of Italy.
- Nicola Barbato – physician and politician; one of the founders and leaders of the Fasci Siciliani movement.
- Pasquale Scura — jurist, magistrate and briefly Minister of Justice in the Kingdom of the Two Sicilies.
- Salvatore Mazzaracchio – politician.
- Stefano Rodotà – jurist, academic and politician; president of the Democratic Party of the Left from 1991 to 1992.
- Terenzio Tocci – lawyer and politician who served as a minister and held other senior government positions in Albania.

== Military ==
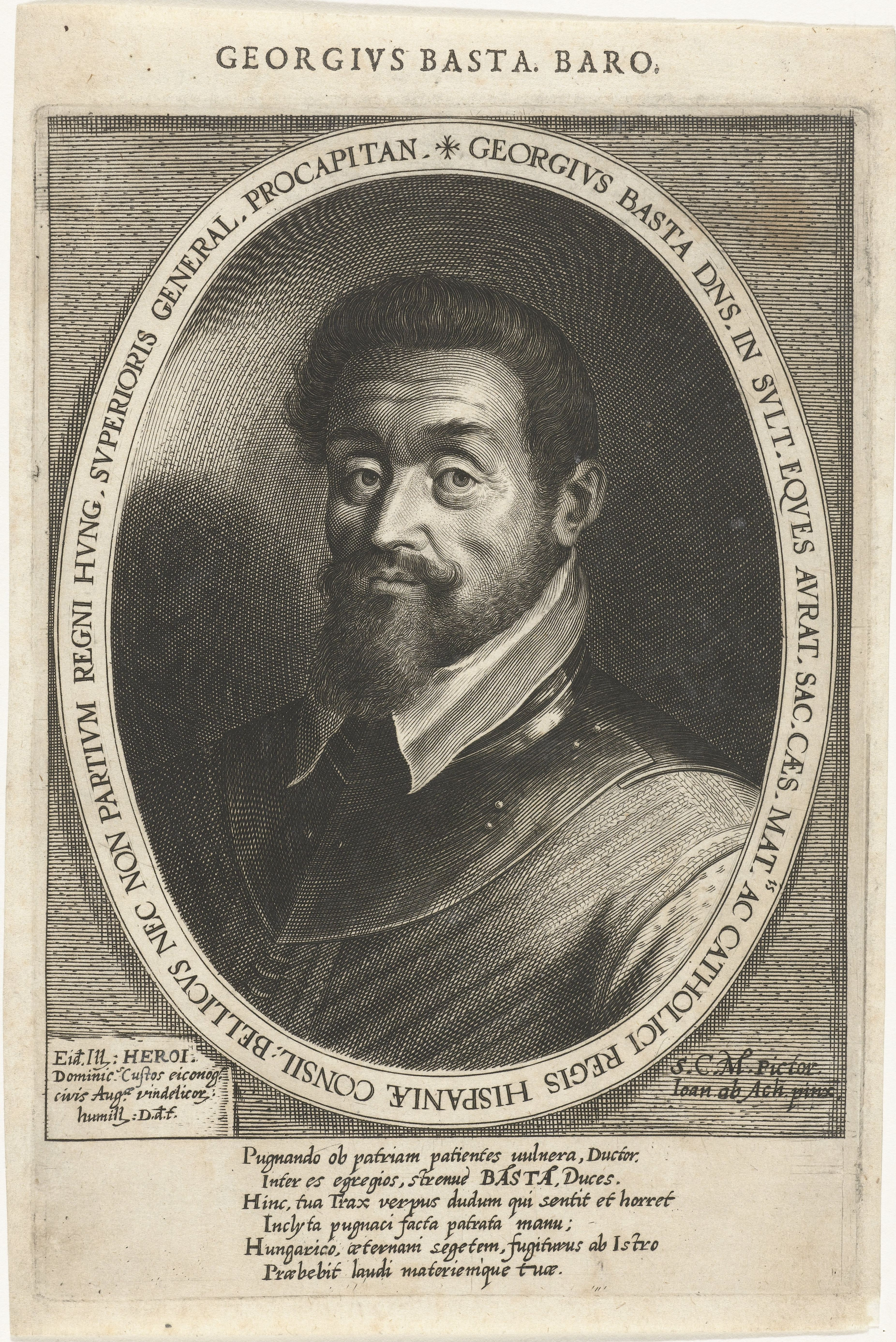
Giorgio Basta became Field Marshal and Governor of Upper Hungary under Emperor Rudolf II, later being granted the title of Imperial Count in 1605.

- Attanasio Dramis – military officer and participant in the Risorgimento who later commanded the Calabrian National Guard.
- Demetrio Capuzzimati – stradioti captain in Apulia, then part of the Kingdom of Naples.
- Demetrio Reres – nobleman and stradioti commander associated with the early Albanian settlements in southern Italy.
- Giorgio Basta – general of the Holy Roman Empire and commander of Albanian cavalry.
- Hadji Alia – pirate lord and maritime commander.
- Khoja Zufar – captain, governor, merchant and General
- Mark Gjini – stradioti captain who served the Republic of Venice.
- Mercurio Bua – condottiero and stradioti captain who served the Republic of Venice and other European powers during the Italian Wars.
- Teodoro Crescia – stradioti captain who served in the Habsburg armies in Italy, Flanders and Germany.
- Theodore Bua – stradioti captain who served in the military forces of the Republic of Venice.
- Giovanni Renesi I – stradioti captain who served the Kingdom of Naples.
- Giovanni Renesi II – military captain and stradioti who served the Republic of Venice and participated in anti-Ottoman military and intelligence activities.

== Business and finance ==
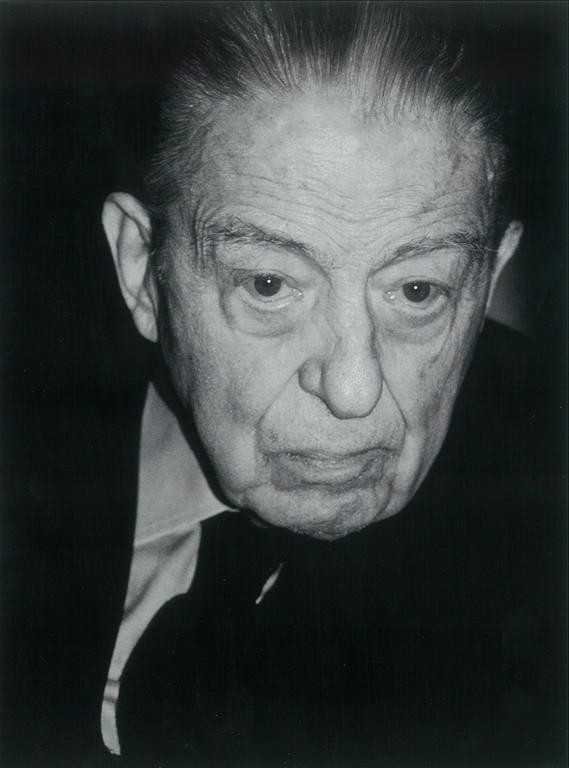
Enrico Cuccia was the founder of Mediobanca SpA and a significant figure in the history of capitalism in Italy.

- Bernardino Vitali – printer.
- Enrico Cuccia – banker, founder and long-serving managing director of Mediobanca, and an important figure in Italian post-war finance and industrial reconstruction.
- Gennaro Scura – entrepreneur and transport executive associated with IAS Autolinee and IAS Touring in Calabria.
- Giuseppe Borsci – entrepreneur associated with the development of the rum-based amaro Elisir San Marzano Borsci.
- Pasquale Librandi – entrepreneur associated with the Librandi family olive-growing enterprise in Calabria.

== Science and academia ==
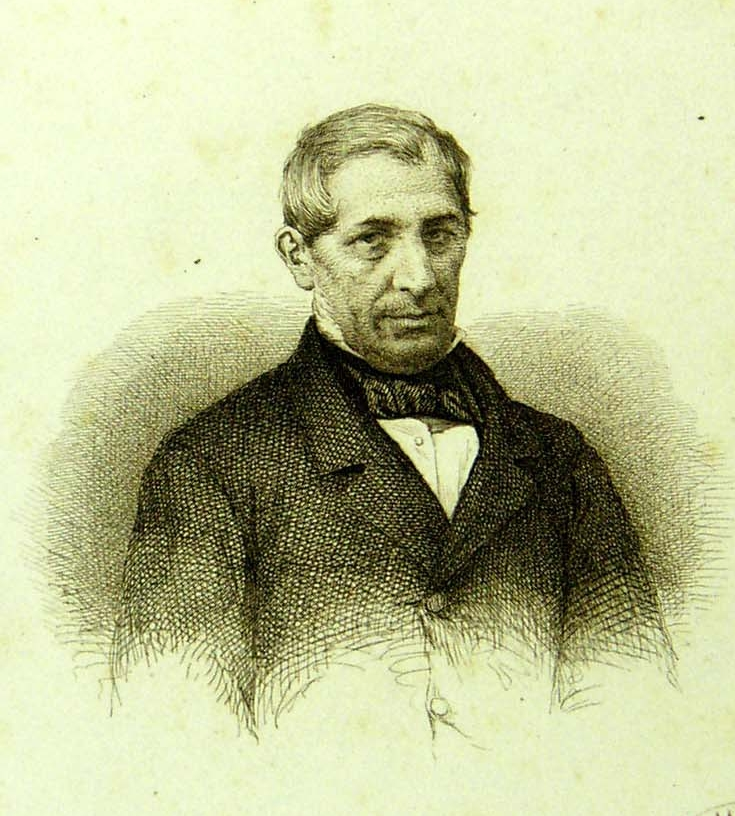
Luigi Giura designed the first suspension bridge in Continental Europe, in 1832.

- Angelo Masci – Arbëresh jurist and scholar whose works examined Albanian history, language, customs and society.
- Antonio Rodotà – engineer and space-industry executive who served as Director General of the European Space Agency from 1997 to 2003.
- Carmelo Candreva – writer and intellectual associated with the Arbëresh cultural movement.
- Costantino Mortati – jurist and constitutional scholar.
- Elena Cornaro Piscopia – philosopher and scholar who became the first woman to receive a university degree.
- Francesco Altimari – scholar and professor specializing in Albanology, Albanian language and Arbëresh culture.
- Gabriele Buccola – psychologist and psychiatrist of Arbëreshë origin whose experimental research contributed to the development of psychology in Italy.
- Gaetano Petrotta – philologist and linguist who taught Albanian language and literature at the University of Palermo.
- Giuseppe Crispi – Priest and philologist, one of the major figures of the Arbëresh community of Sicily of his time.
- Marco La Piana – scholar.
- Matteo Mandalà – scholar and professor of Albanian language and literature at the University of Palermo.
- Pasquale Scutari – linguist and Albanologist.
- Renato Miracco – scholar, art critic and curator.
- Vito Matranga – linguist and professor at the University of Palermo specializing in Italo-Albanian dialectology and Arbëresh linguistic varieties.

== Literature and publishing ==
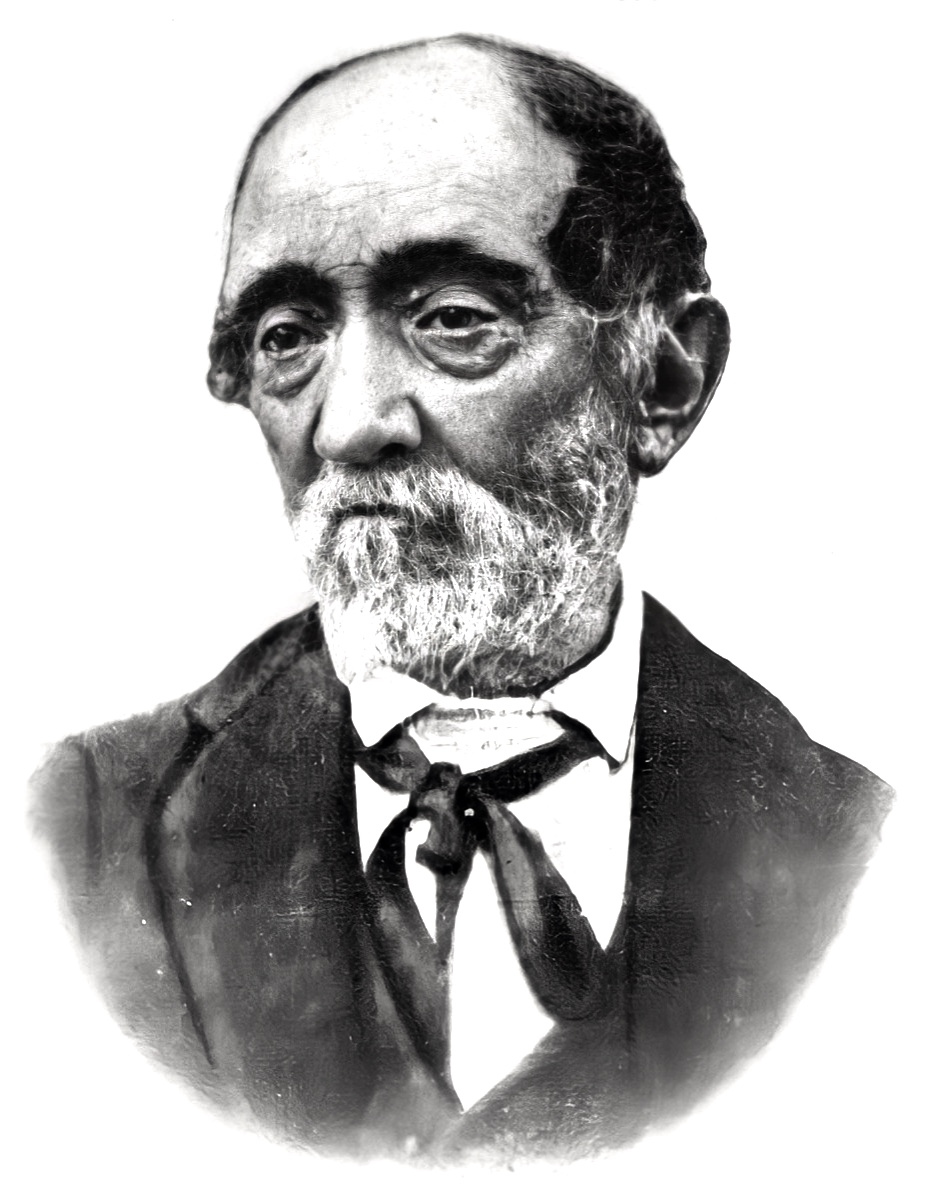
Girolamo de Rada was one of the leading writers of the 19th-century Albanian National Revival.

- Anselmo Lorecchio – poet and writer.
- Bernardo Bilotta – priest, poet and folklorist.
- Bernardino Vitali – Albanian printer and publisher active in Venice from 1494 to 1539; his workshop published numerous works by Venetian humanists.
- Carmine Abate – novelist and short-story writer whose work frequently explores Arbëresh identity and migration.
- Demetrio Camarda – Byzantine-rite priest, Albanian-language scholar, historian and philologist, and an important figure in 19th-century Albanian and Arbëresh studies.
- Vorea Ujko – priest and poet.
- Francesco Antonio Santori – writer, playwright and poet associated with the Albanian National Awakening.
- Francesco Crispi Glaviano – poet and folklorist from Palazzo Adriano.
- Francesco Saluto – writer of legal essays and cultural figure of the Arbëresh community of Piana degli Albanesi.
- Gabriele Dara – politician and poet, regarded as one of the early writers of the Albanian National Awakening.
- Gabriele Dara Jr. – poet and writer, best known for the epic poem Kënga e sprasëme e Balës.
- Gennaro Placco – poet.
- Giovanni Emanuele Bidera – writer.
- Girolamo de Rada – writer, scholar and major figure of the Albanian National Awakening.
- Giuseppe Camarda – writer and translator, known for his translation of the Gospel of Matthew into the Piana Arbëresh dialect.
- Giuseppe Schirò – poet, linguist, publicist, historian and folklorist, and one of the leading figures of 19th-century Arbëreshë literature.
- Giuseppe Schirò Di Maggio – poet, journalist, essayist, playwright and writer, and a prominent figure in contemporary Arbëreshë literature.
- Giuseppe Schirò di Modica – poet and essayist.
- Giuseppe Serembe – lyric poet and an important figure of 19th-century Arbëresh literature.
- Giuseppe Spata – writer and scholar.
- Giuseppina Demetra Schirò – poet and writer from Piana degli Albanesi.
- Giulio Variboba – poet and priest, and an early representative of Arbëresh literature.
- Kristina Gentile Mandala – Arbëresh writer and folklorist who worked to preserve the ethnographic and literary heritage of Piana degli Albanesi.
- Leonardo Lala – writer.
- Leonardo Lala Narduci – writer from Contessa Entellina.
- Luca Matranga – Byzantine-rite priest and writer, author of the 1592 Christian Doctrine, one of the earliest known works of Albanian literature from the Arbëresh community of Sicily.
- Maria Antonia Braile – Italo-Albanian writer and an early woman writer to publish literature in Albanian.
- Mario Bellizzi – poet and writer.
- Nicola Brancato – poet whose work reflected religious and popular traditions.
- Nicola Camarda – Arbëresh writer and translator of Greek classical works.
- Nicola Chetta – Byzantine rite priest, writer and poet.
- Ofelia Giudicissi Curci – poet and archaeologist.
- Paolo Schirò – bishop, writer and Albanologist who discovered the Missal of Gjon Buzuku and published the Arbëresh-language newspaper Fiala e t'in'Zoti.
- Pasquale Renda – contemporary Arbëresh poet.
- Pietro Matranga – writer, priest and classical scholar.
- Trifonio Guidera – poet whose work reflected religious and popular traditions.
- Vincenzo Dorsa – Arbëresh scholar, writer and translator who studied Albanian language, history and culture.
- Zef Chiaramonte Musacchia – poet and writer.

== Religion ==
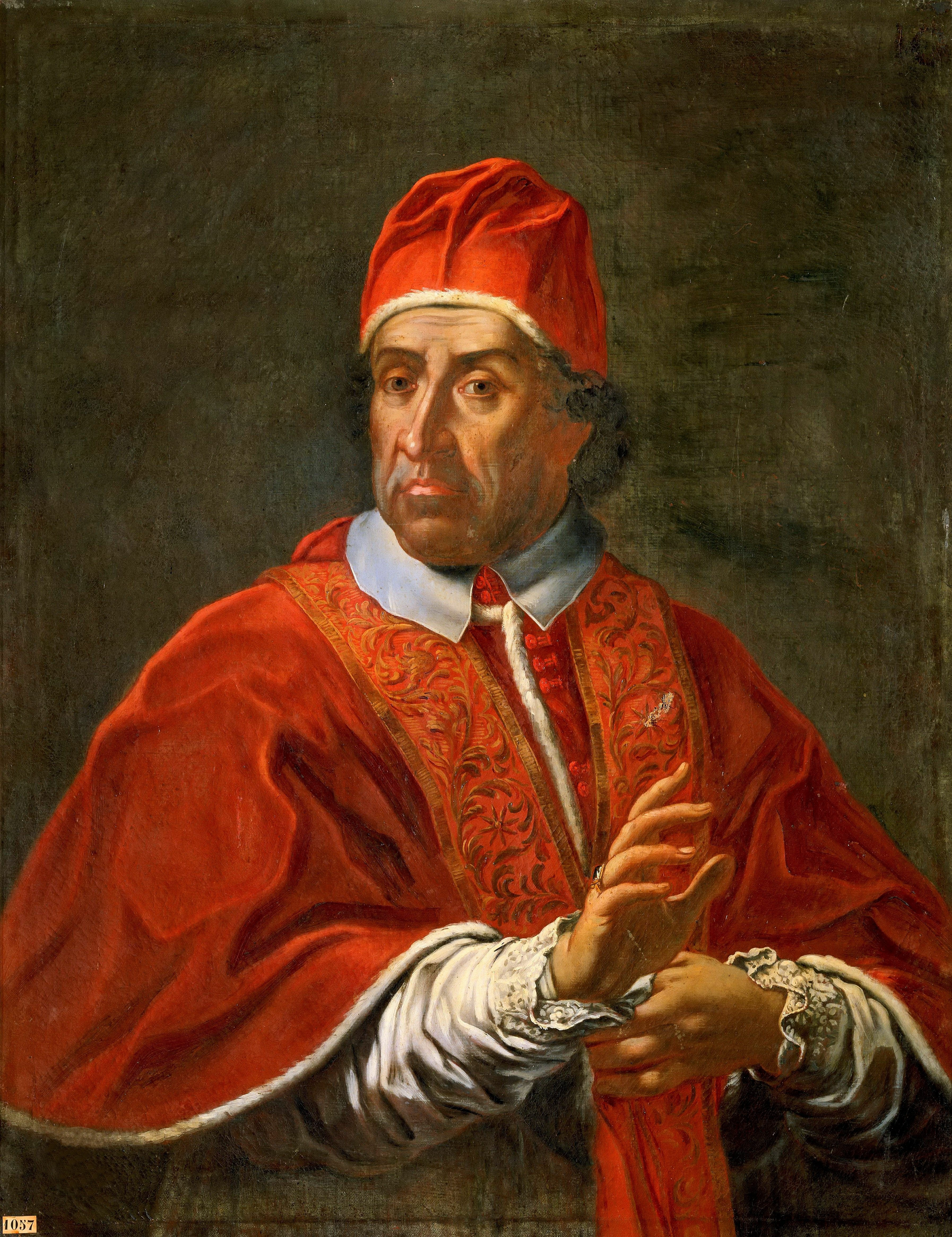
Pope Clement XI was head of the papal states from 1700 until his passing in 1721.

- Alessandro Albani – Italian cardinal, papal administrator and patron of the arts; member of the Albani family, traditionally regarded as having Albanian origins.
- Angelo Massafra – Italian-born Albanian Catholic archbishop of Shkodër–Pult and member of the Arbëresh community of San Marzano di San Giuseppe.
- Annibale Albani – Italian cardinal, bishop and ecclesiastical administrator; nephew of Pope Clement XI.
- Donato Oliverio – bishop of the Eparchy of Lungro, the Italo-Albanian Byzantine Catholic eparchy in Calabria.

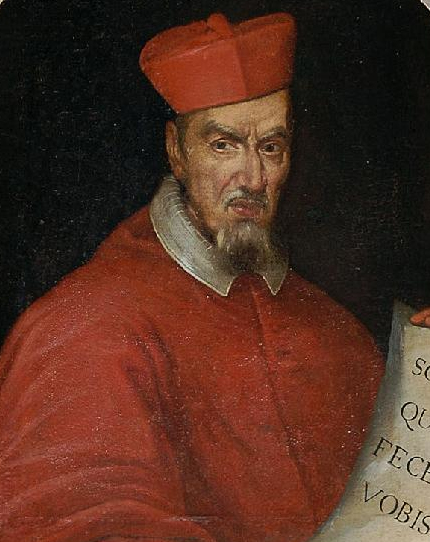
Stefano Durazzo served as Archbishop of Genoa for three decades. His family lineage produced nine Doges and established the earliest theatres in the Republic.

- Eleuterio Francesco Fortino – priest of the Italo-Albanian Catholic Church and Archimandrite of Sant'Atanasio dei Greci in Rome.
- Ercole Lupinacci – bishop of the Eparchy of Piana degli Albanesi and later bishop of the Eparchy of Lungro.
- Ernest Simoni – Albanian Catholic priest and cardinal.
- Ferruccio Baffa Trasci – Italo-Albanian bishop, theologian and philosopher who served as bishop of Maximianopolis.
- Gian Francesco Albani – Italian cardinal and bishop who served as dean of the College of Cardinals.
- Gian Girolamo Albani – Italian Roman Catholic cardinal, jurist and ecclesiastical administrator.
- Giorgio Guzzetta – priest and founder of the Arbëreshë Seminary of Palermo.
- Giovanni Mele – first bishop of the Eparchy of Lungro, the Italo-Albanian Byzantine Catholic eparchy in Calabria.
- Giovanni Stamati – bishop of the Eparchy of Lungro and hierarch of the Italo-Albanian Catholic Church.
- Giuseppe Albani – Italian cardinal and papal statesman who served as Cardinal Secretary of State under Pope Pius VIII.
- Giuseppe Perniciaro – first residential bishop of the Eparchy of Piana degli Albanesi.
- Giuseppe Schirò – Italo-Albanian Byzantine Catholic bishop and writer who served as Archbishop of Durrës.
- Nicola Figlia – Arbëresh Byzantine-rite priest, writer and translator of liturgical texts into Arbëresh.
- Pope Clement XI – Pope from 23 November 1700 until his death in 1721; born Giovanni Francesco Albani and a member of the Albani family.
- Sotir Ferrara – bishop of the Eparchy of Piana degli Albanesi, the Italo-Albanian Byzantine Catholic eparchy in Sicily.
- Stefano Durazzo – cardinal and Archbishop of Genoa; member of the Genoese Durazzo family, traditionally associated with Albanian origins.

== Arts and entertainment ==
=== Music ===
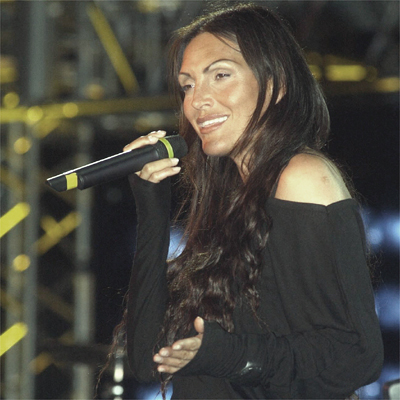
Anna Oxa is a two-time winner of the Sanremo Music Festival.

- Anna Oxa – singer, actress and television presenter, born to an Albanian father and an Italian mother.
- Anna Stratigò – singer, musician and songwriter associated with the preservation and performance of Arbëresh musical traditions.
- Bino – musician, percussionist and actor of Arbëresh origin.
- Elhaida Dani – singer-songwriter who established a career in Italy, including as winner of The Voice of Italy.
- Ermal Meta – singer-songwriter and composer.

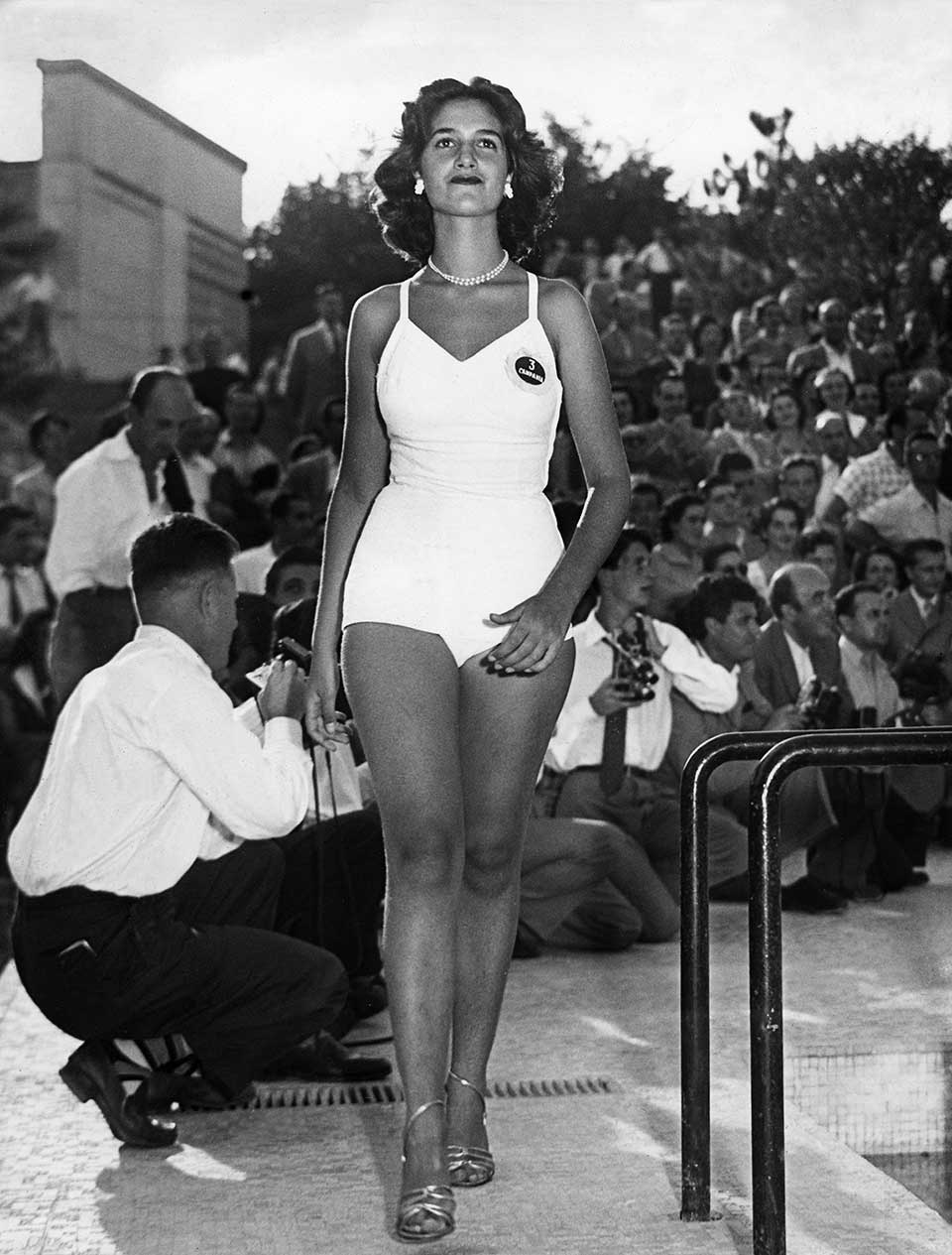
Anna Maria Bugliari was crowned Miss Italia in 1950, edging Sophia Loren who took second place.

- Giovanni Paisiello – composer, born in the Arbëreshë settlement of Roccaforzata.
- Joe Lala – musician, percussionist and actor of Albanian-American heritage.
- Salvatore Frega – composer of contemporary and experimental music.
- Tito Schipa – Italian tenor of Albanian descent.
- Tito Schipa Jr. – composer, singer-songwriter, producer, writer and actor.

=== Painting ===
- Enzo Domestico Kabregu – painter who later settled in Uruguay.
- Francesco Albani – baroque painter.
- Ibrahim Kodra – Albanian painter who spent much of his artistic career in Italy.
- Marco Basaiti – Renaissance painter of probable Albanian origin.
- Michele Greco da Valona – painter of the Adriatic Renaissance.
- Nik Spatari – painter, sculptor, architect and art scholar.
- Pietro Petta – 19th-century painter from Piana degli Albanesi and pupil of Giuseppe Patania.
- Xhovalin Delia – painter, film director and writer who lives and works in Florence.

== Sports ==
=== Football ===
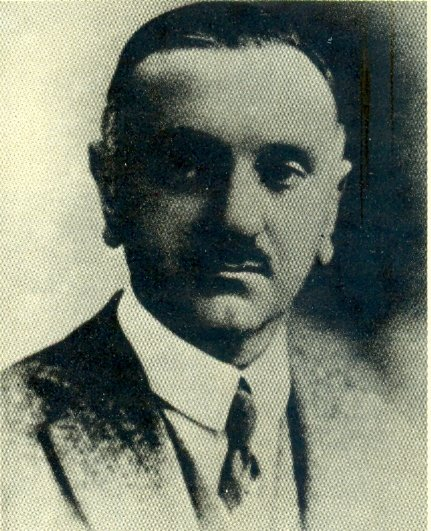
Giovanni Paramithiotti was the founder of Inter Milan and served as the club's first chairman.

- Ador Gjuci – footballer.
- Alessio Hyseni – footballer.
- Alessio Ruçi – footballer.
- Andrea Isufaj – footballer.
- Andrea Tripicchio – footballer.
- Angelo Ndrecka – footballer.
- Antonio Candreva – footballer
- Ardit Gashi – footballer.
- Emanuele Ndoj – footballer.
- Entonjo Elezaj – football player.
- Erjon Bogdani – footballer who played for several Italian clubs.
- Fabio Sakaj – footballer.
- Federico Zenuni – footballer.

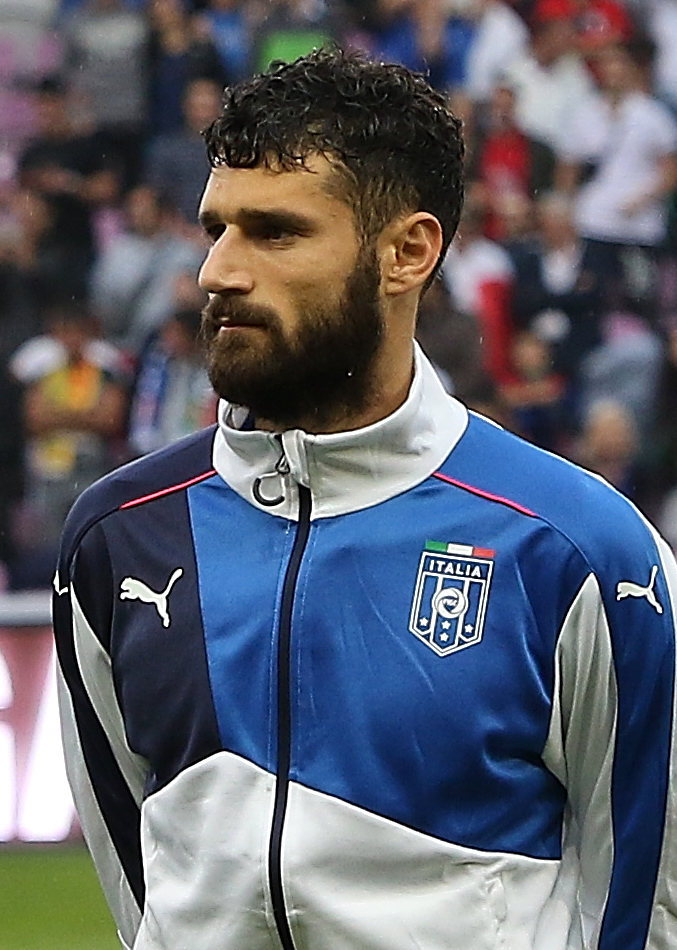
Antonio Candreva was capped 54 times for Italy's national football team.

- Giacomo Vrioni – footballer.
- Giovanni Paramithiotti – founder and chairman of Inter Milan.
- Giuseppe Bellusci – footballer.
- Igli Tare – footballer and football executive.
- Irlian Ceka – footballer.
- Ismet Sinani – footballer.
- Kastriot Dermaku – footballer.
- Kleto Gjura – footballer.
- Loro Boriçi – footballer who played for Lazio in Serie A.
- Luis Hasa – footballer.
- Marash Kumbulla – footballer.
- Naim Kryeziu – footballer who played for AS Roma and Napoli, winning the Serie A title with Roma in 1942.
- Riza Lushta – footballer who played for Bari, Juventus and Napoli, winning the Coppa Italia with Juventus in 1942.
- Shaqir Tafa – footballer.
- Thomas Strakosha – footballer who developed in Italy and played for Lazio.

=== Other sports ===
- Abramo Canka – professional basketball player.
- Andy Varipapa – professional bowler.
- Arjola Trimi – paralympic swimmer.
- Engjel Makelara – rugby union player.
- Françesko Xhaja – kickboxer.
- Ornel Gega – rugby union player.
- Klodeta Gjini – track and field athlete.
- Noel Borshi – swimmer.
- Lorela Cubaj – basketball player who played in the WNBA for the Atlanta Dream.
- Luca Shytaj – chess grandmaster and virologist.
