= Zirjan =

Zirjan or Zir Jan (Persian: زيرجان) may refer to:

- Zirjan, Gonabad
- Zirjan, Nishapur
