= Ruchi =

Ruchi may refer to:

- Ruchi, Glarus Alps, a mountain in the Glarus Alps, Switzerland
- Ruchi, Iran, a village in Razavi Khorasan, Iran
- Ruchi (magazine), a Gujarati-language magazine in India

== See also ==
- Ruçi, a common last name in Albania
- Ruci, a legendary place associated with Kakusandha Buddha
