= Haravanj =

Haravanj هراونج
- Village
- Location within Iran
- Coordinates: 34°19′16″N 58°24′32″E
- Country: Iran
- Province: Razavi Khorasan
- County: Gonabad
- Bakhsh: Kakhk
- Rural District: Zibad

Population (2006)
  - Total: 29
- Time zone: UTC+3:30 (IRST)
  - Summer (DST): UTC+4:30 (IRDT)

Haravanj (Persian: هراونج, also Romanized as Harāvanj; also known as Kalāteh-ye Harāvanj) is a village in Zibad Rural District, Kakhk District, Gonabad County, Razavi Khorasan Province, Iran. At the 2006 census, its population was 29, in 7 families.
