= Bihud =

Bihud or Beyhud (Persian: بيهود) may refer to:

- Beyhud, Razavi Khorasan
- Bihud, South Khorasan
