= Musaba =

Musaba is a surname. Notable people with the surname include:

- Anthony Musaba (born 2000), Dutch footballer
- Richie Musaba (born 2000), Dutch footballer, twin brother of Anthony

== See also ==
- "Parco-Museo Santa Barbara", known also as MUSABA, an open-air art museum created by Nik Spatari
