= Gonbatuk =

Gonbatuk گنبتوك
- Village
- Location within Iran
- Coordinates: 34°21′54″N 58°23′53″E
- Country: Iran
- Province: Razavi Khorasan
- County: Gonabad
- Bakhsh: Kakhk
- Rural District: Zibad

Population (2006)
  - Total: 26
- Time zone: UTC+3:30 (IRST)
  - Summer (DST): UTC+4:30 (IRDT)

Gonbatuk (Persian: گنبتوك, also Romanized as Gonbatūk; also known as Jozbatūk) is a village in Zibad Rural District, Kakhk District, Gonabad County, Razavi Khorasan Province, Iran. At the 2006 census, its population was 26, in 7 families.
