= Khatumeh =

Khatumeh خاتومه
- Village
- Location within Iran
- Coordinates: 34°15′57″N 58°25′54″E
- Country: Iran
- Province: Razavi Khorasan
- County: Gonabad
- Bakhsh: Kakhk
- Rural District: Zibad

Population (2006)
  - Total: 19
- Time zone: UTC+3:30 (IRST)
  - Summer (DST): UTC+4:30 (IRDT)

Khatumeh (Persian: خاتومه, also Romanized as Khātūmeh; also known as Kalāteh-ye Khātūmeh) is a village in Zibad Rural District, Kakhk District, Gonabad County, Razavi Khorasan Province, Iran. At the 2006 census, its population was 19, in 8 families.
