= Kalateh-ye Shahab =

Kalateh-ye Shahab كلاته شهاب
- Village
- Location within Iran
- Coordinates: 34°16′15″N 58°29′19″E
- Country: Iran
- Province: Razavi Khorasan
- County: Gonabad
- Bakhsh: Kakhk
- Rural District: Zibad

Population (2006)
  - Total: 43
- Time zone: UTC+3:30 (IRST)
  - Summer (DST): UTC+4:30 (IRDT)

Kalateh-ye Shahab (Persian: كلاته شهاب, also Romanized as Kalāteh-ye Shahāb; also known as Mazra‘eh-ye Shahāb and Dar Sūqeh) is a village in Zibad Rural District, Kakhk District, Gonabad County, Razavi Khorasan Province, Iran. At the 2006 census, its population was 43, in 14 families.
