= Musiraz =

Musiraz موسيرز
- Village
- Location within Iran
- Coordinates: 34°18′40″N 58°26′07″E
- Country: Iran
- Province: Razavi Khorasan
- County: Gonabad
- Bakhsh: Kakhk
- Rural District: Zibad

Population (2006)
  - Total: 217
- Time zone: UTC+3:30 (IRST)
  - Summer (DST): UTC+4:30 (IRDT)

Musiraz (Persian: موسيرز, also Romanized as Mūsīraz; also known as Mūsīr) is a village in Zibad Rural District, Kakhk District, Gonabad County, Razavi Khorasan Province, Iran. At the 2006 census, its population was 217, in 84 families.
