= Bice Lazzari =

Italian painter (1900–1981)

- Self-portrait, 1929
- Born: November 15, 1900; Venice, Italy
- Died: November 13, 1981 (aged 80); Rome, Italy
- Resting place: Quero, Italy
- Education: Benedetto Marcello Conservatory; lecturer at the Academy of Fine Arts
- Known for: Oil painting
- Spouse: Diego Rosa

Beatrice "Bice" Lazzari (15 November 1900 – 13 November 1981) was an Italian painter.

== Early life ==
Beatrice Lazzari was born in Venice to Lorenzo (Luciano) Lazzari and Francesca Rinaldo. She was the second of three sisters, the youngest of whom, Onorina (Nini), married architect Carlo Scarpa. Beatrice was educated in Venice, first at the Benedetto Marcello Conservatory and then at the Accademia di Belle Arti di Venezia, where she would later be invited back as a lecturer. Lazzari's first exhibition was a group show at the Bevilacqua La Masa Foundation in 1924. In 1928, she had her first solo exhibition at Galleria Botteghe D'Arte in Venice. In 1929, she had her second solo show at the Galleria San Moise. On both occasions, she mostly exhibited figurative paintings. In the early 1930s, Lazzari hung out at the Artistic Circle of Palazzo dei Piombi e dal Caffè on the banks of the Zattere, where she met Carlo Scarpa, Mario Deluigi and Virgilio Guidi and was inspired to steer her work towards a more rationalist approach. She made a clean break from figuration, and started working on abstract and geometric compositions.

== The Rome Years 1935-1981 ==
In 1935, Lazzari moved to Rome, where, on top of regularly exhibiting her paintings in gallery and museum shows, she started working on murals and decorative panels in collaboration with the architects Attilio and Ernesto Lapadula. In 1941, she married the Venetian architect Diego Rosa.

After World War Two, Lazzari focused exclusively on painting. In the 1950s, she was invited to participate in the 25th Venice Biennale and the Rome Quadrennial. From the late 1950s to 1963, she worked mostly with oil to reinforce the application of other materials such as glues, sands and later acrylics. In 1964, her work took a minimalist turn, her work often consisting of graphite-drawn lines on monochrome backgrounds. Lazzari died in Rome in 1981.

== Legacy ==
The Archive Bice Lazzari is based in Rome. It houses a significant number of her works, including paintings, poems and exhibition catalogues.

From May 10 to Sep 22, 2013, the National Museum of Women in the Arts exhibited Bice Lazzari: Signature Line, displaying paintings and drawings from the Archivio Bice Lazzari.

In 2018-2019, The Phillips Collection exhibited Bice Lazzari: The Poetry of Mark-Making, featuring works acquired by the Collection. The exhibition was curated by Renato Miracco.

Lazzari's work was included in the 2021 exhibition Women in Abstraction at the Centre Pompidou. In 2022 the Estorick Collection of Modern Italian Art in London held a retrospective of her work entitled Bice Lazzari: Modernist Pioneer.

In 2023 her work was included in the exhibition Action, Gesture, Paint: Women Artists and Global Abstraction 1940-1970 at the Whitechapel Gallery in London.

Lazzari's work is in the National Museum of Women in the Arts and The Phillips Collection in Washington, D.C.

== Bibliography ==
- Guido Montana, Bice Lazzari: The Value of Signs, Galleria Weber, Turin, 1980
- Paolo Fossati (ed.), Bice Lazzari: Works 1925-1981, Electa, Milan, 1984
- Paola Watts, Claudio Strinati (eds.), Bice Lazzari 1900-1981/Works 1921-1981, Multigrafica, Rome, 1987
- Sergio Cortesini, Bice Lazzari: L'arte come misura, Gangemi, Rome, 2002
- Flavia Scotton, Renato Miracco (eds.), Bice Lazzari: The Abstract Emotion, Mazzotta, Milan, 2005
- Nina Siegal. “Bice Lazzari’s Art Finds a Spotlight at Masterpiece,” The New York Times, 26 June 2019.
