= Sanu, Iran =

Village in Razavi Khorasan province, Iran

Sanu Persian: سنو
- Village
- Location within Iran
- Coordinates: 34°18′48″N 58°26′48″E
- Country: Iran
- Province: Razavi Khorasan
- County: Gonabad
- District: Kakhk
- Rural District: Zibad

Population (2016)
  - Total: 1,048
- Time zone: UTC+3:30 (IRST)

Sanu (Persian: سنو) (Note: Also romanized as Sanū) is a village in Zibad Rural District of Kakhk District in Gonabad County, Razavi Khorasan province, Iran.

== Demographics ==
=== Population ===
At the time of the 2006 National Census, the village's population was 922 in 316 households. The following census in 2011 counted 773 people in 311 households. The 2016 census measured the population of the village as 1,048 people in 399 households.
