= Ruçi =

Ruçi or Ruci is an Albanian surname, which may be a locational surname for a person from a village near Tirana named Ruç or Ruçi. The surname may refer to:

- Alessio Ruci (born 1996), Albanian football player
- Aristidh Ruci (1875–1950), Albanian politician
- Flamur Ruçi (born 2002), Albanian football player
- Gramoz Ruçi (born 1951), Albanian politician
- Petro Ruçi (1957–2009), Albanian football player
- Shkëlzen Ruçi (born 1992), Albanian football player
- Vasil Ruci (born 1958), Albanian football player and coach
