= ONE: Only the Brave =

Combat sport events in 2022

- The poster for ONE: Only the Brave
- Promotion: ONE Championship
- Date: January 28, 2022
- Venue: Singapore Indoor Stadium
- City: Kallang, Singapore

Event chronology
ONE: Heavy Hitters	ONE: Only the Brave	ONE: Bad Blood

ONE: Only the Brave was a Combat sport event produced by ONE Championship that took place on January 28, 2022, at the Singapore Indoor Stadium in Kallang, Singapore.

== Background ==
The main event was set to feature an interim Heavyweight title fight between the Russian Anatoly Malykhin and the Belarusian Kiril Grishenko was expected to take place at the event. However, the bout was moved to this event ONE: Bad Blood due to Malykhin tested positive for COVID-19 days before the event.

The event also featured the semi-finals for the ONE Kickboxing Featherweight Grand Prix.

Françesco Xhaja made his promotional debut against the veteran Rade Opacic.

A Lightweight bout between Zhang Lipeng and Ruslan Emilbek Uulu was scheduled for the event.

A featherweight bout between Kim Jae Woong and Tang Kai was expected to take place at this event. However, Kim withdraw before the event due to undisclosed medical issue and the bout was moved to this event ONE X.

== Results ==
Main Card (YouTube / ONE Super App)
Weight class				Method	Round	Time	Notes
Featherweight Kickboxing	Sitthichai Sitsongpeenong	def.	Davit Kiria	Decision (unanimous)	3	3:00	(Note: ONE Featherweight Kickboxing World Grand Prix Tournament Semi-final bout.)
Featherweight Kickboxing	Chingiz Allazov	def.	Jo Nattawut	KO (head kick and punches)	1	1:55	(Note: ONE Featherweight Kickboxing World Grand Prix Tournament Semi-final bout.)
Lightweight	Zhang Lipeng	def.	Ruslan Emilbek Uulu	KO (punches)	1	0:32
Heavyweight Kickboxing	Rade Opačić	def.	Françesko Xhaja	TKO (3 knockdown rules)	2	2:00
Welterweight	Hiroyuki Tetsuka	def.	Edson Marques	KO (punch)	3	1:05
Strawweight	Jarred Brooks	def.	Hiroba Minowa	Decision (unanimous)	3	5:00
Lead Card (YouTube / Facebook / ONE Super App)
Catchweight (157.9 lbs) Kickboxing	Ivan Kondratev	def.	Dovydas Rimkus	KO (punch)	3	0:35	(Note: Rimkus missed weight (157.9 lbs))
Catchweight (135.5 lbs)	Tatsumitsu Wada	def.	Wang Shuo	Decision (unanimous)	3	5:00	(Note: Originally announced as a Flyweight bout, after change to Catchweight (135.5 lbs) bout.)
Bantamweight	Purev Otgonjargal	def.	Micael de Jesus	Decision (unanimous)	3	5:00

== Bonus awards ==
The following fighters received $50,000 bonuses.

- Performance of the Night: Chingiz Allazov, Rade Opačić and Zhang Lipeng.

== See also ==
- 2022 in ONE Championship
- List of ONE Championship events
- List of current ONE fighters
