= Zirjan, Gonabad =

Zirjan زيرجان
- Village
- Location within Iran
- Coordinates: 34°12′52″N 58°26′09″E
- Country: Iran
- Province: Razavi Khorasan
- County: Gonabad
- Bakhsh: Kakhk
- Rural District: Zibad

Population (2006)
  - Total: 220
- Time zone: UTC+3:30 (IRST)
  - Summer (DST): UTC+4:30 (IRDT)

Zirjan (Persian: زيرجان, also Romanized as Zīrjān and Zīr Jān) is a village in Zibad Rural District, Kakhk District, Gonabad County, Razavi Khorasan Province, Iran. At the 2006 census, its population was 220, in 76 families.
