= Fudenjan =

Village in Razavi Khorasan province, Iran

Fudenjan Persian: فودنجان
- Village
- Location within Iran
- Coordinates: 34°23′19″N 58°22′40″E
- Country: Iran
- Province: Razavi Khorasan
- County: Gonabad
- District: Kakhk
- Rural District: Zibad

Population (2016)
  - Total: 273
- Time zone: UTC+3:30 (IRST)

Fudenjan (Persian: فودنجان) (Note: Also romanized as Fūdanjān and Fūdenjān; also known as Fooranjan, Fūtenjān, and Patān Jū) is a village in Zibad Rural District of Kakhk District in Gonabad County, Razavi Khorasan province, Iran.

== Demographics ==
=== Population ===
At the time of the 2006 National Census, the village's population was 263 in 87 households. The following census in 2011 counted 275 people in 88 households. The 2016 census measured the population of the village as 273 people in 96 households.
