= Kalat, Gonabad =

Village in Razavi Khorasan province, Iran

Kalat Persian: كلات
- Village
- Location within Iran
- Coordinates: 34°11′54″N 58°32′40″E
- Country: Iran
- Province: Razavi Khorasan
- County: Gonabad
- District: Kakhk
- Rural District: Zibad

Population (2016)
  - Total: 713
- Time zone: UTC+3:30 (IRST)

Kalat (Persian: كلات) (Note: Also romanized as Kalāt; also known as Kalūt) is a village in Zibad Rural District of Kakhk District in Gonabad County, Razavi Khorasan province, Iran.

== Demographics ==
=== Population ===
At the time of the 2006 National Census, the village's population was 754 in 288 households. The following census in 2011 counted 649 people in 280 households. The 2016 census measured the population of the village as 713 people in 296 households.
