= Françesko Xhaja =

Albanian kickboxer

- Born: August 9, 1993 (age 33); Albania
- Other names: Smile
- Nationality: Italian; Albanian
- Height: 194 cm (6 ft 4 in)
- Weight: 102 kg (225 lb; 16.1 st)
- Division: Heavyweight
- Reach: 196 cm (77 in)
- Style: Kickboxing
- Stance: Orthodox
- Fighting out of: Venice, Italy
- Team: SB Gym
- Years active: 2014–present

Kickboxing record
- Total: 29
- Wins: 21
- By knockout: 7
- Losses: 8
- By knockout: 6

Françesko Xhaja (born August 9, 1993) is an Albanian-Italian kickboxer, currently competing in the light heavyweight division of ONE Championship. As of February 2025, he is ranked as the tenth best heavyweight kickboxer in the world by Beyond Kickboxing.

== Professional kickboxing career ==
=== Early career ===
Xhaja faced Jan Beljajev at Number One Fight Show: Season 10 on September 22, 2018. He won the fight by unanimous decision. Xhaja next faced Mladen Kujundžić at Ultimate Fight Night on November 17, 2018. He won the fight by unanimous decision.

Xhaja challenged Guto Inocente for the WGP Kickboxing Super heavyweight (+94 kg) title at WGP Kickboxing #55 on June 15, 2019. He lost the fight by unanimous decision.

Xhaja faced Igor Darmeshkin in the quarterfinals of the 2019 Tatneft Cup heavyweight tournament, which took place on July 19, 2019. He won the fight by unanimous decision, after an extra round was contested. Xhaja was able to stop Mathieu Kongolo in the second round on October 4, 2019, which earned him a place in the tournament finals, which took place on December 15, 2019, opposite Petr Romankevich. He lost the fight by unanimous decision, after an extension round was fought.

Xhaja faced Strahinja Mitrić at Megdan 8: New Winners on December 18, 2020. He won the fight by split decision. Xhaja next faced Cyril Cereyon at Ultimate Fight Night on January 17, 2021. He won the fight by unanimous decision. Xhaja then faced Ahmed Krnjić at Senshi 9 on July 10, 2021. He won the fight by unanimous decision, after an extra round was contested.

=== ONE Championship ===
Xhaja faced Rade Opačić at ONE: Only the Brave on January 28, 2022, in his promotion debut with ONE Championship. He lost the fight by a second-round technical knockout.

Xhaja faced Andrei Stoica at ONE Fight Night 7 on February 24, 2023. He won the fight by split decision.

Xhaja was expected to challenge Roman Kryklia for the ONE Light Heavyweight Kickboxing World Championship at ONE Fight Night 12 on July 14, 2023. The fight was postponed on July 1, after Xhaja suffered an undisclosed injury.

Xhaja faced Massinissa Hamaili at SENSHI 24 on December 2, 2024. He won the fight by technical knockout 62 seconds into the opening round.

Xhaja faced Florin Ivănoaie at SENSHI 25 on February 22, 2025. He lost the fight by a first-round technical knockout.

Xhaja faced Marius Munteanu at SENSHI 26 - Gladiators on May 17, 2025. He won the fight by a first-round technical knockout.

== Championships and accomplishments ==
- Tatneft Cup
  - 2019 Tatneft Cup Heavyweight Tournament Runner-up
- Megdan Fighting
  - 2020 Megdan K-1 Heavyweight (+93 kg) Championship

== Fight record ==
Kickboxing record
21 Wins (7 (T)KO's), 8 Losses, 0 Draw
Date	Result	Opponent	Event	Location	Method	Round	Time
2026-12-05		(Suriname) Colin George	SENSHI 34 - Heavyweight Grand Prix, Quarterfinals	Varna, Bulgaria			
2026-07-11	Loss	(England) Nathan Cook	SENSHI 32	Varna, Bulgaria	TKO (3 Knockdowns)	1	
2026-02-28	Win	(Greece) Giannis Stoforidis	SENSHI 30	Varna, Bulgaria	Decision (Unanimous)	3	3:00
2025-09-13	Loss	(United Kingdom) Rhys Brudenell	SENSHI 28 - Grand Prix, Quarterfinals	Varna, Bulgaria	TKO (2 Knockdowns/low kicks)	2	
2025-07-12	Win	(France) Abdarhmane Coulibaly	SENSHI 27	Varna, Bulgaria	TKO (Corner stoppage/low kicks)	2	1:05
2025-05-17	Win	(Romania) Marius Munteanu	SENSHI 26 - Gladiators	Plovdiv, Bulgaria	TKO (3 knockdowns)	1	2:50
2025-02-22	Loss	(Romania) Florin Ivănoaie	SENSHI 25	Varna, Bulgaria	TKO (3 knockdowns/low kicks)	1	3:00
2024-12-07	Win	(Algeria) Massinissa Hamaili	SENSHI 24	Varna, Bulgaria	TKO (Corner stoppage/low kicks)	1	1:02
2023-02-24	Win	(Romania) Andrei Stoica	ONE Fight Night 7	Bangkok, Thailand	Decision (Split)	3	3:00
2022-01-28	Loss	(Serbia) Rade Opačić	ONE: Only the Brave	Kallang, Singapore	TKO (3 knockdown rule)	2	2:00
2021-07-10	Win	(Bosnia and Herzegovina) Ahmed Krnjić	SENSHI 9	Varna, Bulgaria	Ext. R. Decision (Unanimous)	4	3:00
2021-01-17	Win	(France) Cyril Cereyon	Ultimate Fight Night	Brest, France	Decision (Unanimous)	3	3:00
2020-12-18	Win	(Serbia) Strahinja Mitrić	Megdan 8: New Winners	Sremska Mitrovica, Serbia	Decision (Split)	3	3:00
Wins the Megdan K-1 Heavyweight (+93 kg) title.
2019-12-15	Loss	(Belarus) Petr Romankevich	Tatneft Cup, Tournament Final	Kazan, Russia	Ext. R. Decision (Unanimous)	4	3:00
For the Tatneft Cup Heavyweight (+90kg) Tournament title.
2019-10-04	Win	(Belgium) Mathieu Kongolo	Tatneft Cup, Tournament Semifinal	Kazan, Russia	TKO (Retirement)	2	1:28
2019-07-19	Win	(Russia) Igor Darmeshkin	Tatneft Cup, Tournament Quarterfinal	Kazan, Russia	Ext. R. Decision (Unanimous)	4	3:00
2019-06-15	Loss	(Brazil) Guto Inocente	WGP Kickboxing #55	Brasilia, Brazil	Decision (Unanimous)	5	3:00
For the WGP Kickboxing Super heavyweight (+94kg) title.
2019-04-26	Win	(China) Liu Wei	Tatneft Cup, Tournament Round of 16	Kazan, Russia	KO (Head kick)	1	0:05
2019-03-16	Win	(France) Pascal Touré	Power Trophy	Orange, France	TKO	2	
2018-11-17	Win	(Croatia) Mladen Kujundžić	Ultimate Fight Night	Koper, Slovenia	Decision (Unanimous)	3	3:00
2018-09-22	Win	(Estonia) Jan Beljajev	Number One Fight Show: Season 10	Tallinn, Estonia	Decision (Unanimous)	3	3:00
2018-05-11	Win	(France) Karim Zeghad	Ultimate Fight Night	Le Beausset, France	Decision (Unanimous)	3	3:00
2018-03-17	Win	(Morocco) Hassen Otman	Power Trophy 2018	Orange, France	Decision (Unanimous)	3	3:00
2017-11-11	Loss	(Czech Republic) David Vinš	Night of Warriors 12	Liberec, Czech Republic	KO (Left straight)	3	1:43
2017-01-14	Win	(Italy) Alessandro Lamonica	The Night of Kick and Punch 6	Milan, Italy	Decision (Unanimous)	3	3:00
2016-04-16	Win	(Italy) Danilo Coda	Sacile in Fight	Italy	TKO (Retirement)		
2015-03-28	Loss	(Moldova) Pavel Voronin	Kombat League, Tournament Semifinal	Verona, Italy	KO (Left hook)	1	
2014-06-17	Win	(Italy) Nico Zerbin		Spinea, Italy	TKO	2	
Legend: Win Loss Draw/No contest Notes

== See also ==
- List of male kickboxers
- List of Italians of Albanian descent
