= Saqi, Razavi Khorasan =

Village in Razavi Khorasan province, Iran

Saqi Persian: سقي
- Village
- Location within Iran
- Coordinates: 34°13′23″N 58°31′34″E
- Country: Iran
- Province: Razavi Khorasan
- County: Gonabad
- District: Kakhk
- Rural District: Zibad

Population (2016)
  - Total: 269
- Time zone: UTC+3:30 (IRST)

Saqi (Persian: سقي) (Note: Also romanized as Saqī) is a village in Zibad Rural District of Kakhk District in Gonabad County, Razavi Khorasan province, Iran.

== Demographics ==
=== Population ===
At the time of the 2006 National Census, the village's population was 287 in 134 households. The following census in 2011 counted 298 people in 140 households. The 2016 census measured the population of the village as 269 people in 121 households.
