= Francesco Altimari =

Italian scholar

Francesco Altimari (Albanian: Françesko Altimari) is an Italian scholar in the field of Albanology. He is honorary member of the Academy of Sciences of Albania (2006), external member of the Academy of Sciences and Arts of Kosovo (2008) and full professor (1991) of the Albanology section of the University of Calabria.

== Early life ==
Altimari was born on 21 February 1955 in San Demetrio Corone in Calabria, Italy and is of Arbëreshë descent. After finishing the lyceum in his hometown in 1973, he graduated from the Faculty of Literature and Philosophy of the University of Calabria in 1978.

== Academic life ==
Altimari worked as a teacher of the Albanian language (1980–1986). From 1991 is full professor in Albanology in the University of Calabria; he started his academical career in the field of Albanian language, literature, and philology, and Balkanic philology and linguistics, first associated with the Faculty of Literature and Philosophy of the University of Calabria, and followed later by University of Mannheim and LMU Munich via German Academic Exchange Service (DAAD), Università degli Studi di Napoli "L'Orientale", "Cattolica" of Milan, as well as universities in Lecce, Trieste, Tirana, Shkodër, and Gjirokastër. As of 2012, he is part of the editorial staff of albanological periodicals as Studia Albanica of Tirana and is scientific director of "Res Albanicae" of university Foundation "Francesco Solano" of the University of Calabria.

Altimari is also member of the AISEE (Associazione Italiana di Studi del Sud Est Europeo) since 1992, and member of Sodalizio Glottologico Milanese since 1999.

== Publications ==
=== Books and monographs ===
- Altimari F, Canti di Milosao. Edizione critica delle tre versioni a stampa (1836, 1847, 1873) e della IV versione manoscritta (1896)/a cura di Francesco Altimari-

Songs of Milosao. Critical edition of the three printed versions (1836, 1847, 1873) and of the fourth manuscript version (1896) by Francesco Altimari, Opera Omnia di Girolamo De Rada, vol. II, Soveria Mannelli: Rubbettino Editore, 2017.

- Altimari F. et alii (a cura di), PER UNA NUOVA DIDATTICA DELL'ALBANESE: PROVE DI E-LEARNING E DI LUDOLINGUISTICA. Albanistica vol. 7, Fondazione Universitaria “Francesco Solano”, Rende 2016 (con CD allegato).
- Altimari F., URAT E ARBËRIT. Studime filologjike dhe kritiko-letrare midis botës arbëreshe dhe botës shqiptare, “Naimi”, Tirana 2015.
- Altimari F., Jeronim De Rada, VEPRA LETRARE, I, Këngët para Millosaut. I canti premilosaici (1833-1835) Sprovat e para poetike të Jeronim De Radës. Botim kritik e përkthime italisht përgatitur nga Francesco Altimari. vol. I, p. 7-347, Ministria e Kultures e Republikës së Shqipërisë, Tirana 2014.
- Altimari F., Jeronim De Rada, VEPRA LETRARE, II, Këngët e Millosaut - I Canti di Milosao Botim kritik i tri varianteve (1836, 1847, 1873) përgatitur nga Francesco Altimari. vol. II, p. 5-332, Ministria e Kultures e Republikës së Shqipërisë, Tirana 2014.
- Altimari F., Studia linguistica italo-albanica. Arbërishtja në kontekstin gjuhësor ballkanik dhe italian. vol. 51, p. 1-248, Akademia e Shkencave dhe e Arteve e Kosovës/Kosova Academy of Sciences and Arts, Prishtina 2014.
- Altimari F., Berisha A., De Rosa F., Belmonte V., Antologia della letteratura degli Albanesi di Calabria (Anthology of the Calabrese Albanians literature), Albanologia Vol. 8, Università della Calabria Dipartimento di Linguistica Sezione di Albanologia. Cosenza, 2009.
- Altimari F., I Canti Premilosaici (1833-1835). Le prime raccolte poetiche in albanese di Girolamo De Rada. Edizione critica e traduzione italiana a cura di Francesco Altimari (The Pre-Milosaic Songs [1833-1835]. The first poetic stories of Girolamo de Rada. Critical edition and Italian translation by Francesco Altimari), Opera Omnia di Girolamo De Rada Vol. I, Soveria Mannelli: Rubbettino Editore, 2005.
- Altimari F., Vëzhgime gjuhësore dhe letrare arbëreshe (Arbereshe linguistic and literary observations), Prishtina: Shpresa & Faik Konica, 2002.
- Altimari F., Girolamo De Rada, I Canti Premilosaici. Edizione critica e traduzione italiana (Girolamo De Rada, Pre-Milosaic Songs. Critic edition and Italian translation.), Classici della letteratura arbëreshe, Rubbettino, 1998.
- Altimari F., Scripta minora albanica (Minor Albanian script), Quaderni di Zjarri Vol. 19, San Demetrio Corone: ZJARRI, 1994.
- Altimari F., Studi linguistici arbëreshë (Arbereshe linguistic studies), Quaderni di Zjarri Vol. 12, San Demetrio Corone: ZJARRI, 1988.
- Altimari F., Studi sulla letteratura albanese della "Rilindja" (Studies on the Albanian literature of the "Rilindja"), Quaderni di Zjarri Vol. 11, San Demetrio Corone: ZJARRI, 1984.
- Altimari F., Un saggio inedito di Francesco Antonio Santori sulla lingua albanese e i suoi alfabeti(An unpublished essay of Francesco Antonio Santori on the Albanian language and its alphabets), Quaderni di Zjarri Vol. 7, San Demetrio Corone: ZJARRI, 1982.

=== As editor or co-author ===
- Altimari F., Conforti E., Omaggio a Girolamo de Rada. Atti del V Seminario Internazionale di Studi Italo-Albanesi (2-5 ottobre 2003) e altri contributi albanologici (Homage to Girolamo de Rada. Acts of the 5th international Seminary of Italo-Albanian studies), Albanologia Vol. 7, Università della Calabria Dipartimento di Linguistica Sezione di Albanologia. Cosenza, 2008.
- Altimari F., Girolamo De Rada, I Canti Premilosaici (1833-1835) (Pre-Milosaic Songs), Classici della letteratura arbëreshe - Opera Omnia di Girolamo de Rada Vol. I, Rubbettino, 2005.
- Altimari F., De Rosa F., Atti del 3° Seminario Internazionale di Studi Albanesi (Acts of the 3rd Seminary of the Albanian Studies), Albanistica Vol. 13, Università della Calabria: Centro Editoriale e Librario, 2004.
- Altimari F., Berisha A., Jeronim De Rada, Poezi shqipe të shekullit XV. Këngët e Millosaut, Bir i Sundimtarit të Shkodrës. Transkriptimin Françesko Altimari- Parathënien Anton Nikë Berisha (Albanian poetry of the 15th century. Songs of Milosao, Heir of the Lord of Shkodra. Transcription from Francesco Altimari - Preface by Anton Nikë Berisha), Shpresa, 2001.
- Altimari F., Berisha A., Belmonte V., Antologia della poesia orale arbëreshe- Antologjia e poezisë gojore arbëreshe (Anthology of the oral Arbereshe poetry), Quaderni di Zjarri, Rubbettino, 1998.
- Altimari F., Naim Frashëri, Bagëti'e Bujqësija (I pascoli e i campi). Introduzione, edizione critica, traduzione italiana e concordanza (Cattle-breeding and Agriculture. Introduction, critical edition, Italian language translation and adjustment), Albanistica Vol. 4, Università della Calabria, Centro Editoriale e Librario, 1995.
- Altimari F., De Rosa F., Testi folclorici di Falconara Albanese pubblicati nella rivista "La Calabria" (1888-1902). Trascrizione dall'originale e concordanza integrale per forme e lemmi" (Folkloric tests of Falconara Albanese published in the magazine "La Calabria" [1888-1902]), DIADIA, 1995.
- Altimari F., Savoia L. M., I dialetti italo-albanesi. Studi linguistici e storico-culturali sulle comunità arbëreshe (The Italo-Albanian dialects. Linguistic and historical-cultural studies on the Arbereshe community), Biblioteca di Cultura Vol. 488, Roma: Bulzoni, 1994.
- Altimari F., Berisha A., Kandili argjandit-Dramë. Përgatitur për shtyp nga Françesko Altimari dhe Anton Berisha (Silver oil-lamp - Drama. Prepared for press by Francesco Altimari and Anton Berisha), Radhonjtë e Zjarrit Vol. 17, San Demetrio Corone: ZJARRI, 1993.
- Altimari F., Quaderni del Dipartimento di Linguistica-Serie Albanistica-I-Studi albanesi in onore di Francesco Solano (Notebooks of the Linguistics Department - Albanological Series - Albanian studies in honor of Francesco Solano), Albanistica Vol. I, UNICAL - Dipartimento di Linguistica, 1993.

=== Other ===
- Kostandini ose enigma kadareane e të vdekurit që kthehet mes të gjallëve (Konstantine of the Kadare-an enigma of the living dead). In Ismail Kadare, VEPRA, vol. X. Tirana: Onufri, 2008, pp. 159–166.
- Omaggio a De Rada_Pacchetto con 3 DVD multimediali per il centenario della morte del poeta (Homage to De Rada with 3 multimedia DVDs on the poets death), 2005.

== See also ==
- Maria Antonia Braile
- Pasquale Scutari
