= Fabio Sakaj =

Italian-born Albanian footballer

Personal information
- Date of birth: 2 February 1998 (age 28)
- Place of birth: Alatri, Frosinone, Italy
- Height: 1.81 m (5 ft 11 in)
- Position: Midfielder

Team information
- Current team: ASD Atletic Cdr Mutina

Youth career
- Virtus Pavullese
- –2016: Modena

Senior career*
Years	Team	Apps	(Gls)
2014–2017	Modena	11	(0)
2017–2018	Racing Fondi	4	(0)
2018–2019	Pianese	17	(0)
2019–2020	Vis Artena	24	(0)
2021	Sestri Levante	11	(0)
2022	Cattolica	13	(0)
2023	Bagnolese	5	(0)
2023–2024	SCD Progresso Calcio	8	(0)
2024	Terre di Castelli		
2024–2025	ASD K-Sport Montecchio		
2025–	ASD Atletic Cdr Mutina		

International career
2016	Albania U19	1	(0)
- * Club domestic league appearances and goals as of 28 September 2026

Fabio Sakaj (born 2 February 1998) is an Italian-born Albanian professional footballer who plays as a midfielder for ASD Atletic Cdr Mutina.

== Early life and youth career ==
Sakaj was born in Alatri, a comune of province of Frosinone in the Italian region of the Lazio, to Albanian parents originally from Lezhë, Albania. He started his football at the Virtus Pavullese, a small football team in the town of Pavullo Nel Frignano, in the Italian province of Modena. He moved at Modena academy and in 2014 became part of the Primavera team under coach Simone Barone.

== Club career ==
=== Modena ===
Sakaj gained entry with the first team of Modena F.C. as he was included in the team by the coach Simone Pavan to participate in the match against Brescia on 3 March 2015. Then he continued to participate regularly in 6 another matches, until he managed to make its debut against Virtus Entella on 11 April 2015 by coming on as a substitute in the stoppage time 90'+2 minute in place of Pablo Granoche.

On 5 November 2017, Modena declared bankrupt after failing to pay player wages or stadium bills which brought about a player strike and a stadium lockout. The club had not attended the previous three Serie C matches, including not attending the match against Santarcangelo Calcio; with a total of four matches not attended, the club were officially excluded from "Lega Pro" on 6 November.

=== Fondi ===
On 11 December 2017, he signed with Racing Fondi as a free agent.

== International career ==
Sakaj received his first call up to the Albania national under-19 team by coach Arjan Bellaj for the friendly tournament Roma Caput Mundi from 29 February–4 March 2016.

Sakaj received his first call up at Albania national under-21 football team by coach Alban Bushi for a gathering in Durrës, Albania from 18 to 25 January 2017.

He received his first call up for the Albania under-20 side by coach Alban Bushi for the double friendly match against Azerbaijan U-21 on 21 & 26 January 2018.

== Career statistics ==
=== Club ===
As of 17 December 2017

Club statistics
Club	Season	League			Cup		Europe (Note: Including continental competitions, such as UEFA Champions League and UEFA Europa League)		Other		Total	
Club	Season	Division	Apps	Goals	Apps	Goals	Apps	Goals	Apps	Goals	Apps	Goals
Modena	2014–15	Serie B	4	0	—		—		2	0	6	0
Modena	2015–16	Serie B	4	0	1	0	—		—		5	0
Modena	2016–17	Serie C	1	0	1	0	—		—		2	0
Modena	2017–18	Serie C	—		—		—		—		0	0
Modena	Total		9	0	2	0	—		2	0	13	0
Racing Fondi	2017–18	Serie C	0	0	—		—		—		0	0
Career total			9	0	2	0	—		2	0	13	0
