= Zirjan, Nishapur =

Zirjan زيرجان
- Village
- Location within Iran
- Coordinates: 36°05′49″N 58°48′54″E
- Country: Iran
- Province: Razavi Khorasan
- County: Nishapur
- Bakhsh: Central
- Rural District: Darbqazi

Population (2006)
  - Total: 68
- Time zone: UTC+3:30 (IRST)
  - Summer (DST): UTC+4:30 (IRDT)

Zirjan (Persian: زيرجان, also Romanized as Zīrjān; also known as Zarjān) is a village in Darbqazi Rural District, in the Central District of Nishapur County, Razavi Khorasan Province, Iran. At the 2006 census, its population was 68, in 19 families.
