= Pasquale Scutari =

Pasquale Scutari is an Italian linguist and Albanologist.

Scutari was born in the Arbereshe San Costantino Albanese in the Province of Potenza, southern Italy in 1952. He graduated from the "Istituto Magistrale di Lagonegro" and later he enrolled in the Faculty of Philology of the University of Bari in 1976.

As a very fond of Arbereshe language person, he has participated in many convents and seminars, between others "La diversità linguistica, patrimonio culturale della Basilicata" (The linguistic diversity, cultural patrimony of Basilicata), held in San Costantino Albanese in 2004.

He received a docent title from the University of Basilicata in 2003 with the title "Operatore linguistico e culturale di area arbëreshe" (Linguistic and cultural operator in the Arbereshe area). Scutari is a collaborator of the periodical Bashkia (The municipality), cultural section, issued by the Municipality of S.Constantino Albanese.

Scutari is the author of many studies and monographs on the Albanian dialects of Italy.

== Works ==
- Gli Arbëreshë e la «Rilindja». Il contributo al Risorgimento degli intellettuali di San Costantino Albanese (The Arbëresh and "Rilindja". The contribution to the unification of Albanian intellectuals of San Costantino Albanese), Consenza: Università della Calabria, Dipartimento di Linguistica, Sezione di Albanologia, 2010. ISBN 9788896513057.
- Dizionario arbëresh di San Costantino Albanese (Arberesh dictionary of San Costantino Albanese), Rende, 2010. OCLC 867173600.
- Spigolature lessicali sulla parlata degli Arbëreshë di San Costantino Albanese (Lexical gleanings of the Arbëreshë spoken in San Costantino Albanese), S.l.: s.n.: 1991. OCLC 883711451.
- Il lessico della parlata arbëreshe di San Costantino Albanese (The vocabulary of the Arbereshe spoken in San Costantino Albanese), Rende: 2002, series: Studi e testi di albanistica, 11, ISBN 9788886067904.
- I nomi delle piante nella comunità albanese del Pollino Lucano (The names of the plants in the Albanian community of Pollino Lucano), Rende (CS): CELUC, 2005, series: Studi e testi di albanistica, 15. ISBN 9788874580354.
- Uno studio fonologico morfologico sulla parlata arbereshe di San Costantino Albanese (A study on the phonological morphological Arbereshe spoken in San Costantino Albanese), Cosenza: Benvenuto, 1997. OCLC 157053016.

== See also ==
- Francesco Altimari
