= Irlian Ceka =

Albanian footballer

Personal information
- Date of birth: 3 March 1998 (age 28)
- Place of birth: Rome, Italy
- Height: 1.78 m (5 ft 10 in)
- Position: Left back

Youth career
- 2008–2015: Roma
- 2015–2016: Ascoli
- 2016–2017: Lazio

Senior career*
Years	Team	Apps	(Gls)
2017–2018	Sambenedettese	4	(0)
2019–2020	Laçi	1	(0)
2019–2020	→ Apolonia (loan)	5	(0)
2020–2021	Atletico Lodigiani		
2021–2023	Aprilia	60	(1)
2023–2024	Audace		
2024–2025	SSD Certosa		

International career
2017	Albania U20	1	(0)
2017–2018	Albania U21	9	(0)
- * Club domestic league appearances and goals as of 28 September 2026

Irlian Ceka (born 3 March 1998) is an Albanian professional footballer who plays as a left back.

== Club career ==
=== Sambenedettese ===
On 13 July 2017 he was bought by Serie C team Sambenedettese.

=== KF Laçi ===
Ceka joined KF Laçi in January 2019, after signing a 2,5-year contract with the club.

== International career ==
Ceka received his first international call up from the Albania national under-21 team by coach Alban Bushi for the Friendly match against France U21 on 5 June 2017 and the 2019 UEFA European Under-21 Championship qualification opening match against Estonia U21 on 12 June 2017. He made his competitive debut for Albania U21 against Estonia U21 on 12 June 2017 under coach Alban Bushi playing the full 90-minutes match to help his side to take a goalless draw. He received his first call up for the Albania under-20 side by same coach of the under-21 team Alban Bushi for the friendly match against Georgia on 14 November 2017. He debuted for under-20 team against Georgia by playing as a starter until 55th minute when he was substituted off for Marco Hoxha with score at 1–0 and the entire match finished in an eventual 3–0 loss.

== Career statistics ==
=== Club ===
As of 29 December 2017

Club statistics
Club	Season	League			Cup		Europe (Note: Including continental competitions, such as UEFA Champions League and UEFA Europa League)		Other		Total	
Club	Season	Division	Apps	Goals	Apps	Goals	Apps	Goals	Apps	Goals	Apps	Goals
Sambenedettese	2017–18	Serie C	4	0	0	0	—		—		4	0
Career total			4	0	0	0	—		—		4	0
