= Ruchi, Iran =

Village in Razavi Khorasan province, Iran

Ruchi Persian: روچي
- Village
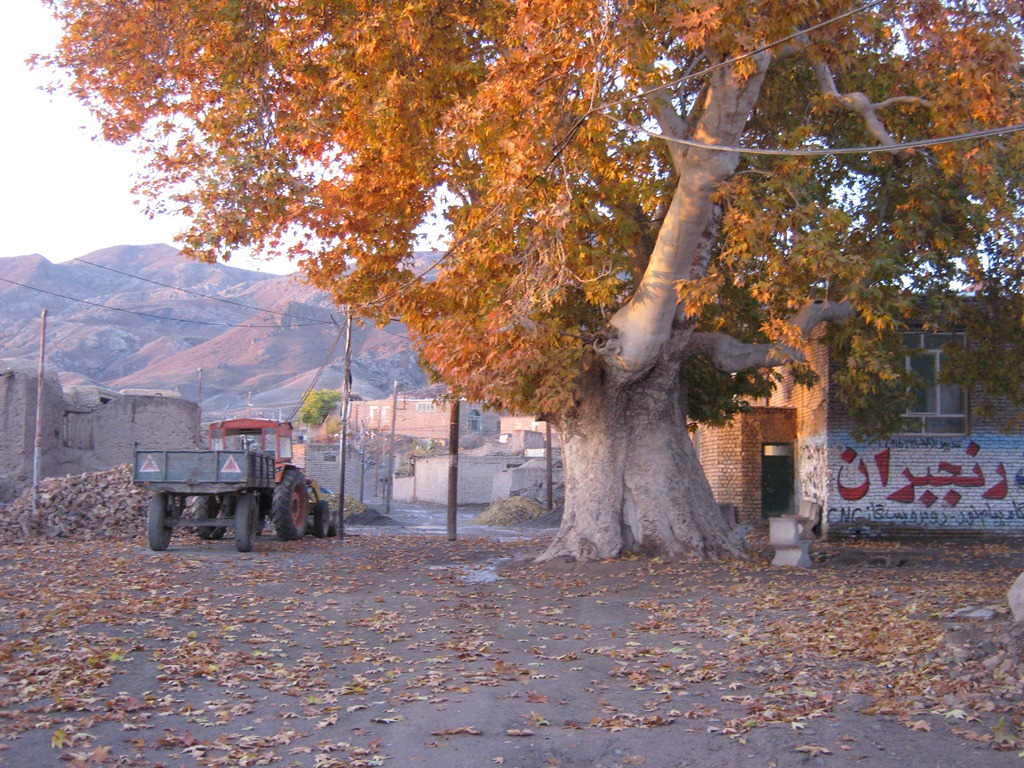
- The plane tree of Ruchi village, which is about 1,000 years old, has a diameter of three meters and a circumference of nine meters

- Location within Iran
- Coordinates: 34°15′07″N 58°30′16″E
- Country: Iran
- Province: Razavi Khorasan
- County: Gonabad
- District: Kakhk
- Rural District: Zibad

Population (2016)
  - Total: 227
- Time zone: UTC+3:30 (IRST)

Ruchi (Persian: روچي) (Note: Also romanized as Rūchī; also known as Ruchīn) is a village in Zibad Rural District of Kakhk District in Gonabad County, Razavi Khorasan province, Iran.

== Demographics ==
=== Population ===
At the time of the 2006 National Census, the village's population was 364 in 143 households. The following census in 2011 counted 287 people in 126 households. The 2016 census measured the population of the village as 227 people in 110 households.
