= Beyhud, Razavi Khorasan =

Village in Razavi Khorasan province, Iran

Beyhud Persian: بيهود
- Village
- Location within Iran
- Coordinates: 34°20′35″N 58°22′07″E
- Country: Iran
- Province: Razavi Khorasan
- County: Gonabad
- District: Kakhk
- Rural District: Zibad

Population (2016)
  - Total: 240
- Time zone: UTC+3:30 (IRST)

Beyhud (Persian: بيهود) (Note: Also romanized as Beyhūd; also known as Beyhūt) is a village in Zibad Rural District of Kakhk District in Gonabad County, Razavi Khorasan province, Iran.

== Demographics ==
=== Population ===
At the time of the 2006 National Census, the village's population was 205 in 65 households. The following census in 2011 counted 179 people in 62 households. The 2016 census measured the population of the village as 240 people in 80 households.
