= Kleto Gjura =

Albanian footballer, defender

Personal information
- Date of birth: 1 January 1999 (age 27)
- Place of birth: Shkodër, Albania
- Height: 1.81 m (5 ft 11 in)
- Position: Defender

Team information
- Current team: Asti

Youth career
- Alessandria

Senior career*
Years	Team	Apps	(Gls)
2018–2020	Alessandria	20	(2)
2021–2022	Derthona	48	(1)
2022–2023	Pinerolo	24	(1)
2023–	Asti	17	(0)

International career^{‡}
2017	Albania U19	3	(0)
- * Club domestic league appearances and goals as of 20 December 2023 ‡ National team caps and goals as of 10 October 2017

Kleto Gjura (born 30 November 1998) is an Albanian footballer who plays as a defender for Italian Serie D club Asti. He also holds Italian citizenship.

== Club career ==
Gjura made his professional debut in the 2017–18 season of Serie C, on 28 April 2018 against Pistoiese. He came in as a substitute for Dragan Lovrić in the 74th minute. He scored the only goal of Alessandria ten minutes later, but his team lost the match 2–1.

== International career ==
Gjura made his debut in the Albania national under-19 football team on 4 October 2017, in a 2017 UEFA European Under-19 Championship qualification match against Ukraine, playing 90 minutes.
