= Renato Miracco =

Italian art curator

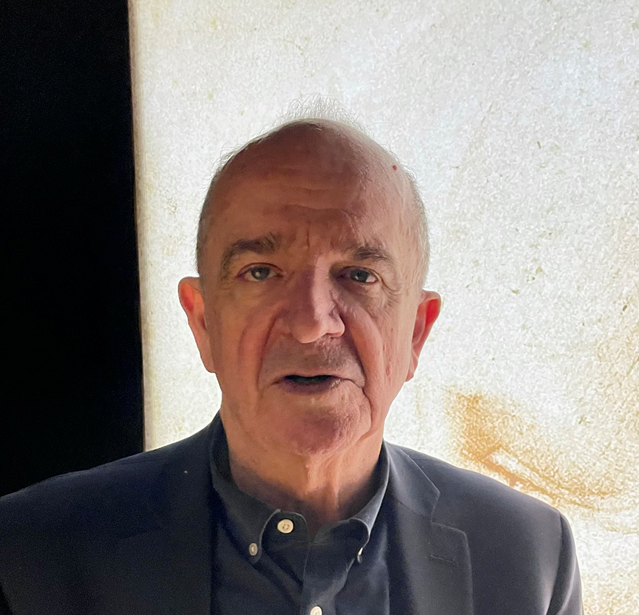
Renato Miracco in 2024

Renato Miracco in born in Naples (Italy) October the 15th, 1953 and is a scholar, art critic, and curator from Naples, Italy. He was born into a family of Arbereshe people, and he is the great-grandson of the Garibaldinian soldier Demetrio Baffa and a cousin of the Italian writer and former fashion editor Demetrio Baffa Trasci Amalfitani. He previously served as the Cultural Attaché of the Italian Embassy in Washington, and he is a former member of the Board of Guarantors for the Italian Academy at Columbia University. Miracco has curated numerous important exhibitions on Italian art worldwide and has published widely. From 2019 to 2024 he is serving as Guest Curator at the Phillips Collection in Washington DC, the first American Museum dedicated to modern and contemporary art. Currently, Miracco serves on the Board of IA&A (International Art & Artists Foundation) in Washington DC. Miracco was awarded the Order of Merit of the Italian Republic for Cultural Achievements in 2018. Now an American citizen, Miracco continues his prolific work in curation, art criticism, and cultural diplomacy endeavors.

== Career highlights ==
During his tenure as the Cultural Attaché of the Italian Embassy from 2009 to 2017, Miracco made significant contributions to cultural exchange and diplomacy through the arts, bridging Italy and the United States. In 2013, he organized a series of more than 300 events to celebrate and explore the impact of Italian culture in the United States. As Attaché, Miracco supervised all of the Italian Embassy's exhibitions, organized the Italy@150 program in partnership with over 80 museums across the United States, and helped organize a Memorandum of Understanding (MOU) on Archaeology between the governments of Italy and the United States.

Miracco's influential prior positions include serving as Director of Chiara Fama for Cultural Affairs for the Italian Cultural Institute in New York (2007-2009), acting as an Advisor to the Ministry of Foreign Affairs of Italy, and organizing an exhibition at the Quirinale Palace in Rome for the President of Italy.

Miracco has lectured at Pratt Institute and other universities and institutions across the globe and has curated exhibitions at prestigious museums and collections, including the Metropolitan Museum of Art, The Phillips Collection, the National Gallery of Art, the Morgan Library and Museum, the Estorick Collection, and the Tate Modern.

Miracco's notable curated exhibitions include "An Italian Impressionist in Paris: Guiseppe de Nittis" at the Phillips Collection, which was declared among the 10 best exhibitions in 2023 by the Washington Post. Since 2018, he has been the Curator of the Pinacoteca De Nittis in Barletta, Italy. Additionally, Miracco is the Curator and Editor of the Catalogue SOLMI Ship of Fools, Venice Biennale 2024, Palazzo Dona dalle Rose from April 18 to July 2024.

Miracco is a prolific author and critic known for publishing numerous exhibition catalogues and art books that highlight Italian and American art, Impressionism, and cultural heritage. His recent notable publication, Giuseppe De Nittis: La Donazione di Léontine Gruvelle De Nittis (2023), in both Italian and English, revisits De Nittis's connections with French artists like Manet, Degas, and Caillebotte, emphasizing his unique contributions to Impressionism and his innovative visual systems that closely intertwine images and narrative.

== Exhibitions ==
Selected exhibition history
Exhibition	Institution or Location	Year(s)	Role
Bice Lazzari. I linguaggi del suo tempo	GNAMC - Galleria Nazionale d'Arte Moderna e Contemporanea, Roma, Italy	2026	Curator
SOLMI Ship of Fools	Venice Biennale 2024	2024	Curator
Henri de Toulouse Lautrec, L’altra realta’ nella Parigi di Fine Ottocento	Palazzo Della Marra, Barletta, Italy	2024	Curator
De Nittis, La Strada da Napoli a Brindisi	Editrice Rotas, Barletta, Italy	2023	Curator
An Italian Impressionist in Paris: Giuseppe De Nittis	The Phillips Collection, Washington, D.C.	2022-2023	Curator
Bice Lazzari Modernist Pioneer	The Estorick Collection, London, UK	2022	Curator
Bice Lazzari: The Poetry of Mark-Making	The Phillips Collection, Washington, D.C.	2018-2019	Curator
Rereading De Nittis, Today	Pinacoteca De Nittis Palazzo della Marra, Barletta, Italy	2018	Curator
Saving Art, Preserving Heritage	Embassy of Italy in Washington, D.C.	2018	Curator
War &Art WWI-USA in Italy Destruction and Protection of Italian Cultural Heritage During World War I	Secretary of Defense, Pentagon, Virginia	2017-2019	Curator
Massimiliano Gatti: The Day Memory Dissolved	The Italian Academy at Columbia University, New York	2016	Curator
Afro-Cuba: Mystery and Magic of Afro-Cuban Spirituality	The OAS AMA | Art Museum of the Americas, Washington, D.C.	2016	Curator
Le Onde: Waves of Italian Influence (1914–1971)	Hirshhorn Museum and Sculpture Garden, Washington, D.C.	2015-2016	Curator & Gallery Talk
Gemme dell'impressionismo: dipinti della National Gallery of art di Washington	Ara Pacis, Rome, Italy	2014	Co-curator
Next Stop: Italy	The Phillips Collection, Washington, D.C.	2013	Curator
Italian Paper Exhibition	Italian Embassy in Washington, D.C.	2013	Curator
Giorgio de Chirico: Myth and Archaeology	The Phillips Collection, Washington, D.C.	2013	Curator
Paolo Ventura: Selected Works	The Italian Academy at Columbia University, New York	2013	Curator
Costantino Nivola	Italian Embassy in Washington, D.C.	2012	Curator
Paintings from the Academia Carrara	Italian Embassy in Washington, D.C.	2011-12	Curator
Spirit Into Shape: Contemporary Italian Sculpture	Meridian International Center, Washington, D.C.	2011	Curator
Giorgio Morandi, 1890-1964	Museum of Modern Art of Bologna, Bologna, Italy	2009	Curator
Giorgio Morandi, 1890-1964	The Metropolitan Museum of Art, New York	2008	Curator
Renato D’Agostin: Metropolis	Leica Gallery, New York	2008	Curator
I lavoratori in cammino: da Pelizza da Volpedo a Ceroli	Italian Chamber of Deputies, Rome, Italy	2007-2008	Curator
The Artworks collected by Arturo Toscanini	New York Philharmonic Lincoln Center, New York	2007	Curator
Piety and Pragmatism: Spiritualism in Futurist Art	The Estorick Collection, London, UK	2007	Curator
Female Italian and Russian Avant-Garde Art, 1910-1935	Tretyakov Gallery, Moscow, Russia	2007	Curator
Mirko Dalla Mitologia all’Archetipo 1937- 1957	New York University, New York	2007	Curator
Lucio Fontana At the roots of Spatialism	New York University, New York; Italian Cultural Institute, LA	2006	Curator
Giulio Aristide Sartorio 1860-1932	Chiostro del Bramante, Rome, Italy	2006	Curator
Il Fregio di Giulio Aristide Sartorio	Palazzo Montecitorio, Rome, Italy	2006	Curator
Beyond Painting: Burri, Fontana, Manzoni	Tate Modern, London, UK	2005-2006	Curator
Bice Lazzari: Abstract Emotion (L'emozione Astratta)	Biennale Ca Pesaro, Fondazione Musei Civici di Venezia, Venice, Italy	2005	Curator
Futurist Skies: Italian Aeropainting	The Estorick Collection, London, UK	2005	Curator
Italian Still Life, 1910-1960	Argentina, Chile, Uruguay, Brazil, and Peru	2005	Curator
Federico Zandomeneghi: Impressionista Veneziano	Chiostro del Bramante, Rome, Italy	2005	Curator
Sironi Monumentale Cartoni e studi 1931-1940	MART Rovereto	2005-2024	Curator
De Nittis: Impressionista Italiano	Chiostro del Bramante, Rome; Fondazione Mazzotta, Milan, Italy	2004	Curator
I Tesori del Mare	Museo Fattori, Livorno, Italy	2004	Co-curator
Il Respiro dell Anima, Giorgio Morandi e la Natura Morta in Italia	Europalia Bruges Groeningemuseum, Arentshuis, Bruges, Belgium	2003-2004	Curator
Futurismo 1909-1926	Museum of Ixelles, Ixelles, Belgium	2003-2004	Curator
Aerea cielos futuristas	Museo Municipal de Arte Contemporaneo, Madrid, Spain	2003	Curator
Italian Art 1950-1970: Capolavori della Collezione Farnesina	India Museum Contemporary Art, New Delhi	2003	Curator
Giulio Aristide Sartorio Impressioni di Guerra 1917-1918	Palazzo Montecitorio, Deputy Chambers, Rome, Italy	2002	Curator
Light and Painting in Italy 1850-1914	Fondazione Adriano Olivetti, Ivrea, Italy; Estorick Collection, London, UK; Museum of Modern Art Brussels, Brussels, Belgium	2002	Curator
Carlo Carrá: Works on Paper	The Estorick Collection, London, UK	2001-2002	Curator
Carlo Carrá: 1900-1965: Las Mutaciones del Espiritu	Buenos Aires, Argentina; Santiago, Chile; Córdoba, Argentina	2001	Curator
Il Ritratto Italiano	Rome, Italy	1998	Curator
Sironi: Il Lavoro e l'Arte	Accademia Carrara, Bergamo, Italy	1997	Curator
Mario Sironi: el Trabajo y el Arte	Mexico City, Mexico; Buenos Aires, Argentina	1996-1998	Curator

== Publications ==
Selected publication history
Publication	Publisher	Year	Role
[Exhibition catalogue] SOLMI Ship Of Fools	Venice Biennale	2024	Author & Curator
[Exhibition catalogue] Henri de Toulouse Lautrec, L’altra realta’ nella Parigi di Fine Ottocento	ed, Rotas	2024	Author & Curator
[Exhibition catalogue] Italian and American Art, An Interaction 1930-1980	5 Continents Editions	2024	Author & Curator
[Exhibition catalogue] Giuseppe De Nittis La Donazione di Léontine Gruvelle De Nittis	Gangemi Ediitore	2023	Author & Curator
[Exhibition catalogue] De Nittis, La Strada da Napoli a Brindisi Editrice Rotas	Rotas Edition	2023	Author & Curator
[Exhibition catalogue] Bice Lazzari Modernist Pioneer	Estorick Collection	2022	Author & Curator
[Exhibition catalogue] Rileggere De Nittis, ogg, Guida al Percorso della Mostra (Italian & English)	Pinacoteca De Nittis, Barletta, Italy	2021	Author & Curator
Oscar Wilde's Italian Dream 1875-1900	Damiani Editore	2020	Author
[Exhibition catalogue] War &Art WWI-USA in Italy Destruction and Protection of Italian Cultural Heritage During World War I	Gangemi Editore, Rome	2017	Author & Curator
[Exhibition catalogue] War & Art: WWI – USA in Italy	Gangemi Editore	2015	Author & Curator
Italian Treasures in the US: An Itinerary of Art	Gangemi Editore	2015	Author
[Exhibition catalogue] Le Onde Waves of Italian Influence (1914-1971)	Gangemi Editore	2015	Author & Curator
[Exhibition catalogue] Gemme dell'impressionismo: dipinti della National Gallery of art di Washington	National Gallery of Art	2014	Author & Curator
[Exhibition catalogue] War & Art: Destruction and Protection of Italian Cultural Heritage During World War I	Gangemi Editore	2014	Author & Curator
[Exhibition catalogue] Giorgio de Chirico: Myth and Archaeology	Silvana Editorale	2013	Author & Curator
[Exhibition catalogue] Costantino Nivola: 100 Years of Creativity	Charta/Italian Cultural Institute	2012	Author & Curator
[Exhibition catalogue] Andrea Bianconi	Charta	2011	Author & Curator
[Exhibition catalogue] Giuseppe Ripa: Liminal	Charta	2011	Author & Curator
[Exhibition catalogue] Giulio Rimondi: Beirut Nocturne	Beirut Museum	2011	Author & Curator
[Exhibition catalogue] Giuseppe Ripa: Moondance	Charta	2010	Author & Curator
[Exhibition catalogue] Lucio Fontana: At the Roots of Spatialism	Gangemi Editore	2010	Author & Curator
[Exhibition catalogue] Instant Book: Italian Artists-New York	Charta/Italian Cultural Institute	2010	Author & Curator
[Exhibition catalogue] Federico Solmi	Charta	2010	Author & Curator
[Exhibition catalogue] Michele Ciacciofera: Silence	Charta	2010	Author & Curator
[Exhibition catalogue] Piety and Pragmatism: Spiritualism in Futuristic Art	Gangemi Editore	2010	Author & Curator
[Exhibition catalogue] Harry Bertoia. D ecisi che una sedia non poteva bastare	Silvana Editoriale	2009	Contributor & Curator
[Exhibition catalogue] Fausto Melotti With Photos by Ugo Mulas	Charta/Italian Cultural Institute	2009	Author & Curator
[Exhibition catalogue] Giorgio Morandi: 1890-1964: Nothing Is More Abstract Than Reality	Skira	2008	Author & Curator
[Exhibition catalogue] Paolo Mussat Sartor: Luoghi D'arte E Di Artisti: 1968-2008	JRP Ringier	2008	Author & Curator
[Exhibition catalogue] Giorgio Morandi	Charta/Italian Cultural Institute	2008	Author & Curator
[Exhibition catalogue] The Artworks Collected by La Colezione d'Arte di Arturo Toscanini	Mazzotta	2007	Author & Curator
[Exhibition catalogue] Lucio Fontana: At the roots of Spatialism	Gangemi Editore	2006	Author & Curator
[Exhibition catalogue] Giulio Aristide Sartorio 1860-1932	Chiostro del Bramante	2006	Author & Curator
[Exhibition catalogue] Giorgio Morandi e a natureza-morta na Italia	Mazzotta	2006	Author & Curator
[Exhibition catalogue] Achille Perilli Works on Paper 1946-1957	Estorick Collection, London	2006	Author & Curator
[Exhibition catalogue] Italian Abstraction 1910-1960	Estorick Collection, London	2006	Author & Curator
[Exhibition catalogue] Beyond Painting: Burri, Fontana, Manzoni	Tate Publishing	2005	Author & Curator
[Exhibition catalogue] Afro - the Memory's Alphabet	Italian Cultural Institute London	2005	Author & Curator
[Exhibition catalogue] Sironi Monumentale Cartoni e studi 1931-1940	Mart Rovereto	2005	Author & Curator
[Exhibition catalogue] I Tesori del Mare	Comune de Livorno	2004	Author & Curator
[Exhibition catalogue] Le souffle de l'âme	Exhibitions International	2004	Author & Curator
[Exhibition catalogue] Il Respiro dell Anima, Giorgio Morandi e la Natura Morta in Italia	Europalia Bruges Groeningemuseum	2003-2004	Author & Curator
[Exhibition catalogue] Painting Light: Italian Divisionism, 1885-1910	Estorik Collection, London	2003	Author & Curator
[Exhibition catalogue] Giulio Aristide Sartorio Impressioni di Guerra 1917-1918	Chamber of Deputies, Rome	2002	Author & Curator
[Exhibition catalogue] Mario Sironi: Between Futurism and the Urban Landscape 1914-1920	Estorick Foundation, London	2002	Author & Curator
[Exhibition catalogue] Giacomo Balla 1894-1910	Delta Graphic on behalf of Pinacotrca de Estado, San Polo, Brazil	2000	Author & Curator
[Exhibition catalogue] Sironi: Il Lavoro e l'Arte	Newton	1997	Author & Curator
[Exhibition catalogue] Il Metalibro	Edizioni Colonnese	1984	Author & Curator
Oscar Wilde: Verso il Sole	Edizioni Colonnese	1981	Author
