= Alessio Ruçi =

Albanian footballer (born 1996)

Personal information
- Date of birth: 31 January 1996 (age 30)
- Place of birth: Castiglione del Lago, Italy
- Height: 1.82 m (6 ft 0 in)
- Position: Defensive midfielder

Team information
- Current team: Tivoli

Youth career
- –2013: Cesena
- 2013–2014: Perugia
- 2014–2015: Cremonese

Senior career*
Years	Team	Apps	(Gls)
2015–2017	Cremonese	2	(0)
2015–2016	→ Vis Pesaro (loan)	25	(1)
2017	→ Bassano (loan)	7	(0)
2017–2018	L'Aquila	31	(1)
2018	Savoia	5	(0)
2018–2019	San Nicolò Notaresco	16	(0)
2019	Recanatese	7	(0)
2019–2020	Tolentino	12	(1)
2020	Fermana	0	(0)
2020–2021	Tolentino	30	(4)
2021	Carpi	2	(0)
2021–2022	Montegiorgio	28	(0)
2022	Roma City	4	(0)
2022–2023	Pomezia	11	(0)
2023–	Tivoli	6	(1)

International career
2012	Albania U-17	3	(0)
2014	Albania U-19	1	(0)
- * Club domestic league appearances and goals as of 6 January 2024

Alessio Ruci (born 31 January 1996) is an Albanian professional footballer who plays as a defensive midfielder for Italian Serie D club Tivoli.

== Club career ==
=== Cremonese ===
On 9 January 2015, Perugia loaned out Ruci to Lega Pro side Cremonese with purchase option. However just a few weeks later, on 25 January, Cremonese announced to have signed definitively Ruci by purchasing him immediately.

First match of Ruci with Cremonese came on 15 February 2015 against Bassano in where he was present on the bench for the entire match. He managed to make his professional debut in his second match with Cremonese on 10 May 2015 against Giana Erminio coming on as a substitute in the 87th minute in place of Alessandro Marchi.

In January 2017, he was loaned to Bassano.

=== Savoia ===
On 26 September 2018, Ruçi signed for Savoia.

=== Fermana ===
On 9 August 2020 he joined Fermana. On 23 September 2020, his Fermana contract was terminated by mutual consent due to "personal reasons". On the next day, he returned to his previous club Tolentino.

== International career ==
=== Albania U17 ===
Ruci was invited for the first time at the Albania national under-17 football team by the coach Džemal Mustedanagić to participate in the 2013 UEFA European Under-21 Championship qualification in October 2012. He played every minute in all 3 matches of the tournament.

=== Albania U19 ===
Ruçi was called up to the Albania national under-19 football team by the coach Altin Lala for the friendly match against Italy U19 on 17 December 2014.

== Career statistics ==
=== Club ===
As of 10 May 2015

Season	Club	League country	League		League Cup		Europe		Total	
Season	Club	League country	Apps	Goals	Apps	Goals	Apps	Goals	Apps	Goals
2014–15	Cremonese	Lega Pro	1	0	-	-	-	-	1	0
2015–16	Cremonese	Lega Pro	-	-	0	0	-	-	0	0
Total			1	0	0	0	0	0	1	0
Career total			1	0	0	0	0	0	1	0
