= Nik Spatari =

Italian painter, sculptor, and architect (1929–2020)

Nicodemo "Nik" Spatari (16 April 1929 – 25 August 2020) was an Italian painter, sculptor, architect, and art scholar. He created the "Parco-Museo Santa Barbara", known also as MUSABA, an open-air art museum realised in the 10th century St. Barbara monastery area close to Spatari's birthplace of Mammola, in south-eastern Calabria.

== Bibliography ==
- Nik Spatari, L'enigma delle arti asittite nella Calabria ultra-mediterranea, Reggio C., Iiriti ed., 2002, ISBN 88-87935-30-0
