= Maria Antonia Braile =

Albanian arbëreshë writer

Maria Antonia Braile (born San Demetrio Corone, Calabria) was an Italian-arbëreshë writer and the first Albanian woman writer to ever publish literature in Albanian. She is the sister of Salvatore Braile, another Italian-Albanian poet and writer, and sister-in-law of Maria Sofia Baffa Trasci.

She was born in San Demetrio Corone in Calabria July the 13 1894 and she married in 1913 Rocco De Benedetto. Braile published in 1917 in Calabria, Italy, a collection of poems in Arbëresh language, entitled Canti.

Braile is part of the Albanian world of poetry. Her poetry is simple and melancholic. She will be remembered as the first Albanian woman poet.
