= Zibad Rural District =

Rural district in Razavi Khorasan province, Iran

Zibad Rural District Persian: دهستان زيبَد
- Rural District
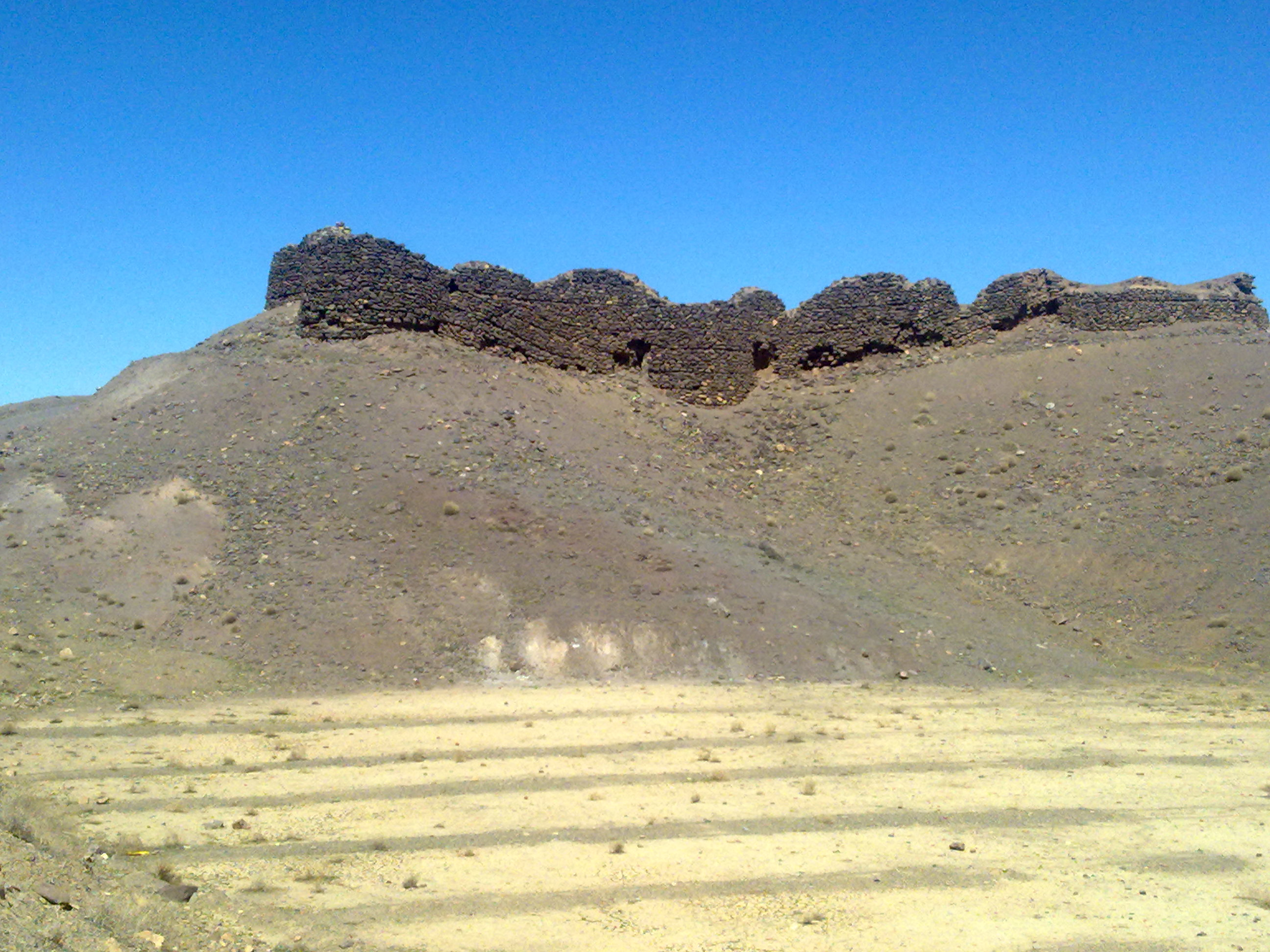
- Shelter of the last emperor of Persia, Yazdegerd III

- Location within Iran
- Coordinates: 34°19′N 58°26′E
- Country: Iran
- Province: Razavi Khorasan
- County: Gonabad
- District: Kakhk
- Established: 1987
- Capital: Zibad

Population (2016)
  - Total: 4,892
- Time zone: UTC+3:30 (IRST)
- Website: www.zibad.ir

Zibad Rural District (Persian: دهستان زيبد) is in Kakhk District of Gonabad County, Razavi Khorasan province, Iran. Its capital is the village of Zibad.

== Demographics ==
=== Population ===
At the time of the 2006 National Census, the rural district's population was 4,747 in 1,721 households. There were 4,243 inhabitants in 1,701 households at the following census of 2011. The 2016 census measured the population of the rural district as 4,892 in 1,941 households. The most populous of its 36 villages was Zibad, with 1,058 people.

=== Other villages in the rural district ===
- Beyhud
- Fudenjan
- Kalat
- Ruchi
- Sanu
- Saqi

== Overview ==
The village of Zibad was ratified as the center of Zibad Rural District in 1945. In the past 50 years due to severe drought, the population has migrated to the cities. Zibad, meaning beautiful, was a famous ancient place in Shahnameh. According to Shahnameh Ferdowsi (around 1000 AD), it was the place of a famous war called Davazdah Rokh (12 Hero) between Iran and Turan. Zibad also has an ancient qanat that may be more than 1,600 years old.

== Gallery ==
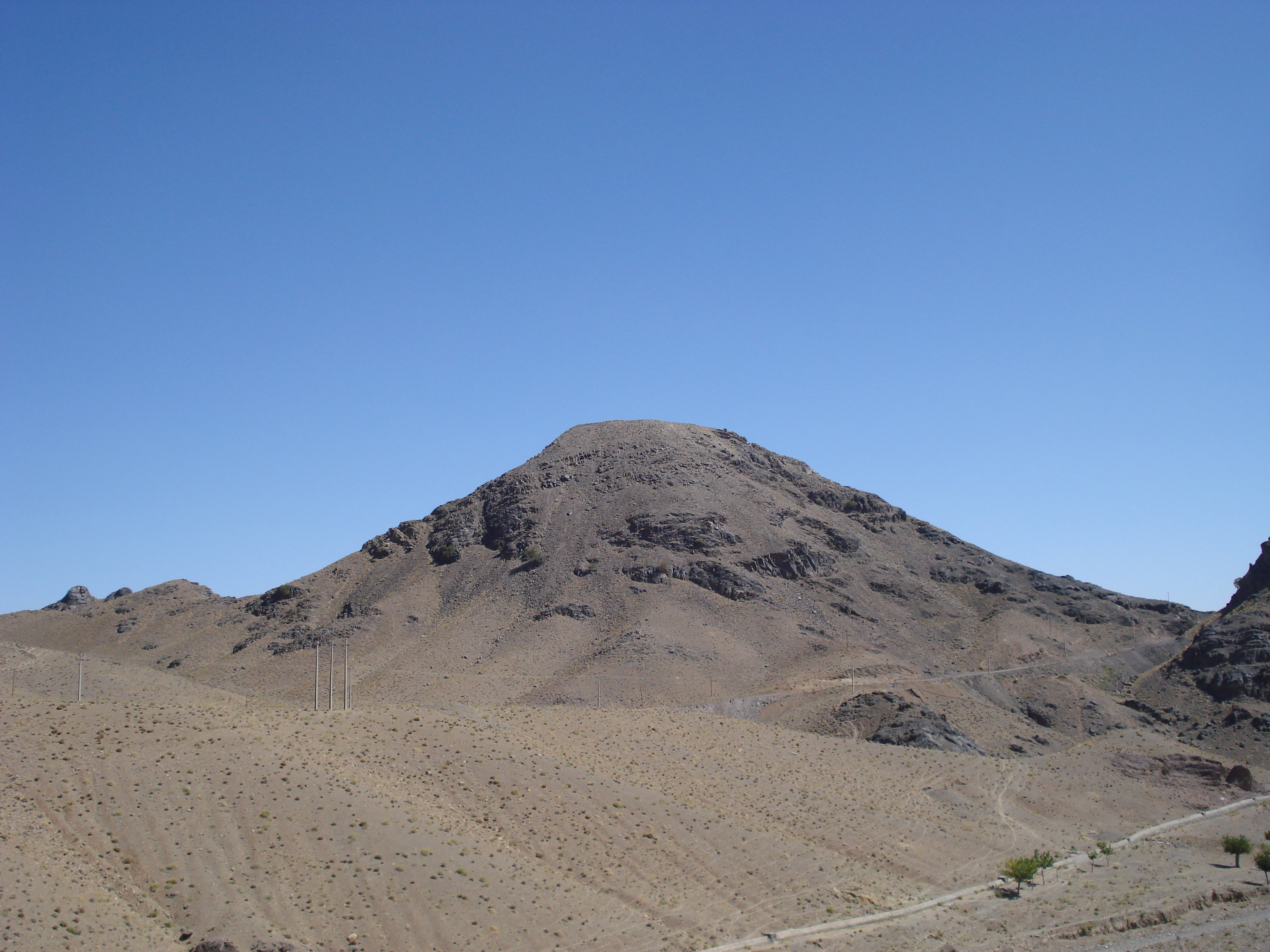
Qala Zibad-Shah Neshin-Sassanid

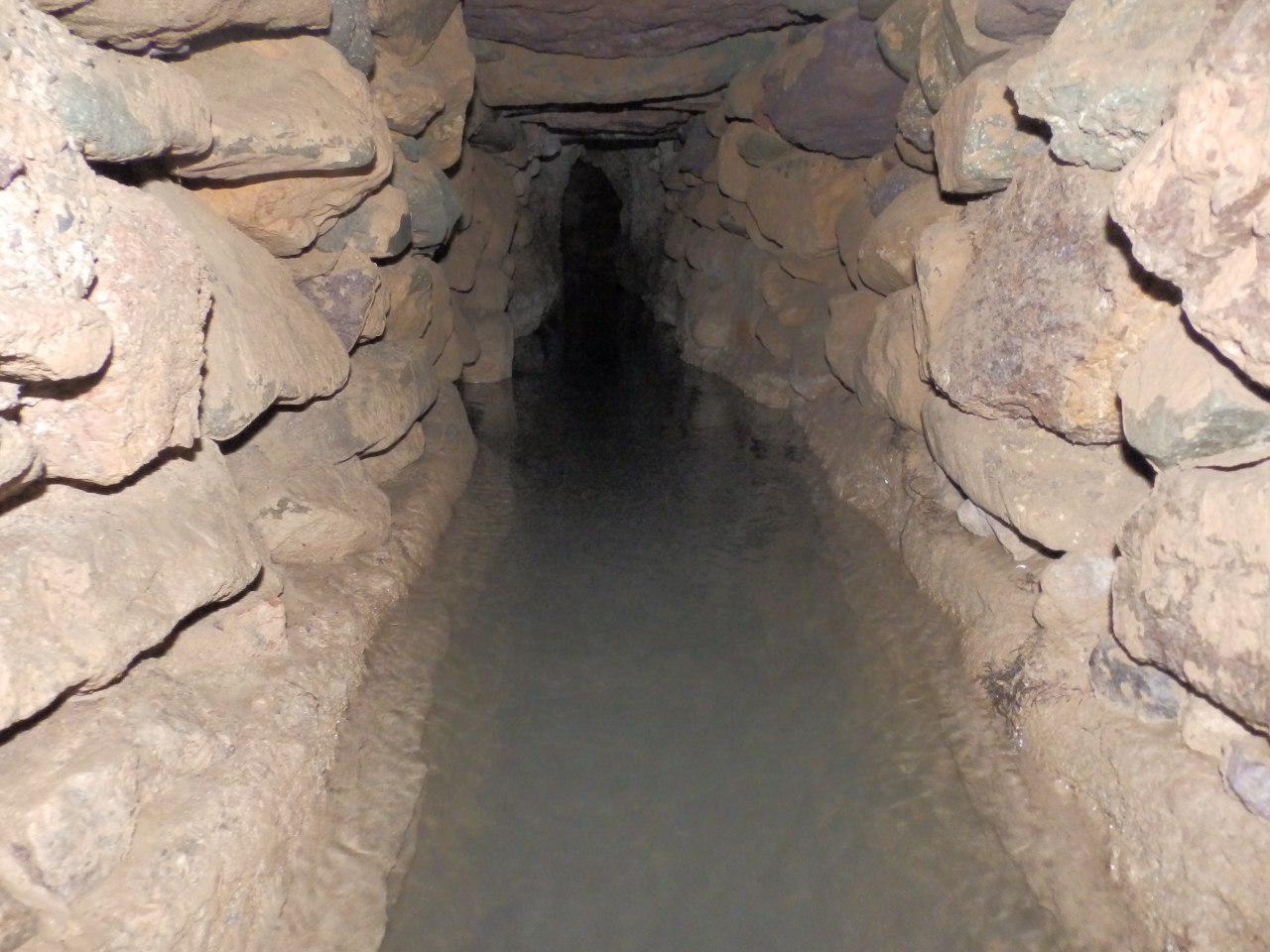
Kariz Zibad

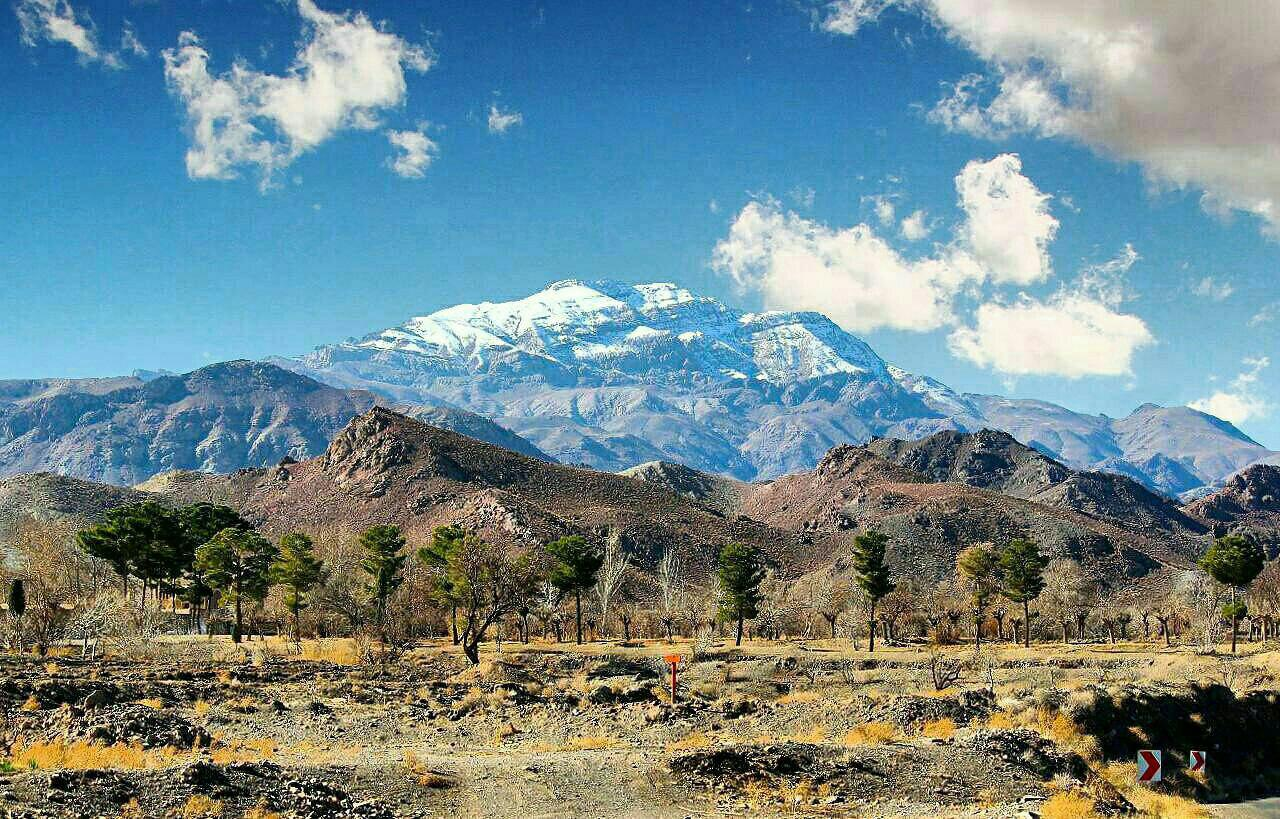
Zibad Mountain

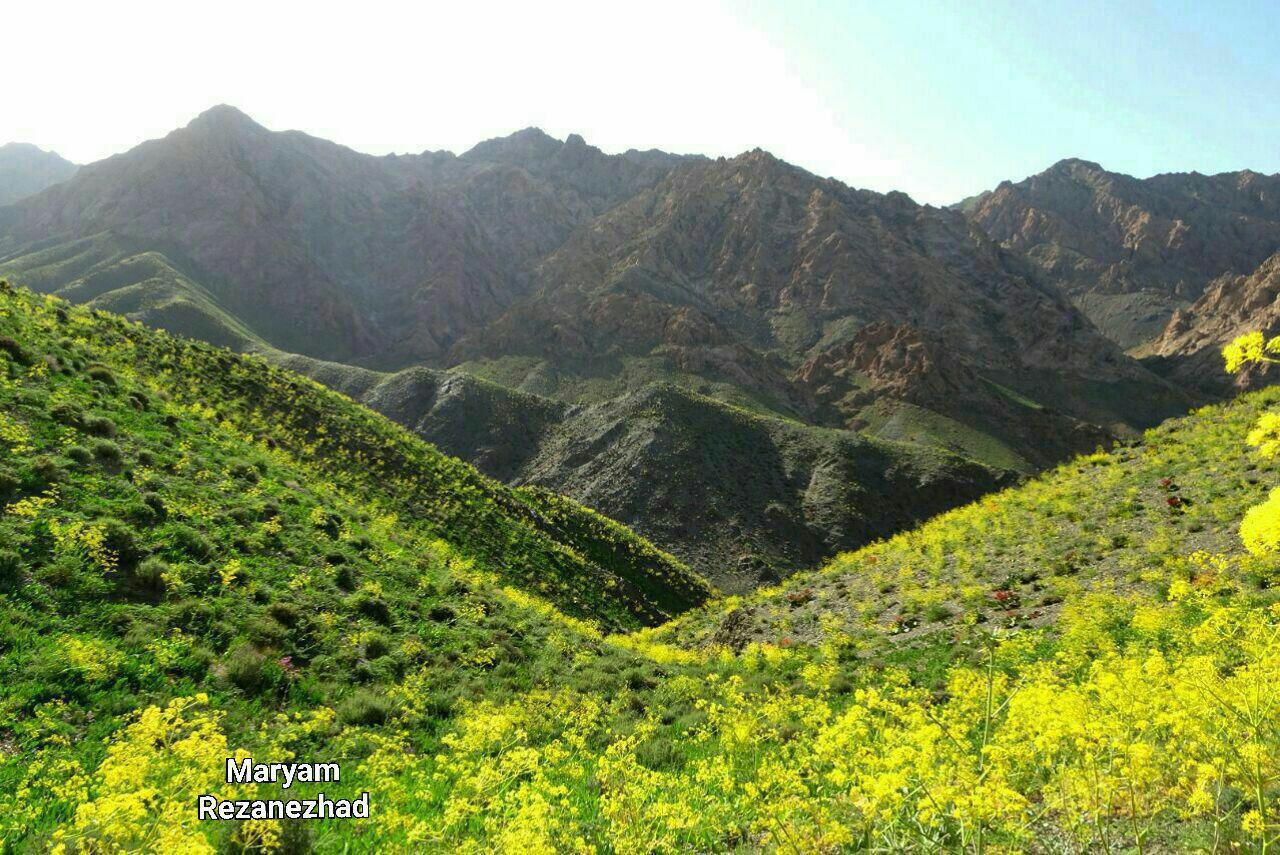
Ferula Zibad

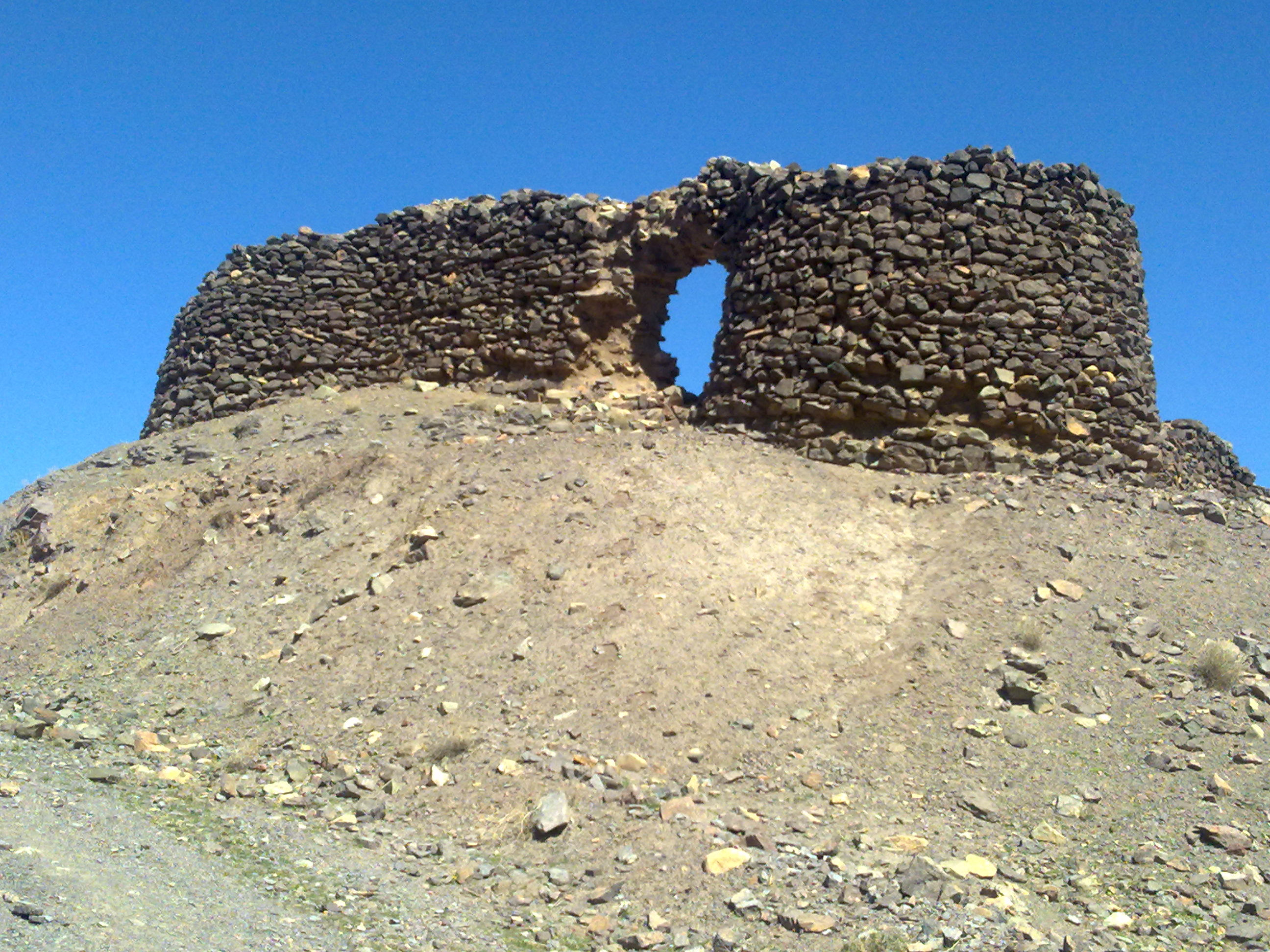
Sassanian Castle

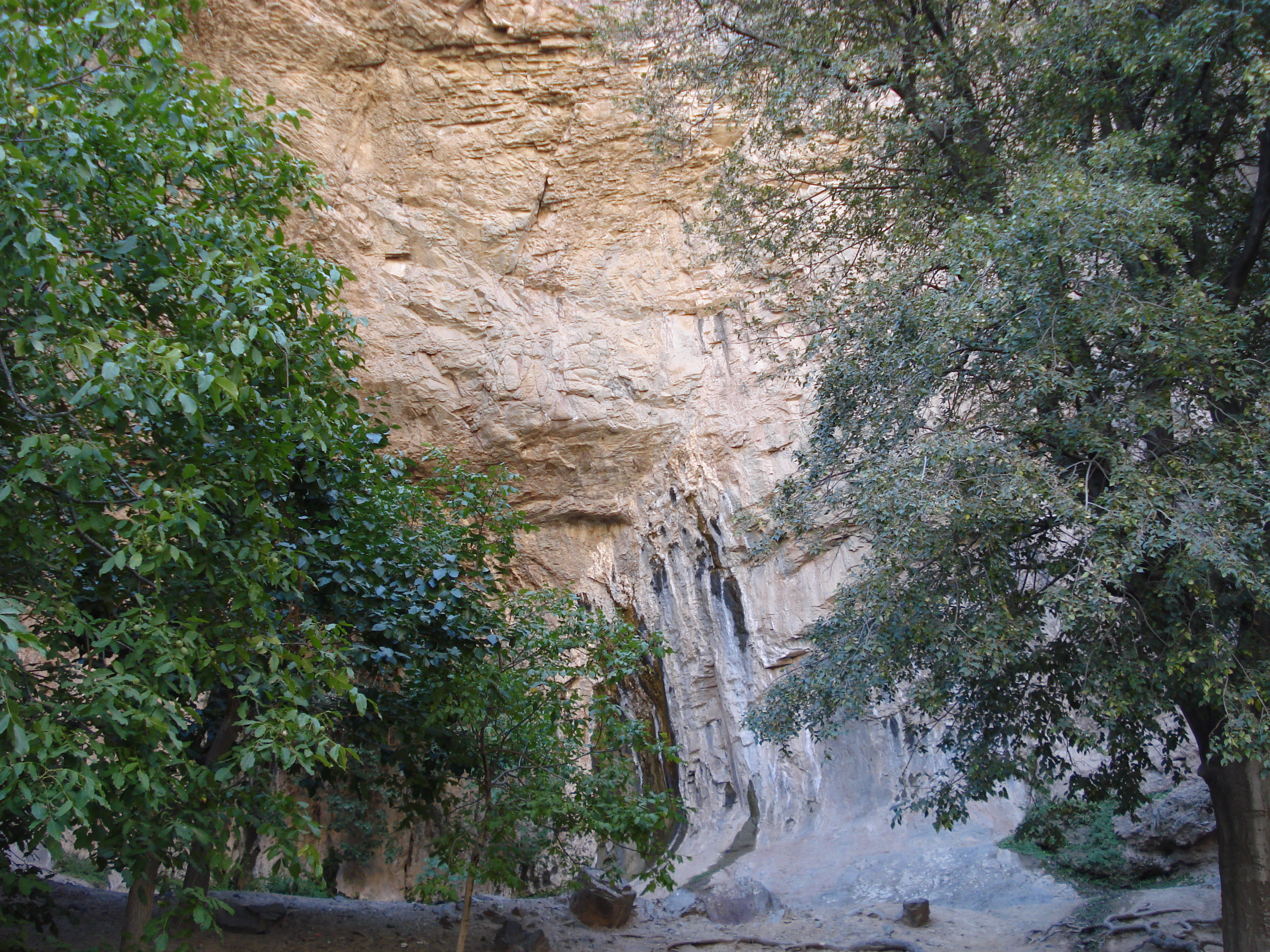
Darb-e Soufe, Zibad

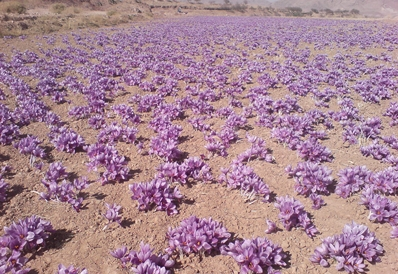
Saffron farm

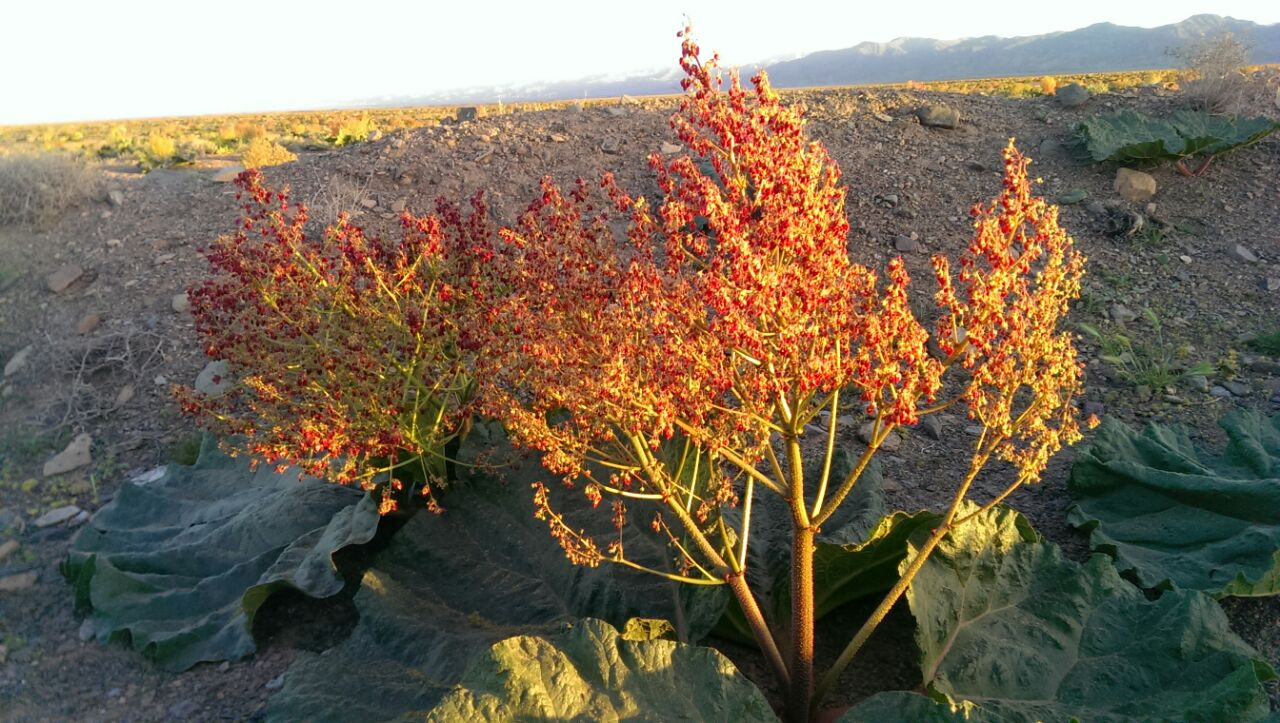
Rivas Zibad

== See also ==
- Davazdah Rokh
- Gonabad
- Kay Khosrow
