= List of ab anbars of Qazvin =

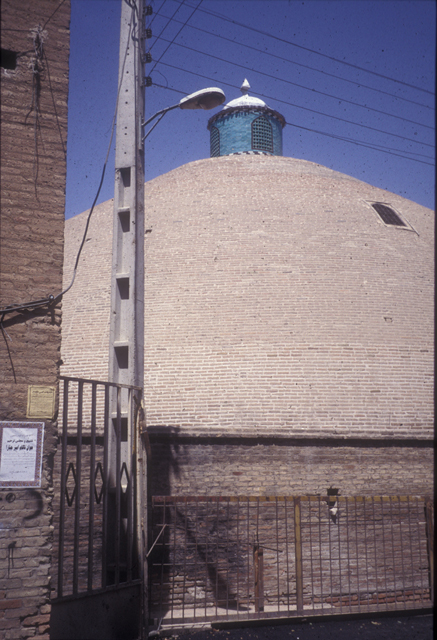
Ab anbar of Sardar-e Bozorg, in Qazvin, is the largest single domed ab anbar in Iran.

Qazvin is known to have had close to, or in excess of 100 drinking water reservoirs called ab anbars before modernization in the 20th century.

Only ten remain fully intact today. All are protected as national cultural heritage relics. The extant ab anbars of Qazvin are:

- Ab anbar of Jame’ mosque

Built in 1682 (1093 AH lunar) during the reign of Shah Suleiman I, located next to the Jame’ (congregation) mosque, with the benefactor listed as Ali Khan-e Nāmi (6, 410). This ab anbar has a second private stairway that opens directly into the tank, for lay-rubi. The Sarooj covered walls are 2.4 meters thick (3, 80) surrounding all sides of the tank.

- Ab anbar of Sardar e Bozorg

Two brothers by the names of Mohammad Hasan Khan and Mohammad Hosein Qoli Khan e Sardar who were commanders of the Qajar monarch Fath-Ali Shah's army make a vow to build a mosque, school, and ab anbar in the driest part of the city (3, 81) if they return victorious from a battle against the Russian army (1). This ab anbar was finished in 1812 (1227 AH lunar). Its walls are 3 m thick (3, 81).

- Ab anbar of Sardar e Kuchak

With 37 steps, 4 faucets located at various intervals, four domes, and four semi-windcatchers, this ab anbar was built in 1814 (1229 AH lunar) as part of a school-mosque-ab anbar complex by the same two brothers (3, 82).

- Ab anbar of Haj Kazem

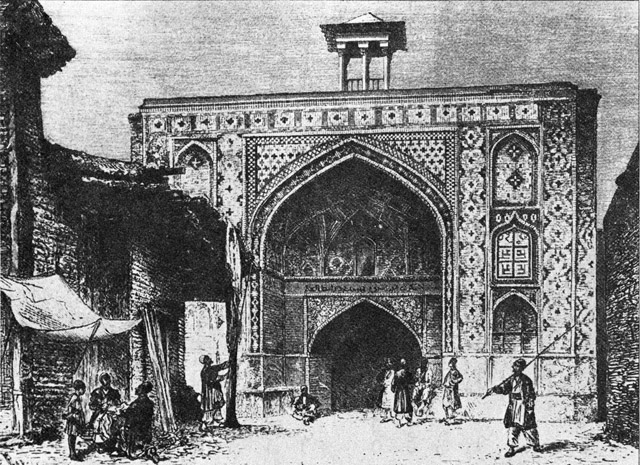
The sar-dar of the ab anbar of Haj Kazem, as sketched by French explorer Dieulafoy in the mid-1800s.

With 40 steps, 2 faucets, and 2 windcatchers standing 8 m tall, and storage walls 3 m thick, this ab anbar was finished in 1840 (1256 AH lunar) in one of Qazvin's drier neighborhoods. The inscriptions on top of the sardar mention Haj Kazem Kuzehgar and his assistant Haji Ismail as the architects of the ab anbar.

- Ab anbar of Hakim

With 36 steps, this ab anbar was finished in 1828 (1244 AH lunar) by Haj Mirza Hakim, a local physician. Next to the sardar, a saqqa-khaneh was built at the same time. This is a small enclave where people light candles in front of sacred images of Shia icons, and pray for requests (nazr).

- Ab anbar of Mola Verdi Khan mosque

Built in 1763 (1177 AH lunar) according to the inscription on top of the sardar, during the Zand era. The pasheer contains 2 gushvars.

- Ab anbar of Zananeh Bazar

Constructed under charity by a benefactor by the name of Haj Mola Abdol-vahhab, who was a famous cleric in the Qajar era, its entry is located inside the bazaar of the coppersmiths, has 43 steps, 4 columns inside the storage tank, 10 flat domes, 5 windcatchers, and also has a separate stairway for layeh-rubi that is also connected to the basement of the adjacent mosque (3, 82).

- Ab anbar of Agha

Also a relic of the Qajar era, with 30 steps, and walls 2.2 m thick.

== Dimensions and capacity ==
Fully intact surviving ab anbars of Qazvin in order of capacity
Ab anbar name	Dimensions (m)	Capacity (m^{3})
Sardar-e Bozorg	17 x 17 x 17	4900
Jame’ Mosque	37.5 x 10 x 10	3750
Nabi Mosque	36 x 10 x 10	3600
Sardar-e Kuchak	20 x 19 x 5.5	2090
Haj Kazem	26 x 7.5 x 10	1950
Hakim	18 x 18 x 6	1944
Agha	11.5 x 10.25 x 5.5	648
Razavi Caravanserai	14.5 x 6.5 x 5	471
Zobideh Khatun	11.5 x 2.65 x 6.5	198

== See also ==
- Iranian architecture
- Ab anbar
- Traditional water sources of Persian antiquity
