= Yakhchāl of Kowsar =

Yakhchal in Gonabad County, Iranian national heritage site

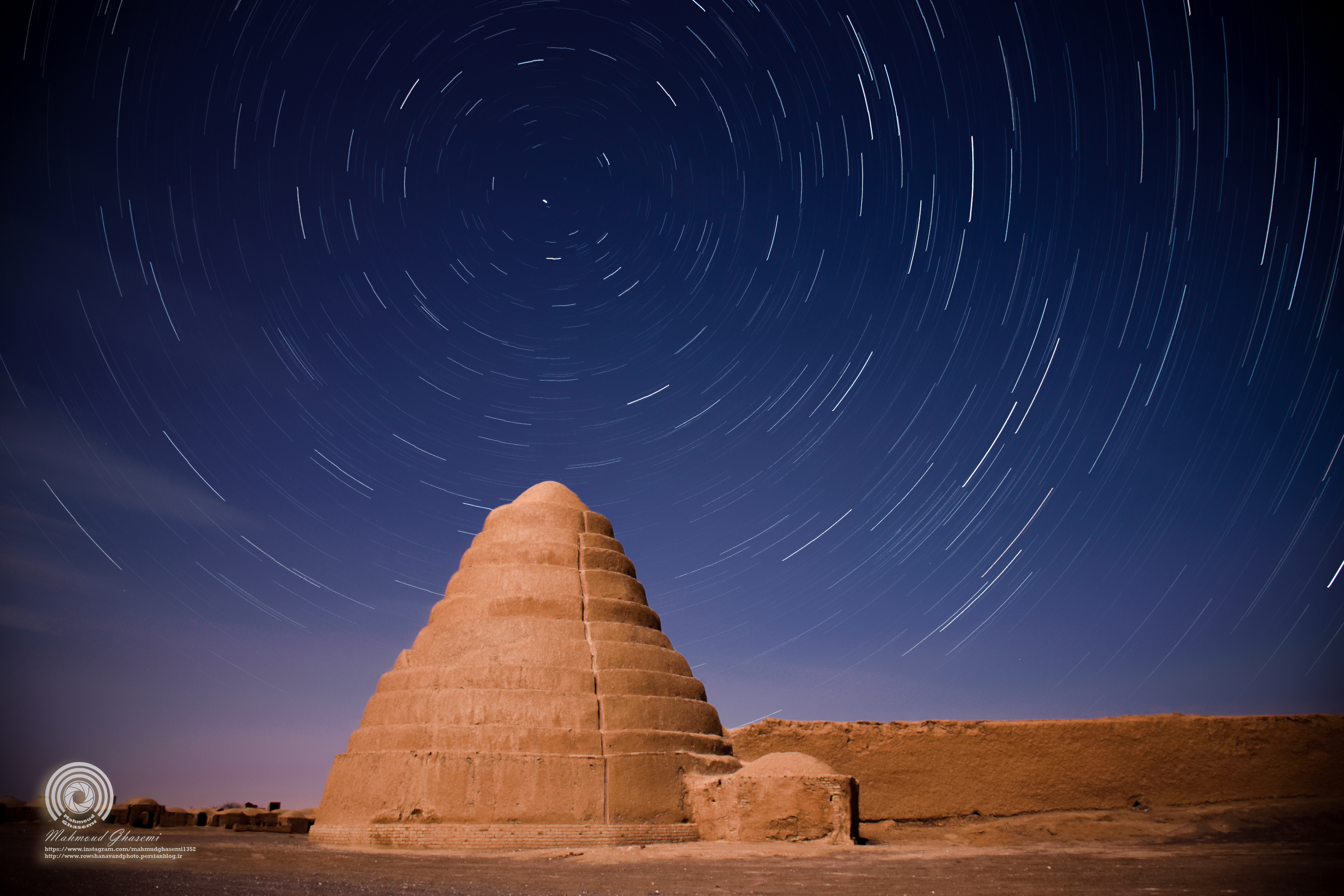
The Yakhchāl of Kowsarr

The Yakhchāls of Kowsar is a historical Yakhchāl belongs to the Qajar dynasty and is located in Bidokht, Razavi Khorasan Province in Iran. The yakhchа̄l is located at 34°22'7.01"N, 58°48'3.02"E.
