= Yakhchāl =

Ancient Persian ice house

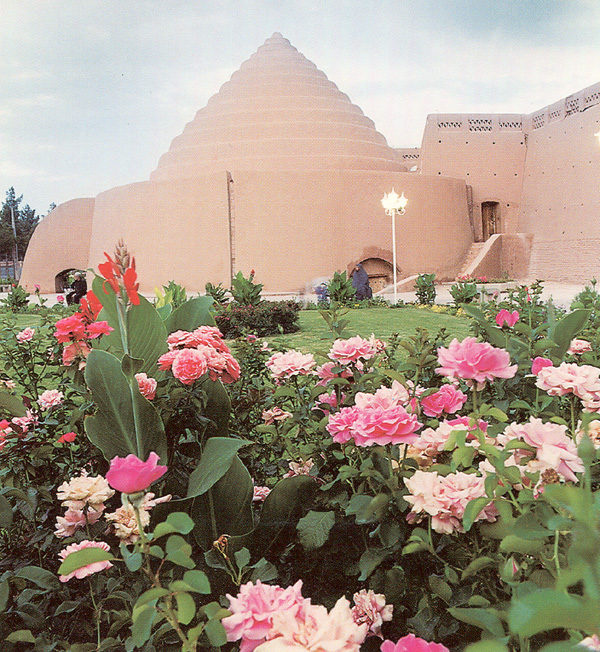
Yakhchāl of Moayedi, Iran

A yakhchāl (Persian: یخچال, lit. 'Ice pit'; yakh meaning 'ice' and chāl meaning 'pit') is an ancient type of ice house, which produced ice and desserts associated with it, like faloodeh, or sorbets. They are primarily found in the Dasht-e Lut and Dasht-e-Kavir deserts, whose climates range from cold (BWk) to hot (BWh) desert regions.

In modern-day Iran, Afghanistan, and Tajikistan the term yakhchāl is also used to refer to modern refrigerators.

The structure typically had a domed shape on the ground, a subterranean storage space, shade walls, and icy pools. It was often used to store ice, but sometimes was used to store food as well as produce ice. The subterranean space and thick heat-resistant construction material insulated the storage space year-round. These structures were built and used since ancient times in Persia.

== History ==
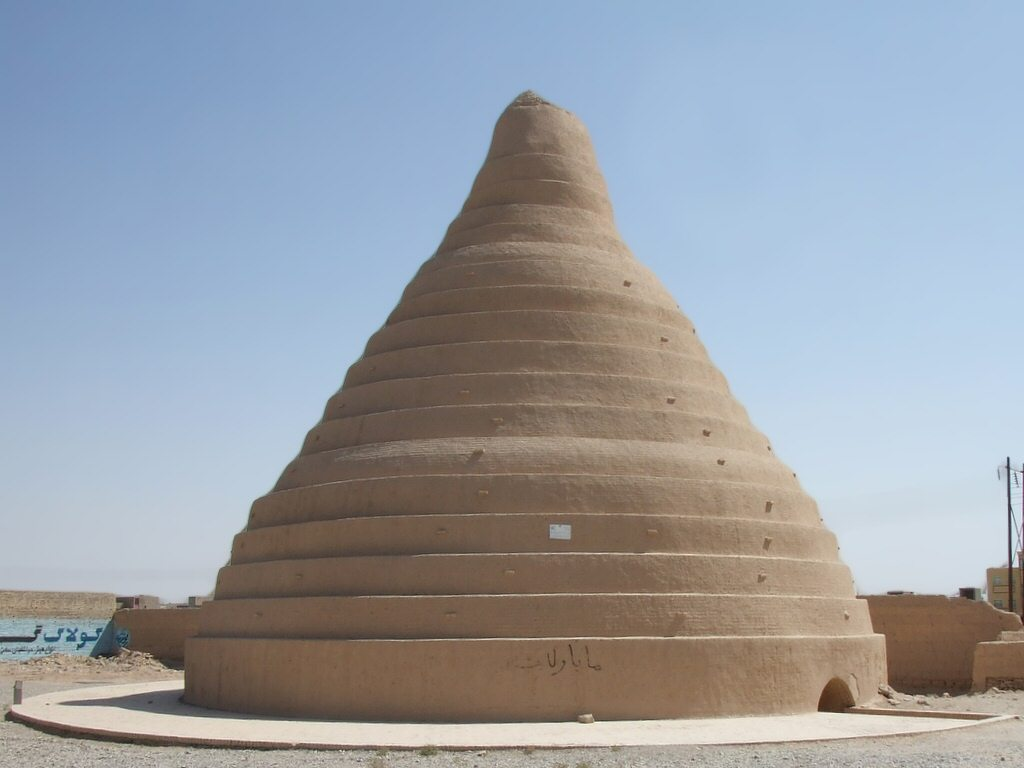
Yakhchāl of Abarkuh, Iran

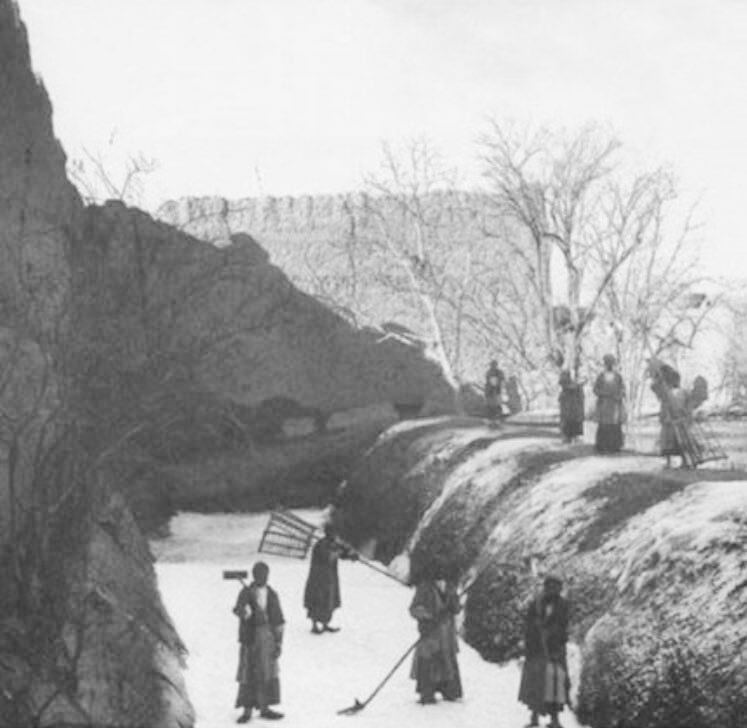
Workers clearing ice from ice pit at a yakhchāl

Records indicate that these structures were built as far back as 400 BCE, and many that were built hundreds of years ago remain standing, where Persian engineers built yakhchāls in the desert to store ice, usually made nearby. The ice created nearby and stored in yakhchāls is used throughout the year especially during hot summer days, for various purposes, including preservation of food, to chill treats, or making traditional Persian desserts like faloodeh and sorbets.

The Mughal emperors also recorded to adopt the technology of Yakchal. Humayun (r. 1530–1540, 1555–1556) expanded ice imports from Kashmir to Delhi and Agra, insulating blocks with straw and saltpetre to slow melting, a Persian technique. Early Baraf Khana (underground pits) stored ice, adapted from 'yakhchāl' for preservation. Akbar (r. 1556–1605) organized ice transport from Kashmir to Delhi, Agra, and Lahore via a 14-stage relay system, delivering ice in two days using saltpetre. The ab-dar khana at Fatehpur Sikri used sandstone cisterns and qanats, resembling yakhchāl, to cool water and make sherbets and early desserts. During the era of Jahangir (r. 1605–1627), Tuzuk-i-Jahangiri describes baraf khana as insulated cellars storing ice for palace cooling, food preservation, and kulfi, a frozen milk dessert with pistachios and saffron. Ice was harvested in Lahore from shallow ice pans and stored in straw-lined pits. Shah Jahan (r. 1628–1658) built a baraf khana in Sirmaur to supply Agra and Delhi's Red Fort. These underground structures with thick walls stored ice for drinks, food, and kulfi, symbolizing imperial luxury.

Although many have deteriorated over the years due to widespread commercial refrigeration technology, some interest in them has been revived as a source of inspiration in low-energy housing design and sustainable architecture. And some, like a yakhchāl in Kerman (over a mile above sea level), have been well-preserved. These still have their cone-shaped, eighteen meter high building, massive insulation, and continuous cooling waters that spiral down its side and keep the ice frozen throughout the summer.

== Design ==
A yakhchāl's engineering is optimized to take advantage of the physics of evaporative cooling and radiative cooling, and the fact that the arid, desert climate is low in relative and absolute humidity. The low relative humidity increases the efficiency of evaporative cooling due to the vapor pressure differential, and the low absolute humidity increases the efficiency of radiative cooling because the water vapor in the air otherwise inhibits it. In addition, in some desert climates, like those at high altitudes, temperatures drop below freezing at night. Their design is generally split into three areas:

1. The ice house or reservoir
2. The shade walls
3. The ice pits or pools

However, they varied because some used all three components, whereas others were simply a large shade wall over a shallow pool.

=== Ice house ===
A bâdgir and qanat utilizing evaporative cooling for a building–like a yakhchāl

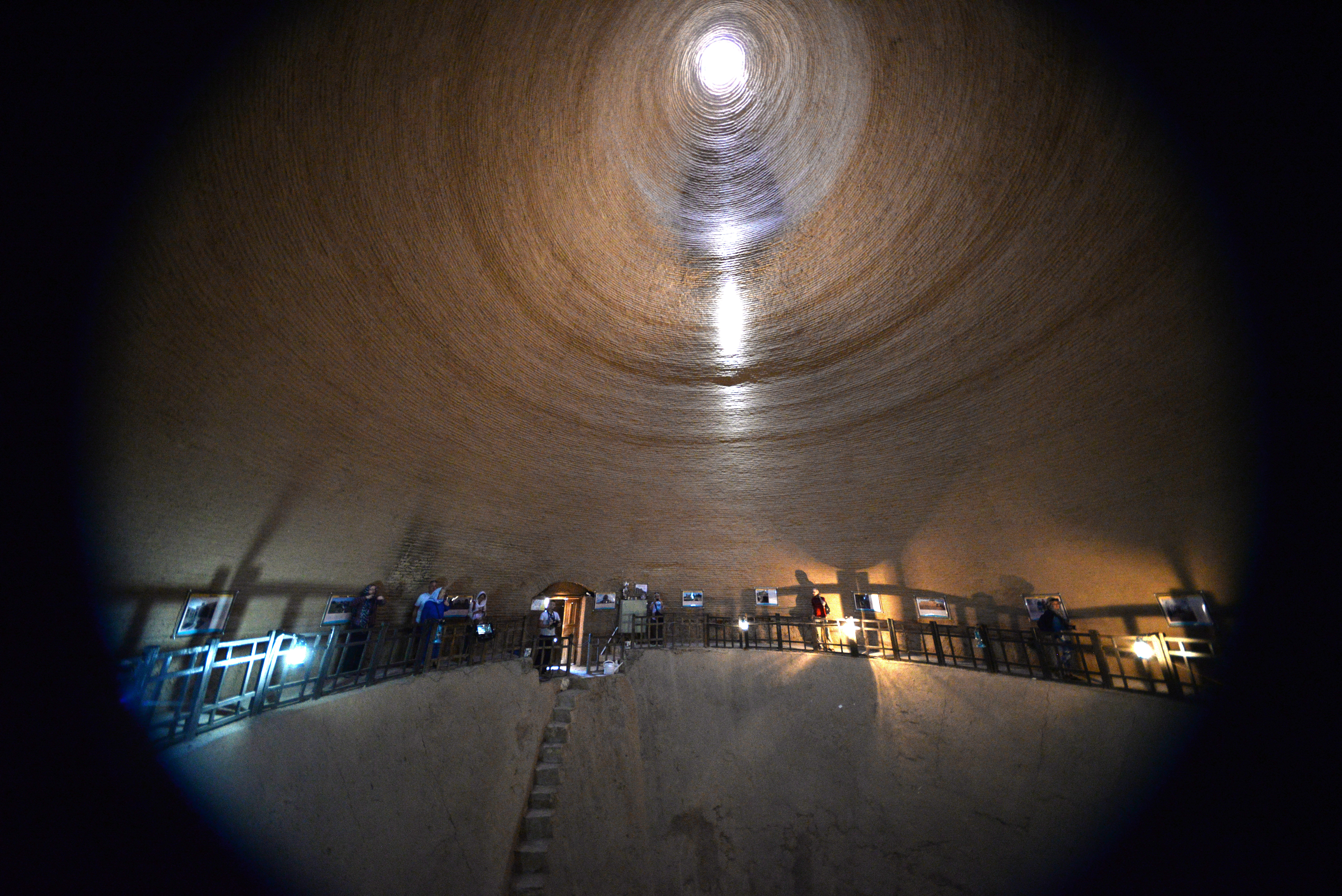
Interior of yakhchal in Meybod, Iran showing conical chimney and ice house interior

Most yakhchāls operate like a traditional ice house. The tall, conical shape of the building is to optimize the solar chimney effect, creating a convection current to guide any remaining heat upward and outside through openings at the very top of the building. Through this passive process, the air inside the yakhchāl remains cooler than the outside. At the same time, the building allows cold air to pour in from entries at the structure's base and descend to the lowest part of the yakhchāl: large underground spaces up to 5,000 m^{3} (180,000 cu ft) in volume.

The yakhchāl is built of a unique water-resistant mortar called sarooj. This mortar is composed of sand, clay, egg whites, lime, goat hair, and ash in specific proportions, is resistant to heat transfer and is thought to be completely water-impenetrable. This material acts as effective insulation all year round. The sarooj walls are at least two meters thick at the base.

They also often have access to a qanat (Iranian aqueduct), and are sometimes equipped with bâdgirs (windcatchers or wind towers) built of mud or mud brick in square or round shapes with vents at the top which funnel cool air down through internal, vertically placed wooden slats to the water or structure below. A bâdgir can also function as a chimney, releasing warm air out the top and pulling cool air in from a base opening or a connected qanat (air in a qanat is cooled by the underground stream). It is this construction that allows the ice house of a yakhchāl to take advantage of evaporative cooling, keeping the structure cool to well below ambient temperatures.

The ice inside the structure was often separated using wood, straw and mud to separate the layers of ice and keep them from sticking to each other. Furthermore, most designs incorporated a hole at the bottom that would connect back to the qanat, or simply act as a well for drainage.

=== Shade walls ===
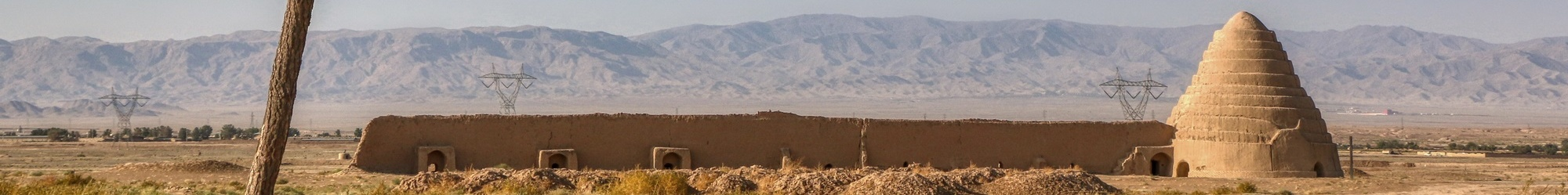
Exterior of Yakhchāl of Kowsar, Iran with shade wall

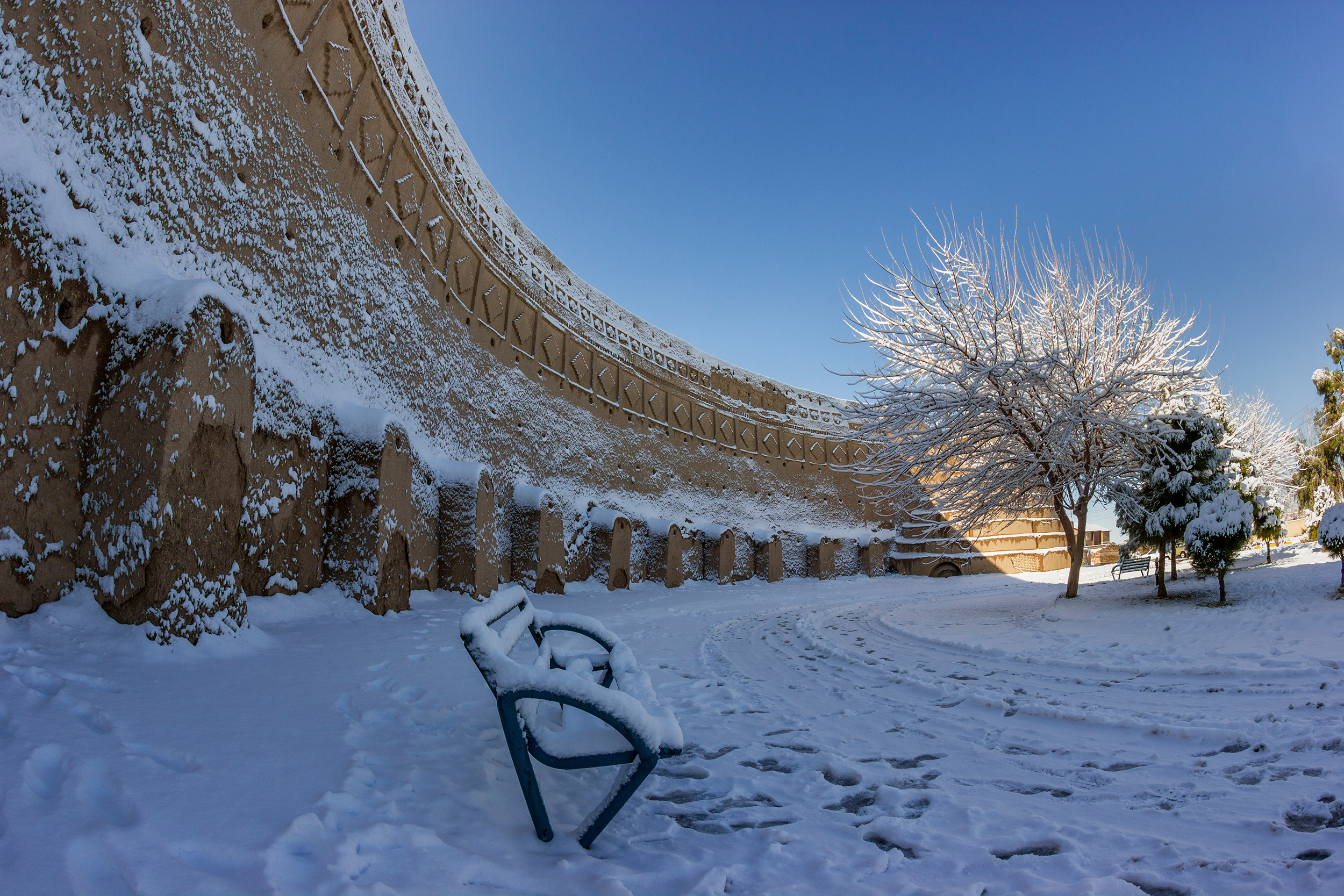
The twin Yakhchāls of Sirjan, Kerman Province, with arched shade wall inbetween

The temperature differences between shaded and non-shaded area in most areas where the yakhchāls were constructed often have temperature differences of nearly 15 °C (27 °F) to 20 °C (36 °F) cooler, making shade walls necessary for production and storage, as well as giving workers extra time to harvest ice. A wall is usually built in an east–west direction near the yakhchāl, often as high as 10 m (33 ft) and sometimes as high as 15 m (49 ft) to minimize convection losses as well as to provide shade. Due to their height, the base of the walls was often significantly thicker, and in some design the walls were arched and/or buttressed in order to support the load (as pictured at the yakhchāl at Sirjan).

Water is often channeled from a qanat to a yakhchāl, which is used to fill the provisioning pools or used to power the evaporative cooling throughout the ice house. Incoming water is channeled along the north side of the wall so that radiative cooling in the wall's shadow pre-chills the water before it enters the yakhchāl (as pictured at the yakhchāl at Kowsar). Ice is then brought from either the ice pools covered by the walls, or from nearby mountains to be stored in the reservoir.

=== Ice pools ===
Radiative cooling energy budget

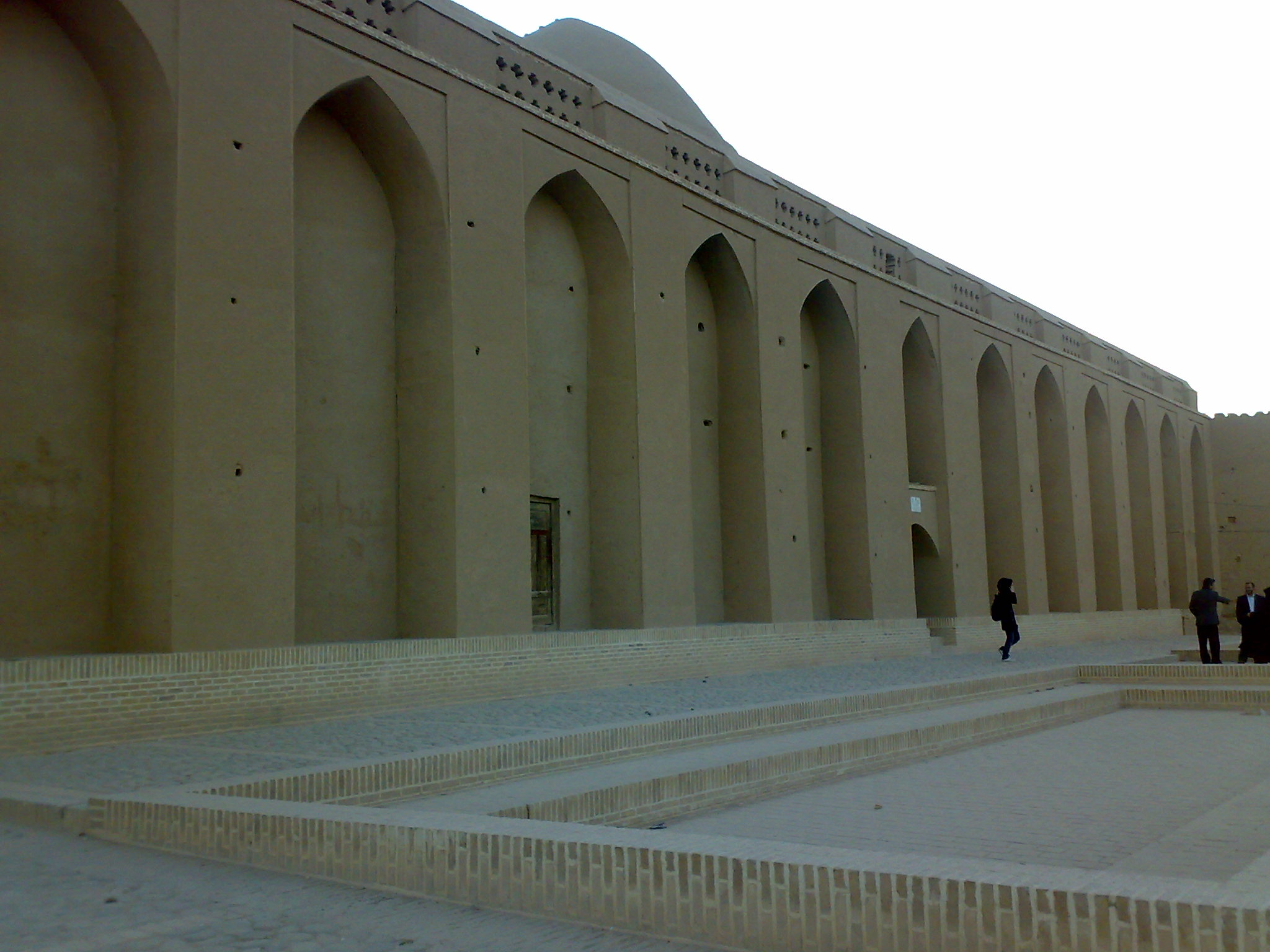
Ice pool beside the Meybod yakhchāl in Iran

Many yakhchāls contained ice pools. These pools were constructed to either provision the yakhchāl with water needed for evaporative cooling, so that ice could easily be prepared and transferred to inside storage, or for the production of ice on site. Sometimes these pools were channels that were square in shape of dimensions roughly 100 m (330 ft) × 10 m (33 ft) with a depth of 40 cm (16 in) to 50 cm (20 in), comparable to a reflecting pool. Often, no special material was used to finish the channel surface.

By night time, the ice pools would often have a negative energy budget:

- Heat conduction into the pool would be minimal due to the construction of the shade walls throughout the day and / or straw covering over the pool bed during the day.
- Hot air convection towards the pools would be minimal, either by location or again due to the height and position of the walls.
- Evaporation would take heat away from the pools, as with the rest of the yakhchāl.
- Due to the low moisture content of the air, very little of the heat radiated upwards from the pool would be reflected back to the pool by the air above it, allowing the pool's heat to be largely emitted into space.

This meant that ice pools could use the cold of the desert nights and/or radiative cooling to freeze water which would later be transported to storage as ice.

== See also ==
- Ab anbar – Traditional Iranian water reservoir
- Persian domes – Part of Persian architecture
- Soltaniyeh – City in Zanjan province, Iran
- Traditional water sources of Persian antiquity – Aspect of Iranian history
