= Ab anbar =

Traditional Iranian water reservoir

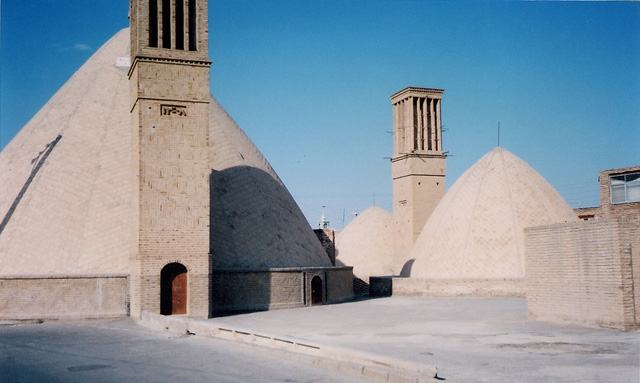
An ab anbar with double domes and windcatchers in the central Iranian city of Nain, near Yazd

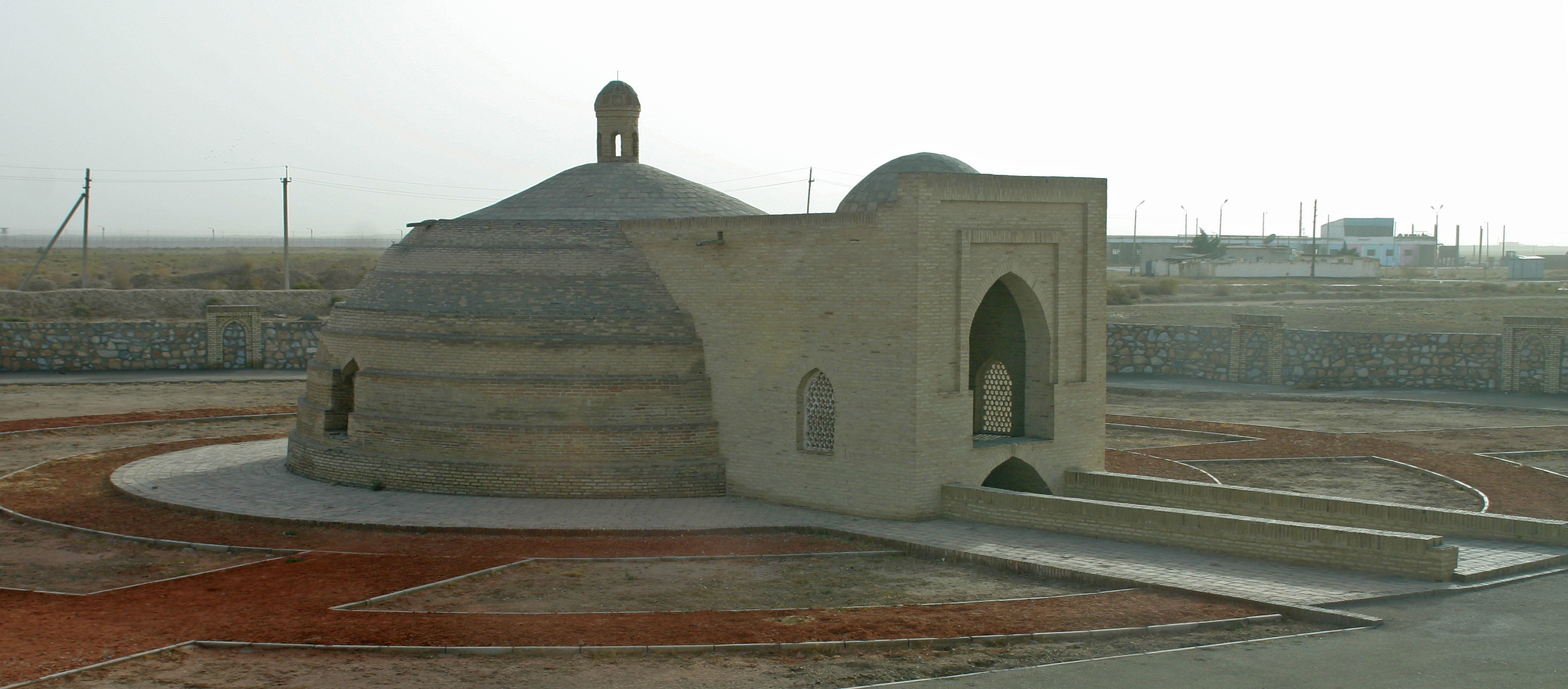
A sardaba in Uzbekistan

An ab anbar (Persian: آب‌انبار, lit. 'Water cellar') is a traditional Persian reservoir or cistern of drinking water in Greater Iran.

== Structure ==
To withstand the pressure the water exerts on the containers of the storage tank, the storage itself was built below ground level. This also provides resistance to earthquakes as many cities in Iran lie in earthquake prone areas. Since almost all ab anbars are subterranean structures capped barely above ground level, they possess inherently stable structures.

The construction material used for ab anbars were very tough and extensively used a special mortar called sarooj which was made of sand, clay, egg whites, lime, goat hair, and ash in specific proportions, depending on location and climate of the city. This mixture was thought to be completely water impenetrable. The walls of the storage were often 2 meters thick, and special bricks had to be used. These bricks were especially baked for ab anbars and were called Ajor Ab anbari. Some ab anbars were so big that they would be built underneath caravanserais such as the ab anbar of Haj Agha Ali in Kerman. Sometimes they would also be built under mosques, such as the ab anbar of Vazir near Isfahan.

The bottom of the storage tanks were often filled with metals for various structural reasons. The 18th century monarch Agha Mohammad Khan Qajar, is said to have extracted the metals from the bottom of the Ganjali Khan public baths to make bullets for a battle.

== Storage tank ==
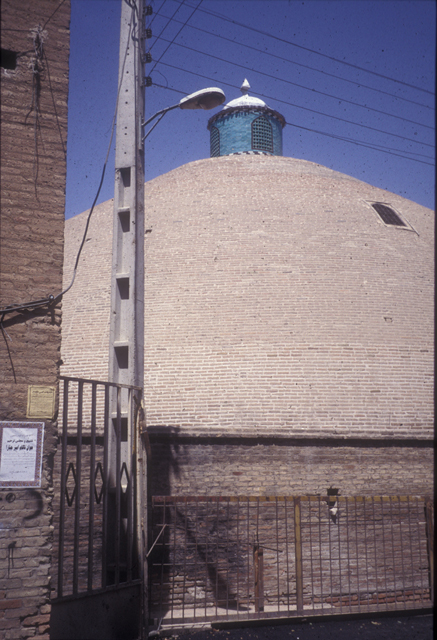
Sardar-e Bozorg Ab Anbar, in Qazvin, is the largest single domed ab anbar in Iran.

Some ab anbars had storage space tanks that were rectangular in design, such as in Qazvin, as opposed to cylindrical designs in Yazd. There were several designs for the arched roof of the storage spaces of each ab anbar, namely ahang, kalanbu, kazhāveh, or combinations of these depending on the features of the storage space.

In the particular example of Sardar-e Bozorg ab anbar in Qazvin, the storage space was built so large that it became known as the largest single domed ab anbar of Iran. Doming the square plan was not an easy task, yet dome construction was not something new to these architects as is evident from the numerous domed masterpieces such as Soltaniyeh.

Some sources indicate that the architects would first construct the storage space and then fill it up with hay and straw all the way up to where they could start constructing the dome. After finishing the dome, the straw would be set on fire, hence clearing the space inside. However holes can be seen in the walls of many storage spaces where scaffolding perhaps may have been used.

A storage space with a rectangular plan is much harder to dome than a circular one. It is not known why architects in particular places chose rectangular or circular layouts, considering that cylindrical spaces were easier to cover, and were deemed more hygienic for water storage due to lack of any corners in the space. Cylindrical tanks also had the advantage of experiencing homogenous forces throughout the walls caused by earth pressures, as opposed to the rectangular designs. Rectangular plans however have the advantage of containing larger volumes of water within rectangular property limits. Examples of ab anbars with a square plan include the Sardar-e Bozorg ab anbar in Qazvin by Sardar Hosein Qoli Khan Qajar and his brother Hasan Khan Qajar. Some ab anbars required columns to be built inside the storage space. The Sardar e Kuchak ab anbar in Qazvin uses a massive column in the center that splits the space up into four 8.5 X 8.5 meter contiguous spaces, each separately domed. The Zananeh Bazaar ab anbar of Qazvin uses 4 columns inside its storage tank. The Seyed Esmail ab anbar in Tehran is said to have had 40 columns.

== Access ==
In order to access the water, one would go through the entrance (sar-dar) which would always be open, traverse a stairway and reach the bottom where there would be faucets to access the water in the storage. Next to the faucet would be a built-in seat or platform, a drain for excess water, and ventilation shafts. The temperature of the water flow is dependent on the faucet location (i.e. depth from surface). Some storages would have multiple faucets located at intervals along the stairway. Possible contamination is minimised by lack of direct access to the entirety of the water stored. The storage compartment is completely sealed except for ventilation shafts or windcatchers. To further minimise contamination, the storage tank's interior was scattered with a salty compound that would form a surface on top of the water. The storage tank would then be monitored year round to ensure that the surface had not been disturbed. The water of course would be drawn from the bottom using the pasheer.

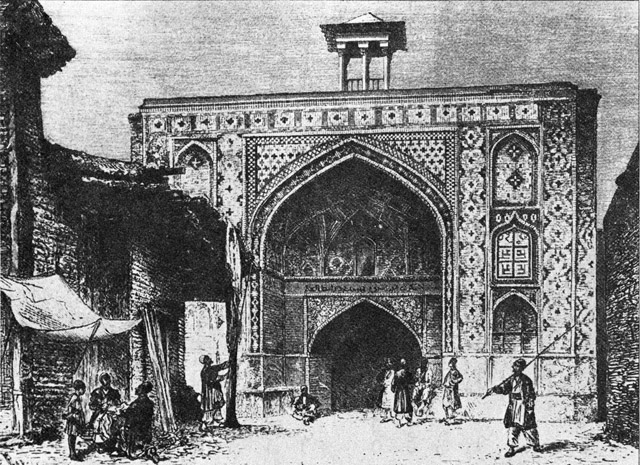
The sar-dar of Haj Kazem Ab Anbar in Qazvin, as sketched by French explorer Dieulafoy in the mid-1800s.

In some ab anbars, such as in Qazvin, the stairway and storage would be constructed adjacently alongside each other, whereas in others such as Yazd, the storage and stairway often had no structural connections to each other and the stairway was positioned independently. To prevent fatal fall distances, and possibly provide a brief relief when traversing the steps, there would be one to three landings built midway into the stairway. All stairways are linear.

The person responsible for filling the ab anbars (both private and public) was called a meerab. In effect, he was responsible for distributing the kariz network at various times. If a house wanted its ab anbar filled, they would ask the meerab to open up the kariz to their ab anbar. An overnight appointment would be enough to fill a typical house ab anbar. The ab anbar would also have to be cleaned once a year from settled sediments.

== Sar-dar ==
The Sardar (سردر) is an arched entrance that descends down into the ab anbar. It contains platforms built-in for pedestrians and a resting area after ascending out of the stairway. It is decorated and has inscriptions with poetry and the date of construction.

== Windcatchers ==
Ab anbars in Iran are known to have used anywhere from one to six windcatchers. Qazvin's ab anbars however, do not frequently use windcatchers like in other parts of Iran, perhaps because of climatic conditions; Qazvin has very cold winters and mild summers, unlike Yazd. Most of Qazvin's ab anbars are only equipped with ventilation shafts or semi-windcatchers. Ab anbars in Yazd, Kashan, Naeen, and other hot climate cities of Iran on the other hand extensively use windcatchers for cooling and ventilation purposes.

The way windcatchers work is that the moving air masses (wind, breeze, etc.) at the top of windcatchers create a pressure gradient between the top of the windcatcher and its base, inside, at the bottom of the shaft. This pressure gradient sucks out rising hot air from inside the shaft while the colder dense air remains. The superb heat-resistant material of the walls of the ab anbar further create an insulating effect that tends to lower the temperature inside an ab anbar, similar to a cave. The ventilating effect of the windcatchers prevent any stagnant air and hence any dew or humidity from forming inside, and the overall effect is pure, clean, cold water all year round.

== Glossary of terms for this article ==
Ab-anbar آب‌انبار
Literal translation: Ab meaning water and Anbar meaning storage facility. A specially designed subterranean space that holds clean water, usually employing windcatchers and fed by karizes.
Gushvār گوشوار
Something that occurs in symmetrical form on both sides of an element (e.g., two little rooms on the sides of a hall), entrance, etc.
Kariz كاریز
An underground water channel similar to a Qanat.
Layeh-rubi لایه‌روبی
The periodic cleansing of Qanats, Karizes, and Ab anbars from sediments that gradually settle as water passes by.
Maz-har مظهر
The first location where a Kariz or Qanat surfaces.
Meerab میراب/میرآب
A person who was responsible for distributing (providing access) water into ab anbars via underground channels such as Qanats.
Nazr نذر
A type of prayer in which a person asks for a favor in return for making a promise to a sacred entity.
Pasheer پاشير
The lowest point of an ab anbar stairway; the location where a faucet is installed to provide water from the ab anbar storage tank.
Qanat قنات
A system of connected wells, usually originating from elevated locations that direct water to locations far away via underground channels to a lower elevated maz-har.
Saqqa-khaneh سقاخانه
A place (usually an enclave in an alley) where candles are lit and prayers (or nazr) are made.
Sar-dar سَردَر
A gate-like entrance to a building, ab anbar, etc. The over-door decorations of this entrance.
Sarooj ساروج
A special mortar made of sand, clay, egg whites, lime, goat hair, and ashes in specific proportions, and was very resistant to water penetration.

== Time for filling ==
The time for filling the water reservoir was January and February, when there was no agriculture and water could be stored. Therefore, the water was kept in the tank for one year. To prevent it from rotting, a salt lick was added to the water from the top of the tank. Due to the stagnation of water, the salt lick did not dissolve throughout the water and over time a dense saltwater layer formed at the bottom of the tank, about one meter. Because of this, the tap was built one meter above the bottom of the tank. After the water of the tank ran out, before refilling it, the saltwater on the floor of the tank was cleaned. This was a difficult and demanding task which required a crew of labourers.

== See also ==
- History of water supply and sanitation
  - Ancient water conservation techniques
- Traditional water sources of Persian antiquity
  - List of ab anbars of Qazvin
  - Yakhchal
