= Traditional water sources of Persian antiquity =

Aspect of Iranian history

Most rivers in Iran are seasonal and have traditionally not been able to supply the needs of urban settlements. Major rivers like the Arvand, Aras, Zayandeh, Sefid and Atrak were few and far between in Persia.

With the growth of urban settlements during the ages, locally dug deep wells (up to 100 meters deep) could no longer keep up with the demand, leading to the systematic digging of a specialized network of canals known as Qanat.

== Qanat and Kariz ==
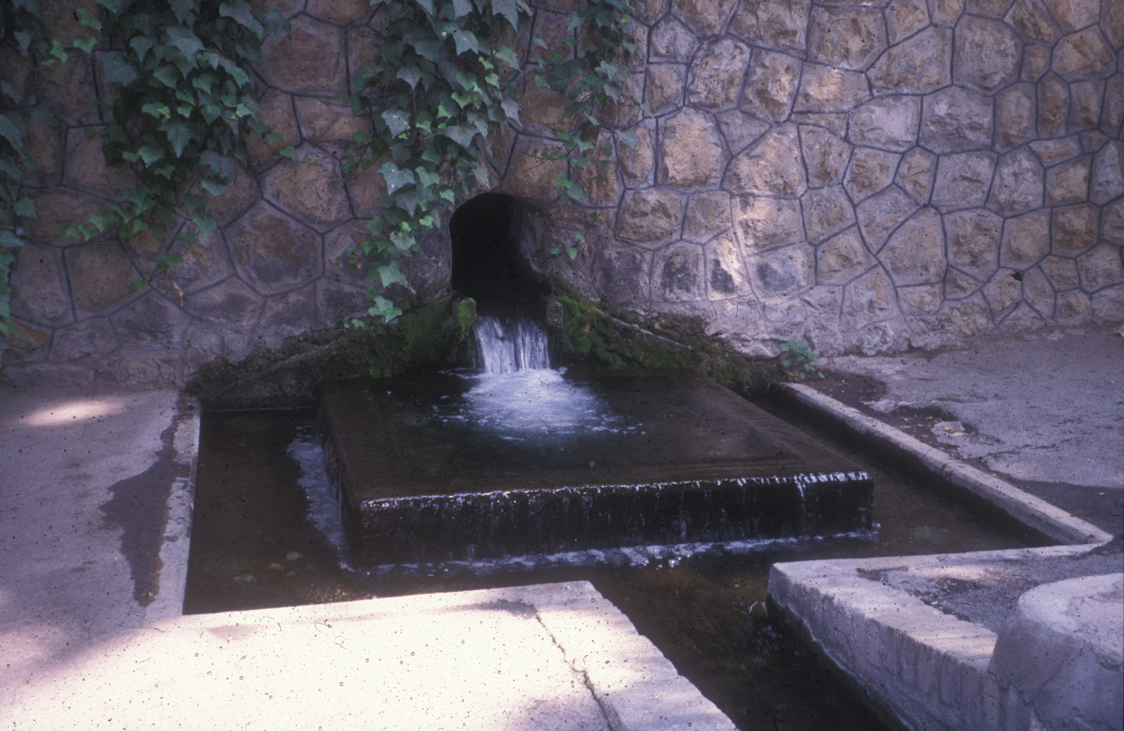
A Kariz surfacing in Niavaran, Tehran. It is used for watering the grounds of The National Library of Iran.

Persia's Qanat system is thousands of years old. The city Zarch in central Iran has the oldest and longest Qanat (over 3000 years and 71 km long) and other 3000 years old Qanats have been found in northern Iran. The Qanats mostly came in from higher elevations, and were split into a distributing network of smaller underground canals called kariz when reaching the city. Like Qanats, these smaller canals were below ground (~20 steps), and were built such that they were very difficult to contaminate. These underground aqueducts, built thousands of years ago suffer no evaporation loss and are ideally suited for drinking water since there is no pollution danger.

But with the further growth of the city in Persian lands, even the Qanats could not respond to the needs of residents. That is when some wealthy inhabitants started building private reservoirs called ab anbar (Persian آب انبار).

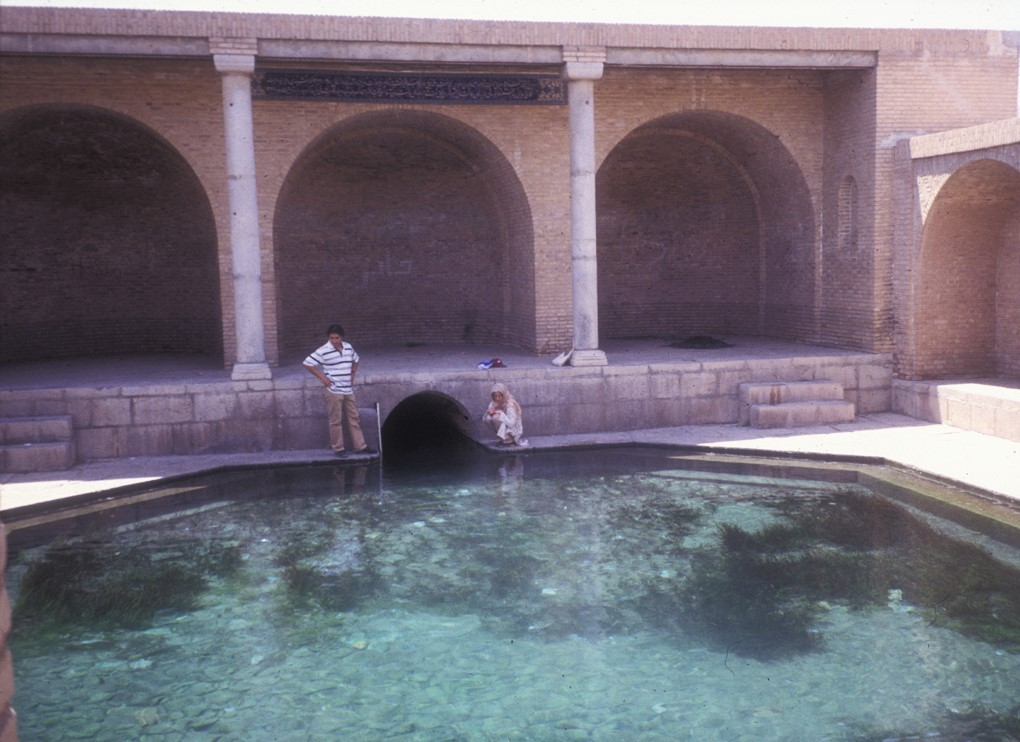
This Qanat surfacing in Fin is from a spring thought to be several thousand years in running, called The Spring of Solomon ("Cheshmeh-ye Soleiman"). It is thought to have been feeding the Sialk area since antiquity.

In the middle of the twentieth century, it is estimated that approximately 50,000 qanats were in use in Iran, each commissioned and maintained by local users. Of these only 25,000 remain in use as of 1980.

One of the oldest and largest known qanats is in the Iranian city of Gonabad which after 2700 years still provides drinking and agricultural water to nearly 40,000 people. Its main well is more than 360 meters deep and the qanat is 45 kilometers long. Yazd, Khorasan and Kerman are the known zones for their dependence with an extensive system of qanats.

In traditional Persian architecture, a Kariz (کاریز) is a small Qanat, usually within a network inside an urban setting. Kariz is what distributes the Qanat into its final destinations.

=== Kariz in Persia ===
Qanats of Gonabad also is called kariz Kai Khosrow is one of the oldest and largest qanats in the world built between 700 BC to 500 BC. It is located at Gonabad, Razavi Khorasan Province, Iran. This property contains 427 water wells with total length of 33113 meters. This site were first added to the UNESCO's list of tentative World Heritage Sites in 2007, then officially inscribed in 2016 with several other quants under the World Heritage Site name of "The Persian Qanat".

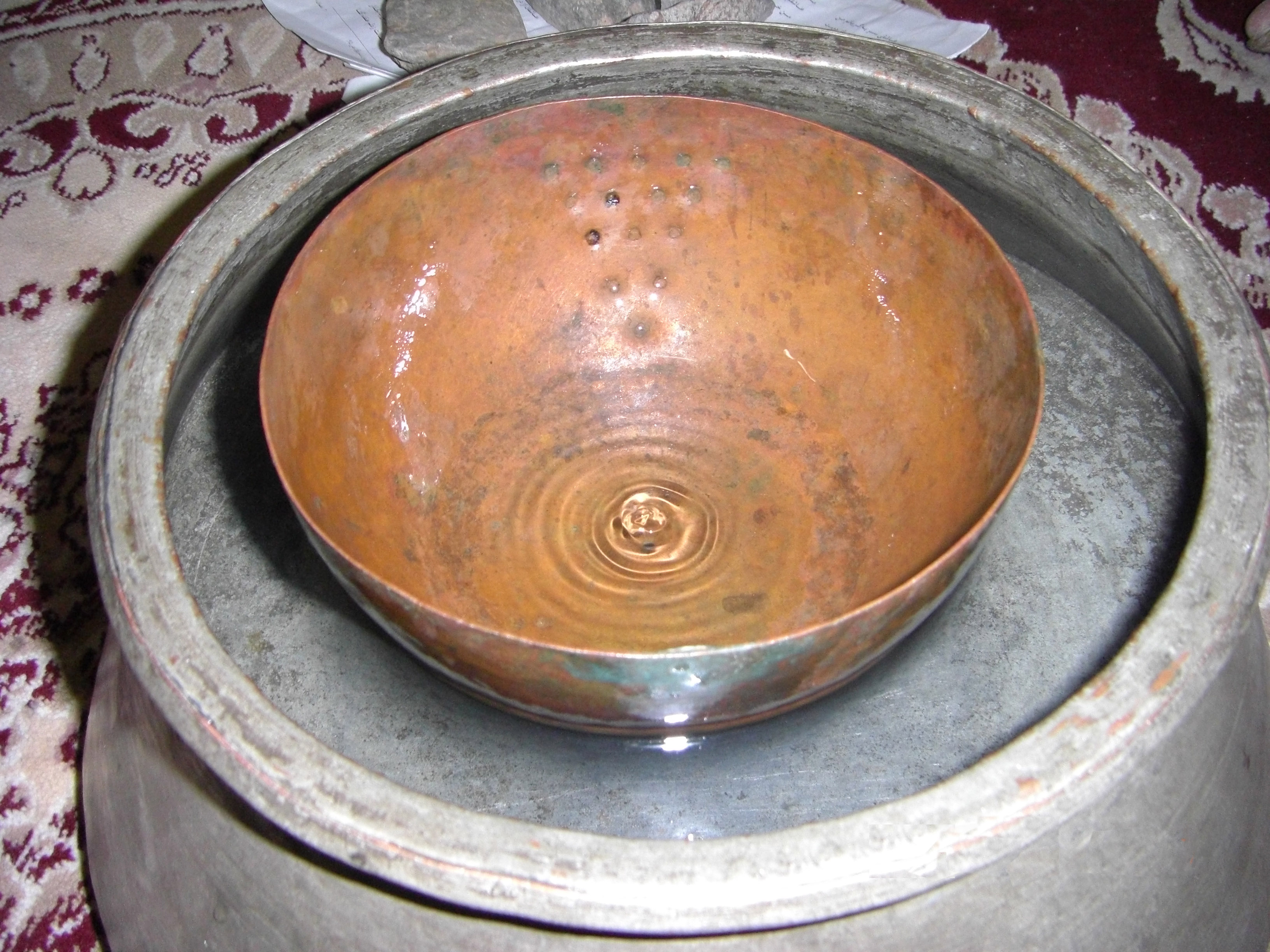
Ancient Persian clock

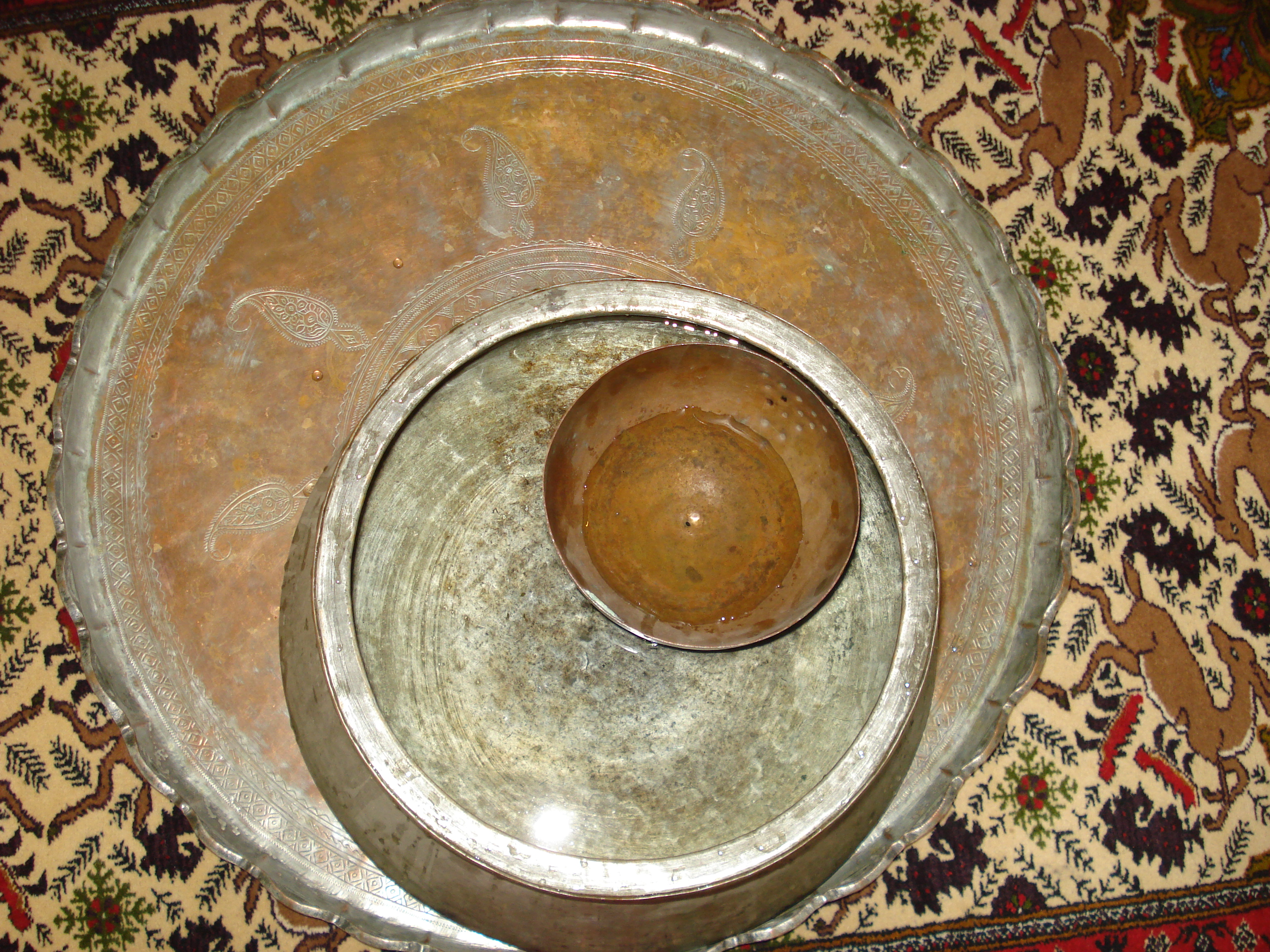
Ancient Persian clock in Qanats of Gonabad Zibad

According to Callisthenes, the Persians were using Water clock in 328 BCE to ensure a just and exact distribution of water from qanats to their shareholders for agricultural irrigation. The use of water clocks in Iran, especially in Qanats of Gonabad and kariz Zibad, dates back to 500BCE. Later they were also used to determine the exact holy days of pre-Islamic religions, such as the Nowruz, Chelah, or Yaldā – the shortest, longest, and equal-length days and nights of the years. The Water clock, or Fenjaan, was the most accurate and commonly used timekeeping device for calculating the amount or the time that a farmer must take water from Qanats of Gonabad until it was replaced by more accurate current clocks. Many of the Iranian qanats bear some characteristics which allow us to call them feat of engineering, considering the intricate techniques used in their construction. The eastern and central regions of Iran hold the most qanats due to low precipitation and lack of permanent surface streams, whereas a small number of qanats can be found in the northern and western parts which receive more rainfall and enjoy some permanent rivers. Respectively the provinces Khorasan Razavi, Southern Khorasan, Isfahan and Yazd accommodate the most qanats, but from the viewpoint of water discharge the provinces Isfahan, Khorasan Razavi, Fars and Kerman are ranked first to fourth.

It is Henri Goblot who explores the genesis of qanat for the first time. He argues in his book entitled “Qanats; a Technique for Obtaining Water” the ancient Iranians made use of the water that the miners wished to get rid of it, and founded a basic system named qanat or Kariz to supply the required water to their farm lands. According to Goblot, this innovation took place in the northwest of the present Iran somewhere bordering Turkey and later was introduced to the neighboring Zagros Mountains.

According to an inscription left by Sargon II the king of Assyria, In 714 BC he invaded the city of Uhlu lying in the northwest of Uroomiye lake that lay in the territory of Urartu empire, and then he noticed that the occupied area enjoyed a very rich vegetation even though there was no river running across it. So he managed to discover the reason why the area could stay green, and realized that there were some qanats behind the matter. In fact it was Ursa, the king of the region, who had rescued the people from thirst and turned Uhlu into a prosperous and green land. Goblot believes that the influence of the Medeans and Achaemenids made the technology of qanat spread from Urartu (in the western north of Iran and near the present border between Iran and Turkey) to all over the Iranian plateau. It was an Achaemenid ruling that in case someone succeeded in constructing a qanat and bringing groundwater to the surface in order to cultivate land, or in renovating an abandoned qanat, the tax he was supposed to pay the government would be waived not only for him but also for his successors for up to 5 generations. During this period, the technology of qanat was in its heyday and it even spread to other countries. For example, following Darius's order, Silaks the naval commander of the Persian army and Khenombiz the royal architect managed to construct a qanat in the oasis of Kharagha in Egypt. Beadnell believes that qanat construction dates back to two distinct periods: they were first constructed by the Persians, and later the Romans dug some other qanats during their reign in Egypt from 30 BC to 395 AD. The magnificent temple built in this area during Darius's reign shows that there was a considerable population depending on the water of qanats. Ragerz has estimated this population to be 10,000 people. The most reliable document confirming the existence of qanats at this time was written by Polybius who states that: “the streams are running down from everywhere at the base of Alborz mountain, and people have transferred too much water from a long distance through some subterranean canals by spending much cost and labor”.

During the Seleucid Era, which began after the occupation of Iran by Alexander, it seems that the qanats were abandoned.

In terms of the situation of qanats during this era, some historical records have been found. In a study by Russian orientalist scholars it has been mentioned that: the Persians used the side branches of rivers, mountain springs, wells and qanats to supply water. The subterranean galleries excavated to obtain groundwater were named as qanat. These galleries were linked to the surface through some vertical shafts which were sunk in order to get access to the gallery to repair it if necessary.

According to the historical records, the Parthian kings did not care about the qanats the way the Achaemenid kings and even Sassanid kings did. As an instance, Arsac III, one of the Parthian kings, destroyed some qanats in order to make it difficult for Seleucid Antiochus to advance further while fighting him. The historical records from this time indicate a perfect regulation on both water distribution and farmlands. All the water rights were recorded in a special document which was referred to in case of any transaction. The lists of farmlands – whether private or governmental – were kept at the tax department. During this period there were some official rulings on qanats, streams, construction of dam, operation and maintenance of qanats, etc. The government proceeded to repair or dredge the qanats that were abandoned or destroyed for any reason, and construct the new qanats if necessary. A document written in the Pahlavi language pointed out the important role of qanats in developing the cities at that time. In Iran, the advent of Islam, which coincided with the overthrow of the Sassanid dynasty, brought about a profound change in religious, political, social and cultural structures. But the qanats stayed intact, because the economic infrastructure, including qanats was of great importance to the Arabs. As an instance, M. Lombard reports that the Moslem clerics who lived during Abbasid period, such as Abooyoosef Ya'qoob (death 798 AD) stipulated that whoever can bring water to the idle lands in order to cultivate, his tax would be waived and he would be entitled to the lands cultivated. Therefore, this policy did not differ from that of the Achaemenids in not getting any tax from the people who revived abandoned lands. The Arabs' supportive policy on qanats was so successful that even the holy city of Mecca gained a qanat too. The Persian historian Hamdollah Mostowfi writes: “Zobeyde Khatoon (Haroon al-Rashid's wife) constructed a qanat in Mecca. After the time of Haroon al-Rashid, during the caliph Moghtader's reign this qanat fell into decay, but he rehabilitated it, and the qanat was rehabilitated again after it collapsed during the reign of two other caliphs named Ghaem and Naser. After the era of the caliphs this qanat completely fell into ruin because the desert sand filled it up, but later Amir Choopan repaired the qanat and made it flow again in Mecca.”

There are also other historical texts proving that the Abbasids were concerned about qanats. For example, according to the “Incidents of Abdollah bin Tahir's Time” written by Gardizi, in the year 830 AD a terrible earthquake struck the town of Forghaneh and reduced many homes to rubble. The inhabitants of Neyshaboor used to come to Abdollah bin Tahir in order to request him to intervene, for they fought over their qanats and found the relevant instruction or law on qanat as a solution neither in the prophet's quotations nor in the clerics' writings. So Abdollah bin Tahir managed to bring together all the clergymen from throughout Khorasan and Iraq to compile a book entitled “Alghani” (The Book of Qanat). This book collected all the rulings on qanats which could be of use to whoever wanted to judge a dispute over this issue. Gardizi added that this book was still applicable to his time, and everyone made references to this book.

One can deduce from these facts that during the above-mentioned period the number of qanats was so considerable that the authorities were prompted to put together some legal instructions concerning them. Also it shows that from the ninth to eleventh centuries the qanats that were the hub of the agricultural systems were also of interest to the government. Apart from The Book of Alghani, which is considered as a law booklet focusing on qanat-related rulings based on Islamic principles, there is another book about groundwater written by Karaji in the year 1010. This book, entitled "Extraction of Hidden Waters", examines just the technical issues associated with the qanat and tries to answer the common questions such as how to construct and repair a qanat, how to find a groundwater supply, how to do leveling, etc.. Some of the innovations described in this book were introduced for the first time in the history of hydrogeology, and some of its technical methods are still valid and can be applied in qanat construction. The content of this book implies that its writer (Karaji) did not have any idea that there was another book on qanats compiled by the clergymen.

There are some records dating back to that time, signifying their concern about the legal vicinity of qanats. For example, Mohammad bin Hasan quotes Aboo-Hanifeh that in case someone constructs a qanat in abandoned land, someone else can dig another qanat in the same land on the condition that the second qanat is 500 zera' (375 meters) away from the first one. Ms. Lambton quotes Moeen al-din Esfarzi who wrote the book Rowzat al-Jannat (the garden of paradise) that Abdollah bin Tahir (from the Tahirid dynasty) and Ismaeel Ahmed Samani (from the Samanid dynasty) had several qanats constructed in Neyshaboor. Later, in the 11th century, a writer named Nasir Khosrow acknowledged all those qanats with the following words: “Neyshaboor is located in a vast plain at a distance of 40 Farsang (~240 km) from Serakhs and 70 Farsang (~420 km) from Mary (Marv) … all the qanats of this city run underground, and it is said that an Arab who was offended by the people of Neyshaboor has complained that; what a beautiful city Neyshaboor could have become if its qanats would have flowed on the ground surface and instead its people would have been underground”. These documents all certify the importance of qanats during the Islamic history within the cultural territories of Iran.

In the 13th century, the invasion of Iran by Mongolian tribes reduced many qanats and irrigation systems to ruin, and many qanats were deserted and dried up. Later, in the era of the Ilkhanid dynasty especially at the time of Ghazan Khan and his Persian minister Rashid al-Din Fazl-Allah, some measures were taken to revive the qanats and irrigation systems. There is a 14th-century book entitled "Al-Vaghfiya Al-Rashidiya" (Rashid's Deeds of Endowment) that names all the properties located in Yazd, Shiraz, Maraghe, Tabriz, Isfahan and Mowsel that Rashid Fazl-Allah donated to the public or religious places. This book mentions many qanats running at that time and irrigating a considerable area of farmland. At the same time, another book, entitled Jame' al-Kheyrat, was written by Seyyed Rokn al-Din on the same subject as Rashid's book. In this book, Seyyed Rokn al-Din names the properties he donated in the region of Yazd. These deeds of endowment indicate that much attention was given to the qanats during the reign of Ilkhanids, but it is attributable to their Persian ministers, who influenced them.

In the Safavid era (15th and 16th centuries), the problem of the shortage of water intensified and led to the construction of many water reservoirs and qanats. Jean Chardin the French explorer who made two long journeys to Iran at this time, reports that: “the Iranians rip the foothills in search of water, and when they find any, by means of qanats they transfer this water to a distance of 50 or 60 kilometers or sometimes further downstream. No nation in the world can compete with the Iranians in recovering and transferring groundwater. They make use of groundwater in irrigating their farmlands, and they construct qanats almost everywhere and always succeed in extracting groundwater.”

The dynasty of Qajar ruled Iran from the 16th century to the early 18th century. According to Goblot, the time of Qajar can be considered as the heyday of qanats, for the qanats could flourish. Agha Mohammad Khan the founder of the Qajar dynasty chose Tehran as his capital city, a city where there was no access to a reliable stream of surface water and it had to rely on groundwater. The rich supply of groundwater and suitable geological-topographical conditions of Tehran allowed this city to house many qanats whose total discharge amounted to 2000 liters per second. Haj Mirza Aghasi (ruling between 1834 and 1848), the prime minister of the third king of the Qajar dynasty, encouraged and supported qanat construction throughout the country. Jaubert de Passa who surveyed the situation of irrigation in Iran reported a population of 50,000 in Hamedan, 200,000 in Isfahan and 130,000 in Tehran in the year 1840. Then he claims that in these cities life is indebted to the qanats which are being constructed in a simple but powerful manner. In a nutshell, the period of Qajar that lasted about 1.5 centuries witnessed considerable endeavors to revive and build new qanats.

During the Pahlavi period, the process of qanat construction and maintenance continued. A council that was responsible for the qanats was set up by the government. At that time most of the qanats belonged to landlords. In fact, feudalism was the prevailing system in the rural regions. The peasants were not entitled to the lands they worked on, but were considered only as the users of the lands. They had to pay rent for land and water to the landlords who could afford to finance all the proceedings required to maintain the qanats, for they were relatively wealthy. According to the report of Safi Asfiya, who was in charge of supervising the qanats of Iran in the former regime, in the year 1942 Iran had 40,000 qanats with a total discharge of 600,000 liters per second or 18.2 billion cubic meters per year. In 1961, another report was published revealing that in Iran there were 30,000 qanats of which just 20,000 were still in use, with a total output of 560,000 lit/se or 17.3 billion cubic meters per year. In 1959 a reform program named as the White Revolution was declared by the former Shah. One of the articles of this program addressed the land reform that let peasants take ownership of part of the landlords' lands. In fact, the land reform meant that the landlords lost their motivation for investing more money in constructing or repairing the qanats which were subject to the Land Reform Law. On the other hand, the peasants could not come up with the money to maintain the qanats, so many qanats were gradually abandoned. The introduction of modern devices, that made it possible to drill many deep wells and extract groundwater much more quickly, accelerated the qanats' destruction. The pumped wells had a negative impact on the qanats due to their overexploitation of the groundwater. These changes, that occurred in Mohammad Reza Shah's reign, inflicted great damage on the qanats of the country so that many qanats vanished forever. The statistics related to 14,778 qanats estimates the overall discharge of these qanats to be 6.2 billion cubic meters per year between the years 1972 and 1973. If we assume the total number of the qanats at that time to be 32,000, their annual discharge would have amounted to 12 billion cubic meters. In 1963, the Ministry of Water and Electricity was established in order to provide the rural and urban areas of the country with sufficient water and electricity. Later, this Ministry was renamed the Ministry of Energy. Three years later, in 1966, the parliament passed a law protecting groundwater resources. According to this law, the Ministry of Water and Electricity was allowed to ban drilling any deep or semi-deep wells wherever surveys showed that the water table was dropping because of overpumping. In fact, this law was passed only after the growing number of the pumped wells sounded the alarm about over pumping and depletion of groundwater leading to the decline in qanat' flow all over the country. This law, as well as the Law of Water Nationalization that was approved in 1968, and eventually the Law of Fair Distribution of water passed (in 1981) after the Islamic revolution emphasized the definition of restricted and free areas for drilling. In the restricted areas, drilling any wells (except for drinking and industry) was prohibited in order to prevent the continuous depletion of groundwater. So the rest of the qanats had a better chance to survive. After the Islamic revolution, a special attention was given to the qanats. For the first time in 1981 a conference on qanat was held in Mashhad during which the different options to mitigate the problem were explored. The organization of Jahad Sazandegi took responsibility for the rehabilitation of qanats, and subsidized their shareholders. Now the same organization which was renamed as “Ministry of Jihad Agriculture” is responsible for the qanats and continues to grant some funds to the stakeholders to maintain their qanats. During the last years, the parliament has allocated an annual budget of US$13 million to this ministry in order to go to the construction and maintenance of the qanats. Many other qanats may dry up without this budget, because the owners of the qanats do not afford to pay the whole expenses.

In the years 1984–1985 the ministry of energy took census of 28038 qanats whose total discharge was 9 billion cubic meters. In the years 1992–1993 the census of 28054 qanats showed a total discharge of 10 billion cubic meters. 10 years later in 2002–2003 the number of the qanats was reported as 33691 with a total discharge of 8 billion cubic meters.

In the year 2000, holding the International Conference on Qanats in Yazd drew a lot of attention to the qanats. In 2005 the Iranian government and UNESCO signed an agreement to set up the International Center on Qanats and Historic Hydraulic Structures (ICQHS) under the auspices of UNESCO. The main mission of this center is the recognition, transfer of knowledge and experiences, promotion of information and capacities with regard to all the aspects of qanat technology and related historic hydraulic structures. This mission aims to fulfill sustainable development of water resources and the application of the outcome of the activities in order to preserve historical and cultural values as well as the promotion of the public welfare within the communities whose existence depends on the rational exploitation of the resources and preservation of such historical structures. Another mission is to promote research and development to restore the qanats and other traditional historic hydraulic structures for sustainable development objectives through international co-operation and global transfer of knowledge and technology. According to a report published in 2005 by the Water Resources Base Studies Department affiliated to the Ministry of Energy, there are 15 Regional Water Authorities throughout the country, based in 30 provinces, conducting research projects on water resources in 609 study sites. Each study site is the smallest research unit, containing one or several catchments. Out of 609 study sites, 214 sites with an overall area of 991,256 square kilometers have been declared as restricted regions, and 395 sites with an area of 630648 square kilometers are considered free. In the restricted regions there are 317,225 wells, qanats and springs that discharge 36,719 million cubic meters water a year, out of which 3409 million cubic meters is surplus to the aquifer capacity. This deficit in the volume of the aquifer reserves has led to a long-term groundwater level drop of 41 centimeters a year, on average. In the free regions, the number of wells, qanats and springs amounts to 241,091 with an output of 37,527 million cubic meters a year. Therefore, in 2005, in the country as a whole, there were 130,008 deep wells with a discharge of 31,403 million cubic meter, 33,8041 semi deep wells with a discharge of 13,491 million cubic meters, 34,355 qanats with a discharge of 8,212 million cubic meters, and 55,912 natural springs with a discharge of 21,240 million cubic meters.

== Ab anbar ==
Ab Anbars have a long history in Iran, and there are still some ab anbars remaining today from the 13th century. These reservoirs would be subterranean spaces that were connected to the network of kariz in the city. A typical residential ab anbar would be located in the enclosed garden, have the capacity to hold 50 cubic meters, would be filled once every two weeks, and have its inside surfaces cleaned from sediments once a year (called layeh-rubi).

Soon public ab anbars were constructed throughout cities across Persia such as Qazvin, Yazd, Naeen, Kashan, Zavareh, Ray, Shiraz, Herat, Balkh, and others. At the beginning of the 20th century, the number of public ab anbars in Qazvin, for example, was recorded to be 151. Yet Iran still has 30,000 active Qanat systems today.

Accounts differ, but the water quality generally seemed to be satisfactory. Water temperatures of Kashan's famous Qanat of Chashmeh-i Soleiman amidst the July heat is typically around 25 degrees Celsius. Furthermore, ab anbars tend to further lower the temperature of the water due to the fascinating heat resistance properties of the construction material used. Near freezing temperatures of the water can readily be observed in the desert central city of Naeen during summer, inside an ab anbar that employs multiple windcatchers. Thus the Qanat/ab anbar system was easily able to supply the needs of many growing cities (such as medieval Qazvin) year round.

=== Location ===
Public ab anbars were often built wherever demand dictated. But factors such as accessibility of ab anbars to karizes, ease of accessibility of the public to the ab anbars, and a homogeneous density of the ab anbars in each area determined the size and location of an ab anbar.

As an example, in terms of network coverage, one could classify the karizes of Qazvin into three groups:

- Northwest karizes. The major ones were:
  - Kariz of Khomar e Tashi (a famous vizier).
  - Kariz of Akhund
  - Kariz of Shah
- North Karizes. The major ones being:
  - Kariz of Halal Abad
  - Kariz of Asghar Khani
  - Kariz of Teifuri
  - Kariz of Khiyaban
- Northeast karizes. The major ones being:
  - Kariz of Hatambeig Khatuni
  - Kariz of Mirza Rasuli
  - Kariz of Agha Jalali
  - Kariz of Sheikh Ahmadi

Each of these karizes covered a specific neighborhood and often further branched into sub-karizes as they went along serving private and public ab anbars.

Yet most ab anbars ended up being located in proximity or adjacent to commercial, religious, or other public places of interest. Many ab anbars would be located at busy intersections. Unfortunately the urban fabric of many cities in early 20th century Iran has changed dramatically over the years. Hence the ab anbars today seem to be situated out of place.

=== Preservation ===
In Qazvin, which was once dubbed as the city of ab anbars, today less than 10 ab anbars remain intact from the destructive forces of hasty modern urban development. Of the other 100 or so ab anbars that used to be scattered throughout Qazvin, only parts (such as the steps, the entrance, or the storage) remain. Most have been destroyed by housing projects and private developers. In Qazvin, none are functional anymore. However ab anbars continue to be used in some areas in rural Yazd and urban Naeen. Qanats are mostly used in rural areas and/or for agriculture.

Fully intact surviving ab anbars of Qazvin in order of capacity

Ab anbar name	Dimensions (m)	Capacity (m^{3})
Sardar-e Bozorg	17 × 17 × 17	4900
Jame' Mosque	37.5 × 10 × 10	3750
Nabi Mosque	36 × 10 × 10	3600
Sardar-e Kuchak	20 × 19 × 5.5	2090
Haj Kazem	26 × 7.5 × 10	1950
Hakim	18 × 18 × 6	1944
Agha	11.5 × 10.25 × 5.5	648
Razavi Caravanserai	14.5 × 6.5 × 5	471
Zobideh Khatun	11.5 × 2.65 × 6.5	198

Explosive migratory trends in Iran in the past 30 years have led to a wave of hasty urbanization inside the old quarters of ancient cities, destroying their original fabric. Some fare better than others though. Thus for example when comparing Qazvin to Yazd, Qazvin has fewer surviving ab anbars despite the fact that Yazd's ab anbars have been retired for much longer time spans.

== Other Persian water and irrigation systems ==
- Howz, water tank
- Terenah, irrigation system
- Yakhchal, ice tower for water conservation

== See also ==
- History of water supply and sanitation
  - Water supply and sanitation in the Indus-Saraswati Valley Civilisation
  - Ancient water conservation techniques
  - Sanitation in ancient Rome
- List of famous ab anbars of Qazvin
