= Sardar-e Kuchak Ab Anbar =

Water reservoir in Qazvin, Iran

Coordinates: 36°15′54″N 49°59′29″E

- آب‌انبار سردار کوچک
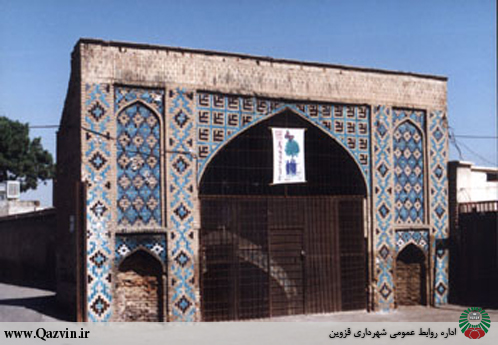

General information
- Location: Qazvin, Iran

Sardar-e Kuchak Ab Anbar (Persian: آب‌انبار سردار کوچک) is an Ab Anbar (water reservoir) in Qazvin, Iran. Built in 1814, it is one of the two Ab Anbars that were built by two brothers named Mohammad Hassan Khan and Mohammad Hossein Khan, the other being Sardar-e Bozorg Ab Anbar.

It is listed among the national heritage sites of Iran with the number 932.
