= Sardar-e Bozorg Ab Anbar =

Historic reservoir in Qazvin, Iran

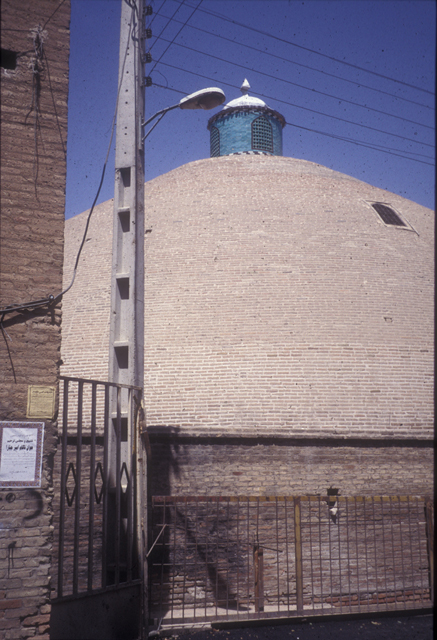
- Interactive map of Sardar-e Bozorg Ab Anbar
- Location: Qazvin, Iran

History
- Built: 1812

Sardar-e Bozorg Ab Anbar (Persian: آب‌انبار سردار بزرگ) is an Ab Anbar in Qazvin, Iran. It is the largest single-domed Ab Anbar (water reservoir) in Iran.

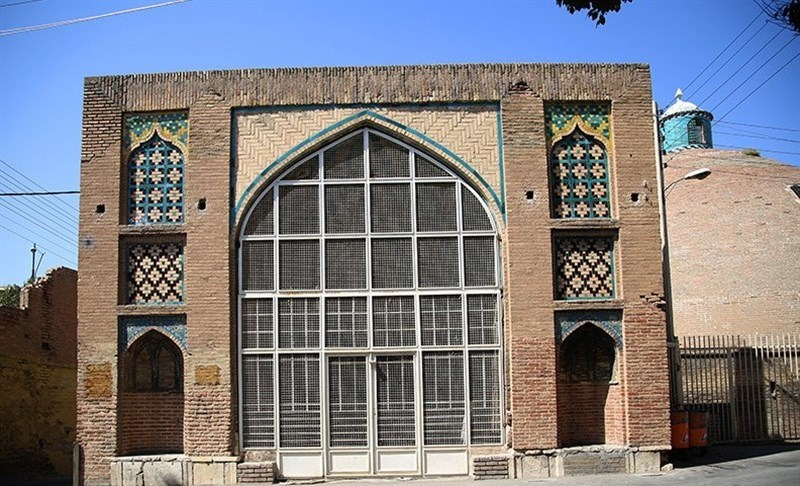
Entrance

Built in 1812, It is one of the two Ab Anbars built by two brothers named Mohammad Hassan Khan and Mohammad Hossein Khan, the other being Sardar-e Kuchak Ab Anbar. Its 3000 square meter reservoir used to get its water from a Qanat.

== Gallery ==
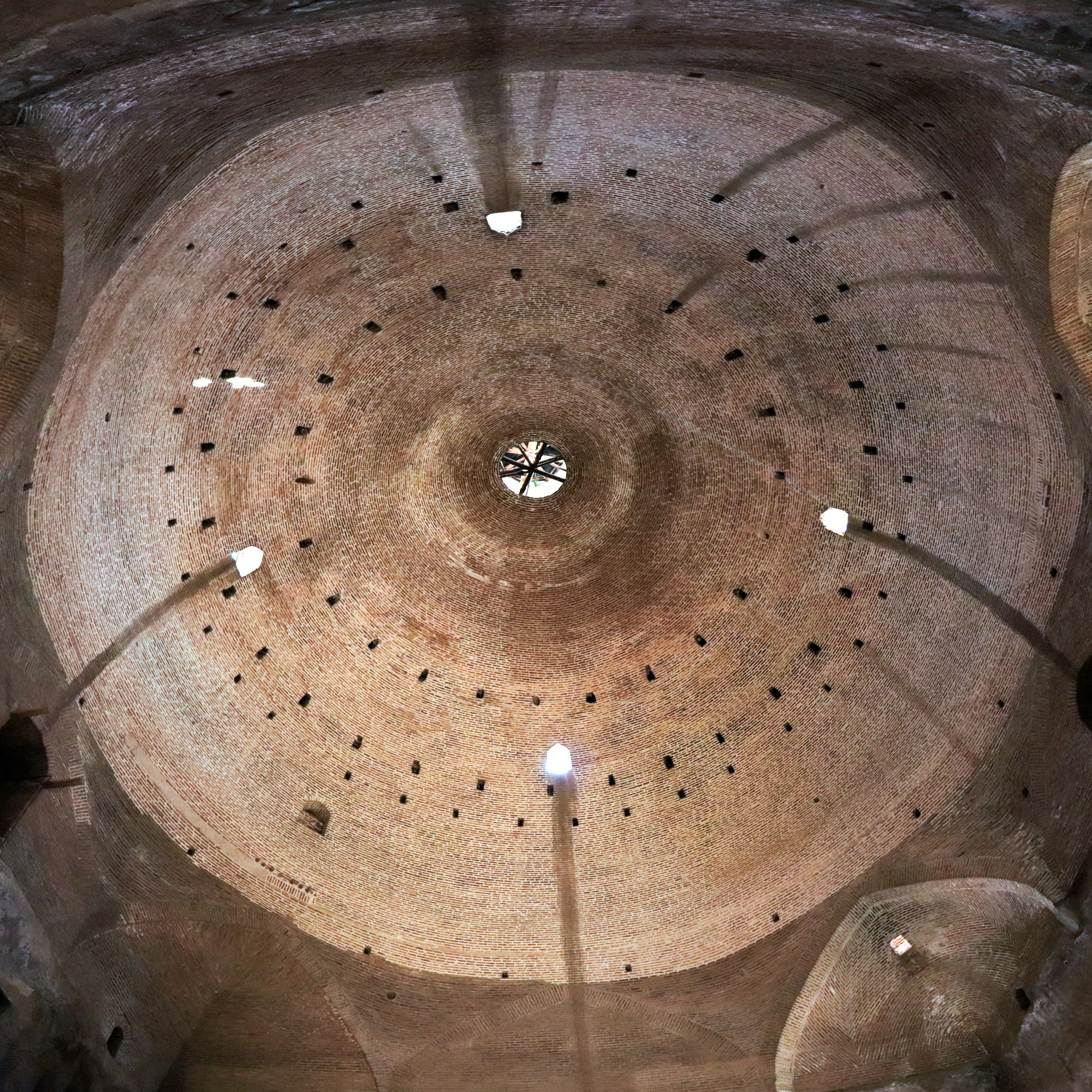

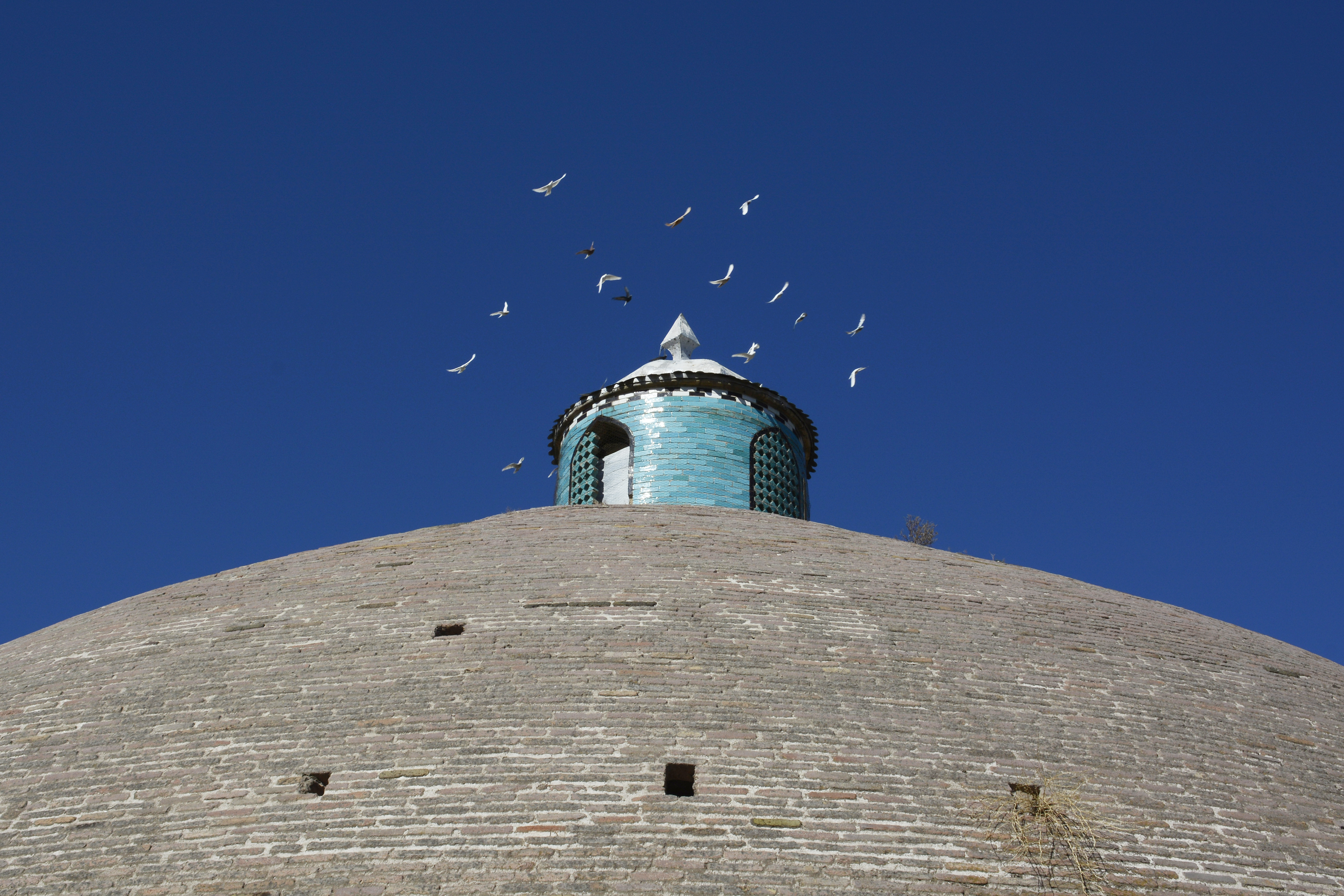

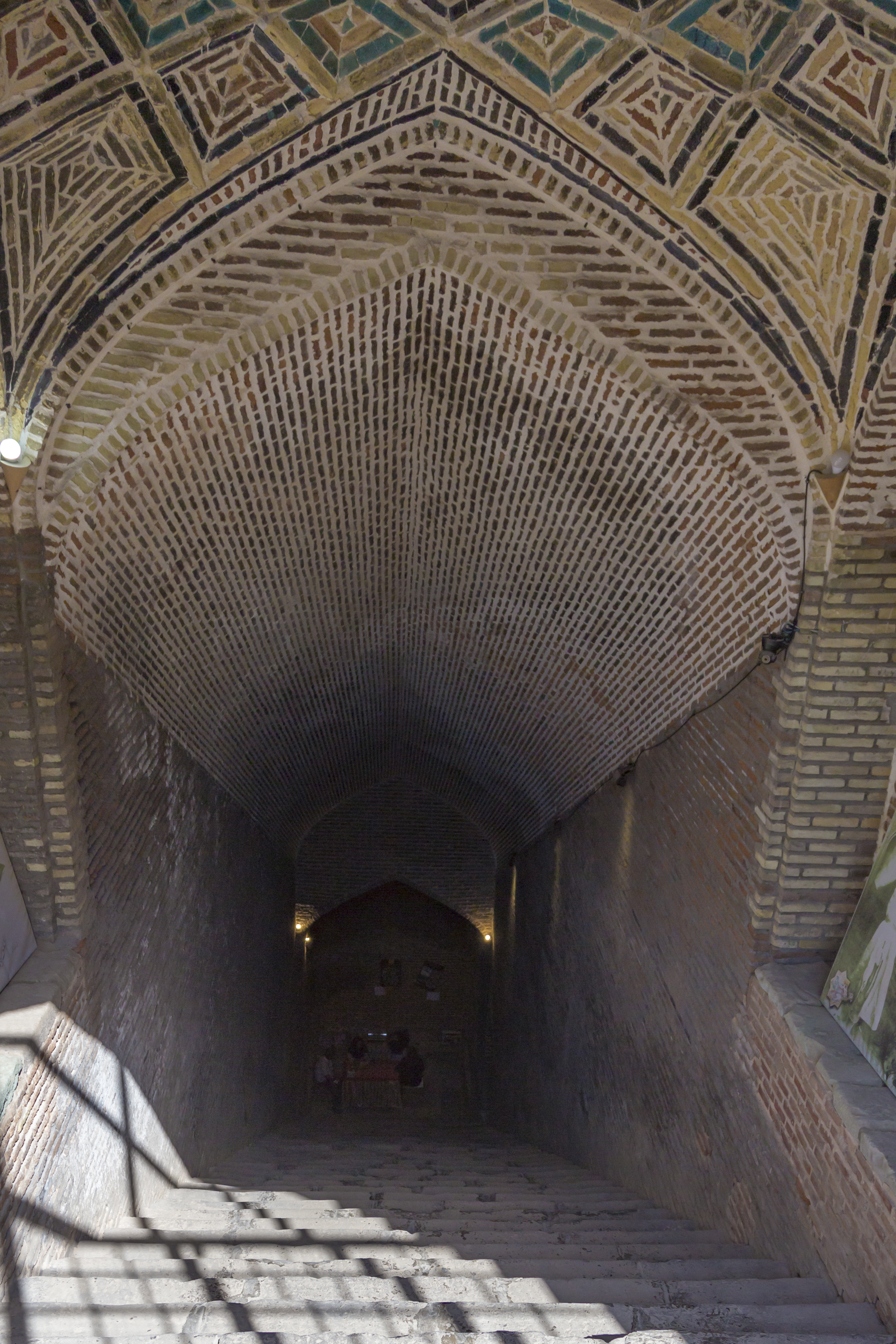
