= Haj Kazem Ab Anbar =

National heritage site in Qazvin, Iran

Coordinates: 36.2612869°N 49.989689°E

- آب انبار حاج کاظم
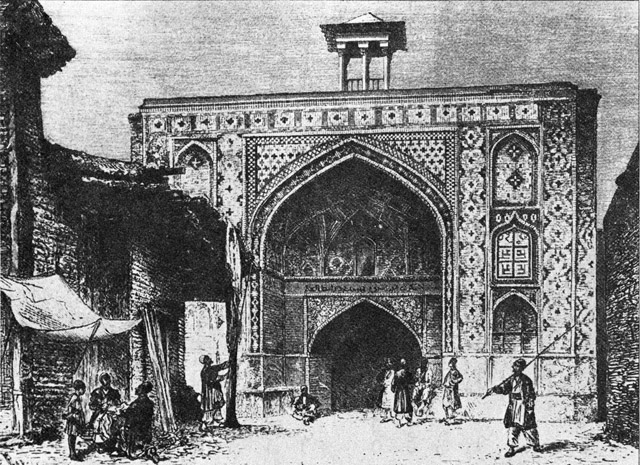
- 19th century sketch by Jane Dieulafoy

General information
- Type: Ab anbar
- Location: Qazvin, Iran

Haj Kazem Ab Anbar (Persian: آب انبار حاج کاظم) is an Ab Anbar in Qazvin, Iran. It was built in 1840–1841 by Haj Kazem Kuzegar. There are two eight metre high windcatchers attached to it that used to cool down the water in the reservoir.

It is listed in the list of Iranian national heritage sites with the number 933.

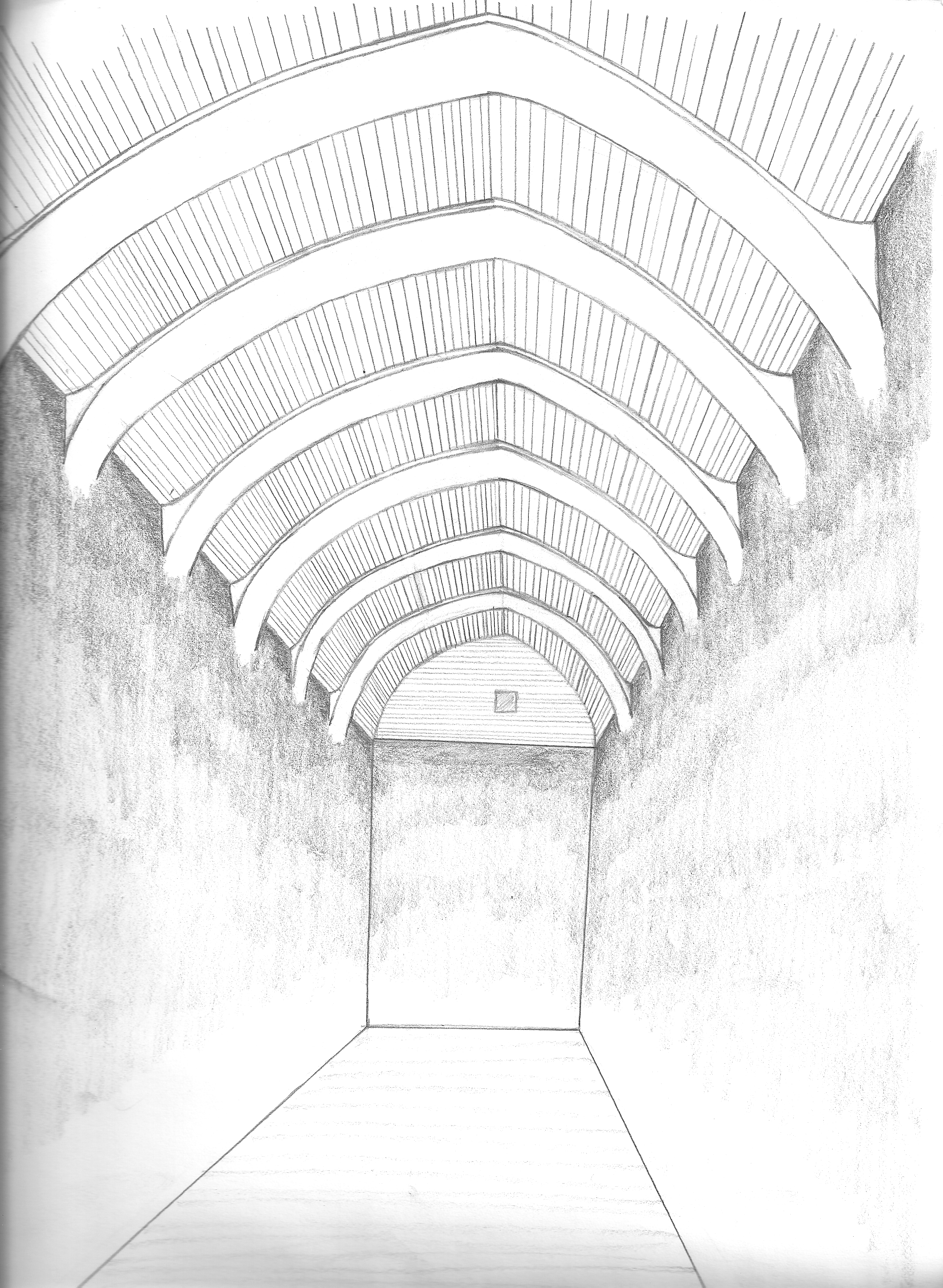
A sketch of Haj Kazem Ab Anbar's interior, 2005
